= Antanaclasis =

Type of pun

In rhetoric, antanaclasis (/æntəˈnækləsɪs, ˌæntænəˈklæsɪs/; from the Greek: ἀντανάκλασις, antanáklasis, meaning "reflection", from ἀντί anti, "against", ἀνά ana, "up" and κλάσις klásis "breaking") is the literary trope in which a single word or phrase is repeated, but in two different senses. Antanaclasis is a common type of pun, and like other kinds of pun, it is often found in slogans.

== Examples ==
- I'm not a businessman, I'm a business, man — Lyrics by Jay-Z from "Diamonds From Sierra Leone" by Kanye West.
- Your argument is sound, nothing but sound. — Benjamin Franklin. The first use of sound would generally be interpreted as "solid" or "reasonable". But the second use shows it means "noise".
- Although we're apart, you're a part of me still. — Lyrics from "Blueberry Hill" by Fats Domino.
- I used to be so careless, as if I couldn't care less. — Lyrics from "Mary's Prayer" by Danny Wilson.
- Time isn't wasted, when you're getting wasted. — Lyrics from "I Love College" by Asher Roth.
- Real sugar, sweet as a sweet can be — Lyrics from "Real Sugar" by Roxette.
- And meet me in the john, John, meet me in the john, John. — Lyrics from "My Bag" by Lloyd Cole and the Commotions.
- She's got a way, and she got, she got away. – Lyrics from "The Subway" by Chappell Roan.
- “In Genua, someone set out to make dreams come true... Remember some of your dreams?” – Sir Terry Pratchett. The first usage of dreams refers to aspirations or desires, while the second refers to literal dreams.
- "When the going gets tough, you don't want a criminal lawyer, alright? You want a criminal lawyer." – Jesse Pinkman, describing Saul Goodman.
- In Genesis 40:13 and 40:19, Joseph interprets two dreams and uses the same expression "lift up your head" to deliver two messages to two prisoners: that one will be pardoned and the other executed.
- The word that is repeated five times in the sentence That that is is that that is not is not is that it it is, which has various meanings, depending on how it is punctuated.
- Had is repeated eleven times in the sentence James while John had had had had had had had had had had had a better effect on the teacher, which can be read differently depending on punctuation and intonation.
- Buffalo is repeated eight times, and has three different meanings (a city, an animal, and a verb), in "Buffalo buffalo Buffalo buffalo buffalo buffalo Buffalo buffalo".
- The Chinese poem "Shī-shì shí shī shǐ" ("Lion-Eating Poet in the Stone Den") by Yuen Ren Chao. The words are written differently in the original language (Classical Chinese), and are pronounced as the same syllable (some with different tones) when read aloud in modern Standard Mandarin.
- Chev's brakes are snarling as you stumble across the road but the day breaks instead, so you hurry home - Lyrics from "Rock n' Roll Suicide" by David Bowie

=== Shakespeare ===
- Put out the light, then put out the light. — From Othello. Othello utters these words to himself as he enters Desdemona's chamber while she sleeps, intending to murder her. The first instance of put the light out means he will quench the candle, and the second instance means he will end the life of Desdemona.
- I will dissemble myself in't; and I would I were the first that ever dissembled in such a gown. — In Twelfth Night, the fool Feste, where dissemble changes from "disguise" to "act hypocritically".
- Whoever hath her wish, thou hast thy Will
  And Will to boot, and Will in overplus... — Shakespeare's Sonnet 135. The speaker is named Will, but the woman he is addressing has another lover who is also named Will. In this sonnet, the word will is used thirteen times, meaning "William", "sexual desire", "penis", or "vagina", depending on the context (and it usually means more than one of these things at once).
- Shall this his mock mock out of their dear husbands, Mock mothers from their sons, mock castles down — from Henry V, King Henry utters four times the word mock to express two different meanings of 'mock' - one is 'to cheat' another is 'to taunt'.

=== Witticisms ===
- "Time flies like an arrow; fruit flies like a banana" is an example of a garden path sentence – the first half of the sentence misleads the reader into parsing the second half incorrectly. The exact origin of the phrase is unknown, but differing versions of it have appeared in print since the 1960s.
- Benjamin Franklin, at the signing of the Declaration of Independence, is reported to have said: "We must, indeed, all hang together, or assuredly we shall all hang separately". However, the phrase has also been attributed to Richard Penn in Alexander Graydon's Memoirs of a Life, and appeared in Frederic Reynolds' play Life, first published in 1801.
- In an essay entitled "The Literati of New York City", Edgar Allan Poe wrote of George B. Cheever: "He is much better known, however, as the editor of The Commonplace Book of American Poetry, a work which has at least the merit of not belying its title, and is exceedingly commonplace".
- The American football coach Vince Lombardi once told his team: "If you aren't fired with enthusiasm, you will be fired, with enthusiasm".

=== Advertising ===
- The long cigarette that's long on flavor. — Pall Mall cigarettes
- We make the traveler's lot a lot easier. — Overseas National Airways

=== Responding to questions ===
Antanaclases are prevalent in humorous paraprosdokians employed when responding to a question. For example, in response to the question "how are you two?", an Israeli (Modern Hebrew) speaker can say בסדר גמור; היא בסדר, אני גמור be-séder gamúr; hí be-séder, aní gamúr, literally "in-order complete; she in-order, I complete", i.e. "We are very good. She is good, I am finished". Note the ambiguity of the Israeli lexical item גמור gamúr: it means both "complete" and "finished". A parallel punning paraprosdokian in English is a man's response to a friend's question Why are you and your wife here?: A workshop; I am working, she is shopping.

=== Latin literature ===
- The Roman poet Lucretius in De rerum natura Book 3 line 365 observes that we sometimes find ourselves temporarily blinded by bright objects because "lumina luminibus quia nobis praepediuntur" (because our eyes are impeded by the lights), taking advantage of the fact that in Latin the same word can mean both "eye" and "light".

== See also ==
- Equivocation, used as a logical fallacy
- Figure of speech
- List of linguistic example sentences
- Ploce
- Polyptoton
- Pun
- Rhetoric
- Zeugma

== Sources ==
- Baldrick, Chris. 2008. Oxford Dictionary of Literary Terms. Oxford University Press. New York. ISBN 978-0-19-920827-2
- Corbett, Edward P. J. and Connors, Robert J. 1999. Style and Statement. Oxford University Press. New York, Oxford. ISBN 0-19-511543-0
- Forsyth, Mark. 2014. The Elements of Eloquence. Berkley Publishing Group/Penguin Publishing. New York. ISBN 978-0-425-27618-1
- Kennedy, X.J. et al. 2006. The Longman Dictionary of Literary Terms: Vocabulary for the Informed Reader. Pearson, Longman. New York. ISBN 0-321-33194-X
