= Lion-Eating Poet in the Stone Den =

Chinese one-syllable poem

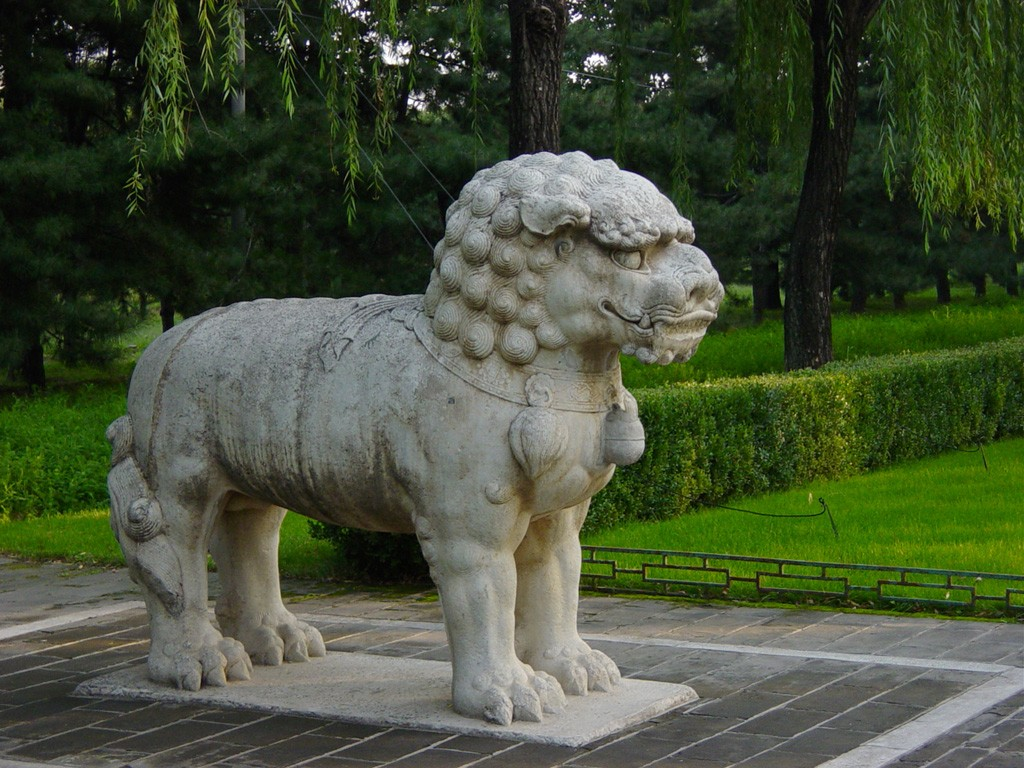
- A stone lion at the Ming tombs
- Traditional Chinese: 施氏食獅史
- Simplified Chinese: 施氏食狮史
- Literal meaning: The Story of Mr. Shi Eating Lions
- Hanyu Pinyin: Shīshì shí shī shǐ
- Bopomofo: ㄕ ㄕˋ ㄕˊ ㄕ ㄕˇ
- Gwoyeu Romatzyh: Shy-shyh shyr shy shyy
- Wade–Giles: Shih^{1}-shih^{4} shih^{2} shih^{1} shih^{3}
- Tongyong Pinyin: Shih-shìh shíh shih shǐh
- IPA: [ʂɻ̩́ ʂɻ̩̂ ʂɻ̩̌ ʂɻ̩́ ʂɻ̩̀]
- Yale Romanization: Sī-sih sihk sī sí
- Jyutping: Si1-si6 sik6 si1 si2
- IPA: [si˥ si˨ sɪk̚˨ si˥ si˧˥]
- Hokkien POJ: Si-sī si̍t sai sú

"Lion-Eating Poet in the Stone Den" (traditional Chinese: 施氏食獅史; simplified Chinese: 施氏食狮史; lit. 'The Story of Mr. Shi Eating Lions') is a short narrative poem written in Literary Chinese, with two versions composed of 92 and 94 Chinese characters respectively, which are all pronounced shi ([ʂɻ̩]) when read in Standard Mandarin, with only the tones differing.

The poem was originally written by Hu Mingfu (胡明复) and published by linguist Yuen Ren Chao in Volume 11 of The Chinese Students's Monthly in 1916. The poem was then refined by Yuen Ren Chao in the 1930s for demonstrative purposes in his lectures, and he later used it to argue the limits of the Romanization of Chinese. The poem is coherent and grammatical in Literary Chinese, but due to the number of Chinese homophones, it becomes difficult to understand in oral speech. In Mandarin, the poem is incomprehensible when read aloud, since only four syllables cover all the words of the poem. The poem is somewhat more comprehensible when read in other varieties such as Cantonese, in which it has 18 different syllables accounting for tone differences, or Hokkien, in which it has 15 different syllables.

== Background ==
Lion-Eating Poet in the Stone Den is an example of a one-syllable article, a form of constrained writing possible in tonal languages such as Mandarin Chinese, where tonal contours expand the range of meaning for a single syllable.

The poem was among three that Yuen Ren Chao would share in Language Problems (simplified Chinese: 语言问题; traditional Chinese: 語言問題; pinyin: Yǔyán Wèntí, 1968), the others being Aunt Yi (漪姨 Yī yí) and Record of the Hungry Chickens Perching on the Machine (simplified Chinese: 饥鸡集矶记; traditional Chinese: 飢雞集機記; pinyin: Jī jī jí jī jì). Yuen Ren Chao went on to produce "Ji Ji hit the Chicken" (季姬击鸡记; jì jī jī jī jì) in "Chinese culture in a Comparative perspective" (比较视野中的中国文化) the same year, which uses only the syllable /t͡ɕi/. The written poem is easy to understand for those familiar with Chinese characters, each of which is associated with a distinct core meaning. It remains intelligible in its spoken form in varieties of Chinese other than Mandarin. However, in its romanized form or when spoken in Mandarin, it becomes confusing.

Within Language Problems, Chao used the poems to clarify his argument about how the romanization of Chinese should proceed, after being misconstrued in a short interview. Specifically, he argued that romanizing Literary Chinese could not work, given the extremely different grammar and phonology the liturgical language represents; phonetically, it represents Old Chinese, and grammatically, it mimics Classical Chinese, from the days of Confucius. Therefore, whilst modern Mandarin Chinese's disyllabic structure makes it understandable when phoneticized, represented by the cyrillicized Dungan language, the Han script is still necessary to represent fields such as Chinese history, philology, and linguistics. This point is perfectly encapsulated by Literary Chinese, which, as this poem demonstrated, cannot be represented by Hanyu Pinyin or the aforementioned Dungan Cyrillic. However, as a proponent of Gwoyeu Romatzyh and General Chinese, Chao was not arguing against the phoneticization of Mandarin Chinese but merely showcasing its limits.

== Excerpt ==
The following is Hu Mingfu's 1916 draft, which was not perfectly homophonic, relying on an alternate reading for 似 sì and the character 設 shè to work:

石室詩士史氏，嗜豕，失仕，誓食十獅。獅似嗜虱。史氏設寺，恃師勢，使施氏拾獅屍，俟食時，始識世事。史使侍逝適市，視施氏。試釋是事。
Shíshì shī shì shǐ shì, shì shǐ, shī shì, shì shí shí shī. Shī sì shì shī. Shǐ shì shè sì, shì shī shì, shǐ shī shì shí shī shī, shì shí shí, shǐ shí shìshì. Shǐ shǐ shì shì shì shì, shì shī shì. Shì shì shì shì.

This translates to:

Living in a stone den is a poet-scholar named Shi, addicted to pork. Having lost his official post, he vowed to eat 10 lions. The lions seemed inclined to interfere. Mr. Shi set up an office, and used his master's influence to dispatch a messenger named Shi to fetch lion corpses, awaiting his time to eat. Only upon eating did he begin to understand the ways of the world. Mr. Shi sent his envoy to the market to observe another man named Shi. Try to explain this matter.

The following is the first six characters of Chao's refined text in various romanization systems, including Gwoyeu Romatzyh and General Chinese, Chao's own romanization systems, as well as Chinese traditional/simplified characters.

- Hanyu Pinyin: Shíshì shīshì Shī Shì
- Bopomofo: ㄕˊ ㄕˋ ㄕ ㄕˋ ㄕ ㄕˋ
- Wade-Giles: shih^{2} shih^{4} shih^{1} shih^{4} Shih^{1} Shih^{4}
- Gwoyeu Romatzyh: Shyrshyh shyshyh Shy Shyh
- Romanized General Chinese: Zhiecshit shizrii Shi Zhii
- Traditional Chinese: 石室詩士施氏
- Simplified Chinese: 石室诗士施氏
- Translation: In a stone den was a poet with the family name Shi...

== Explanation ==
The Chinese languages are tonal, meaning that changes in pitch can change the meaning of words. When written using a romanized script, the poem is an example of Chinese antanaclasis. The poem shows the flexibility of the Chinese language in many ways, including wording, syntax, punctuation, and sentence structures, which gives rise to various explanations.

The poem can be interpreted as an objection to the romanization of Literary Chinese, demonstrating the author's critique of proposals to replace Chinese characters with Latin letters – a move that could potentially lead to the marginalization or elimination of traditional Chinese script. The 20th-century linguist Yuen Ren Chao utilized this poem to illustrate the complexities and unique attributes of the Chinese language, arguing that simplification and romanization would undermine its rich tonal and logographic system.

=== Evolution ===
As Old Chinese evolved into Middle Chinese and later Mandarin Chinese, it lost numerous affixes, final plosive syllables, and underwent tonogenesis, causing it to become a radically different language to what it was before. The loss of these older sound combinations in Chinese over the centuries has greatly increased the number of Chinese homophones; to compensate, classifiers and disyllabic words emerged. Many words in Lion-Eating Poet in the Stone Den had distinct sounds in Old Chinese, but over time, especially during the Middle Chinese period, varieties of Chinese emerged that had merged and split different sounds, themselves becoming mutually unintelligible.

Illustrating the divergence of these varieties, when the same passage is read in Cantonese there are seven distinct syllables—ci, sai, sap, sat, sek, si, ik—in six distinct tone contours, producing 22 distinct character pronunciations. In Southern Min, there are six distinct syllables—se, si, su, sek, sip, sit—in seven distinct tone contours, producing fifteen character pronunciations. Therefore, the passage is barely comprehensible when read aloud in modern Mandarin without context, but easier to understand when read in other Sinitic languages, such as Cantonese.

The first line of the poem in reconstructed Old and Middle Chinese:

- Old Chinese (Behr, 2015): dak s-tit s-tə m-s-rəʔ l̥aj k.deʔ gij-s srij...
- Middle Chinese (Kroll, 2017): dzyek syit syi dzriX sye dzyijH srij...

The same excerpt read in modern varieties of Chinese:

- Cantonese (Jyutping): Sek6 sat1 si1 si6 si1 si6...
- Hokkien (Pe̍h-ōe-jī): Se̍k-sek si-sū Si--sī...
- Teochew (Peng'im): zioh^{8}sig^{4} si^{1}se^{6} si^{1}si^{6}...
- Meixian Hakka (Guangdong Romanization): sak^{8} sit^{7} si^{1} si^{5} si^{1} si^{5}...

If the excerpt from is translated into modern Mandarin and spoken, it becomes fully comprehensible:

- Traditional characters: 有一位住在石室裡的詩人叫施氏
- Simplified characters: 有一位住在石室里的诗人叫施氏
- Pinyin: Yǒu yíwèi zhù zài shíshì lǐ de shīrén jiào Shīshì
- Bopomofo: ㄧㄡˇ ㄧ ㄨㄟˋ ㄓㄨˋ ㄗㄞˋ ㄕˊ ㄕˋ ㄌㄧˇ ㄉㄜ˙ ㄕ ㄖㄣˊ ㄐㄧㄠˋ ㄕ ㄕˋ

== Reactions and commentary ==
Lion-Eating Poet in the Stone Den has been widely circulated online for decades on both the western and Chinese internet. A reading was presented by Quan Hu on BBC News in 2016.

Lydia H. Liu of Columbia University used the text as an example when analysing A Book from the Sky (simplified Chinese: 天书; traditional Chinese: 天書; pinyin: Tiānshū), a form of nonsense, asemic writing, using largely illegitimate but possible Han characters. In her comparison, she notes the power the text has to express meaning in spite of its verbal incomprehensibility thanks to the characters, while A Book from the Sky captures the fascination of Chinese readers in spite of its incomprehensible characters. She goes on to use this to make a case for nonsense writing possibly being a mathematical rather than linguistic phenomenon; Lion-Eating Poet in the Stone Den is not nonsense because its meaning can be expressed through characters that are readable, while A Book from the Sky is nonsense because it has unreadable characters. Despite this, it is not immediately noticeable as nonsense as the Han characters within are technically possible within the writing system.

== See also ==
- A Book from the Sky – Book of meaningless glyphs by artist Xu Bing
- Buffalo buffalo Buffalo buffalo buffalo buffalo Buffalo buffalo – Sentence composed of homonyms
- Homophonic puns in Standard Chinese
- James while John had had had had had had had had had had had a better effect on the teacher – Grammatically correct sentence demonstrating lexical ambiguity
- List of linguistic example sentences
- Neko no ko koneko, shishi no ko kojishi
- "The Chaos" – 1920 poem written by Gerard Nolst Trenité
