= One-syllable article =

Type of constrained writing found in Chinese literature

A one-syllable article (Chinese: 同音文章; pinyin: Tóngyīn wénzhāng) is a type of constrained writing found in Chinese literature. It takes advantage of the large number of homophones in the Chinese language, particularly when writing in Literary Chinese due to historic sound changes. While the characters used in a one-syllable article have many different meanings, they are all pronounced as the same syllable, although not with the same tone. Therefore, a one-syllable article is comprehensible in writing but becomes an incomprehensible tongue twister when read aloud, especially in Mandarin Chinese pronunciation. In other regional dialect pronunciations, not all syllables may sound alike.

== Background ==
The earliest known one-syllable article was a draft of Lion-Eating Poet in the Stone Den published in Volume 11 of The Chinese Student's Monthly by Yuen Ren Chao, who credited mathematician and contemporary Hu Mingfu 胡明复 with its creation. It was not a "true" one-syllable article in that some characters were not homophonic, leading Chao to modify the poem over time, leading to its canonical form where every syllable uses "shi" (as in Pinyin). The form has been compared to Oulipian potential literature, being compared to Alphabetical Africa by Walter Abish and A Little Illustrated ABC by George Perec, but is distinguished by the Han script bypassing the need for phonetic priming to achieve successful meaning.

One-syllable articles were popularised in Yuen Ren Chao's book Language Problems (simplified Chinese: 语言问题; traditional Chinese: 語言問題; pinyin: Yǔyán Wèntí, 1968), where he would showcase three poems: Lion-Eating Poet in the Stone Den, Aunt Yi, and Record of the Hungry Chickens Perching on the Machine. Originally having been produced earlier, they were each used to demonstrate the limits of romanizing Literary Chinese, the reason being that Literary Chinese represents Old Chinese and Classical Chinese: The former being of a completely different phonology to modern Mandarin Chinese, and the latter having a significantly different grammar and syntax. Therefore, when reading Chao's poems using modern Mandarin Chinese, they are completely incomprehensible, and, therefore, prove the point that romanization is unnecessary. Himself a proponent of Gwoyeu Romatzyh and General Chinese, he used the poems to illustrate the limits of his theory. Specifically, he believed that when studying Chinese philology, history, and literature, use of the Han script would be necessary. However, in fields such as agriculture, commerce, military affairs, and education, the Han script is unnecessary, and the more transparent Gwoyeu Romatzyh would be appropriate.

Depending on the chosen syllable, it is possible for One-Syllable Articles to act as literature beyond linguistic curiosity; for example, Lion-Eating Poet in the Stone Den has been taken as a metalinguistic riddle, with the "Mr. Shi" in the poem being an individual hunting words (lions) before realising they are identical. This matches the creative process, wherein a writer must examine the characters available to a given syllable and their potential literature, then produce a coherent narrative, rhymed or otherwise. Traditional Chinese poetic forms such as shi and fu have been achieved; however, achieving Tang-era tone patterns highly depends on the Chinese topolect and syllable in use.

== Use in education ==
Lion-Eating Poet in the Stone Den has been used in the teaching of Chinese as a foreign language to drill Chinese tones in learners, as well as introduce Classical Chinese as a concept. Additionally, specialised pieces have been produced to teach radical awareness to Mandarin Chinese and Classical Chinese learners via guided discovery, and as a tool for teaching translation of Literary Chinese through removing homophonic associations, forcing engagement with the language.

== Notable examples ==
- Lion-Eating Poet in the Stone Den (simplified Chinese: 施氏食狮史; traditional Chinese: 施氏食獅史; pinyin: Shī Shì shí shī shǐ), by 胡明复 Hu Mingfu (1916), modified and popularised Yuen Ren Chao
- Aunt Yi (Chinese: 漪姨; pinyin: Yī yí), by Yuen Ren Chao. Sometimes written as "Aunt Yi's Pancreatic Cure" (simplified Chinese: 易姨医胰; traditional Chinese: 易姨醫胰; pinyin: yì yí yī yí).
- Record of the Hungry Chickens Perching on the Machine (simplified Chinese: 饥鸡集矶记; traditional Chinese: 飢雞集機記; pinyin: Jī jī jí jī jì), by Yuen Ren Chao
- Xi plays with the rhinoceros (simplified Chinese: 熙戏犀; traditional Chinese: 熙戲犀; pinyin: xī xì xī) by Yuen Ren Chao
- Record of Lady Ji Hitting the Chicken (simplified Chinese: 季姬击鸡记; traditional Chinese: 季姬擊雞記; pinyin: jì jī jí jī jì) by Yuen Ren Chao.
- The nephew who treats hemorrhoids (Chinese: 侄治痔; pinyin: zhí zhì zhì), by He Yuanwai
- The legendary archer's descendant: Yi (Chinese: 羿裔熠; pinyin: yì yì yì)
- Suspecting the physician of losing gold (simplified Chinese: 遗镒疑医; traditional Chinese: 遺鎰疑醫; pinyin: yí yì yí yī)
- Yu Yu wants to fish (simplified Chinese: 于瑜欲渔; traditional Chinese: 于瑜欲漁; pinyin: yú yú yù yú)

== See also ==
- Buffalo buffalo Buffalo buffalo buffalo buffalo Buffalo buffalo
- James while John had had had had had had had had had had had a better effect on the teacher
