= List of linguistic example sentences =

The following is a partial list of linguistic example sentences illustrating various linguistic phenomena.

== Ambiguity ==
Different types of ambiguity which are possible in language.

=== Lexical ambiguity ===
Demonstrations of words which have multiple meanings dependent on context.

- Will, will Will will Will Will's will? – Will (a person), will (future tense auxiliary verb) Will (a second person) will (bequeath) [to] Will (a third person) Will's (the second person) will (a document)? (Someone asked Will 1 directly if Will 2 plans to bequeath his own will, the document, to Will 3.)
- Buffalo buffalo Buffalo buffalo buffalo buffalo Buffalo buffalo. – Bison (the plural of "buffalos" or "buffalo" is also accepted) from Buffalo, New York, whom bison from Buffalo bully, bully bison from Buffalo.
- Police police Police police police police Police police. – Police officers from Police, Poland, whom police officers from Police patrol, patrol police officers from Police.
- Rose rose to put rose roes on her rows of roses. (Robert J. Baran) – Rose [a person] rose [stood] to put rose [pink-colored] roes [fish eggs as fertilizer] on her rows of roses [flower].
- James while John had had had had had had had had had had had a better effect on the teacher – With punctuation: "James, while John had had 'had', had had 'had had'. 'Had had' had had a better effect on the teacher", or "James, while John had had 'had had', had had 'had'. 'Had had' had had a better effect on the teacher"
- That that is is that that is not is not is that it it is. – Grammatically corrected as: "That that is, is. That that is not, is not. Is that it? It is".
- Can can can can can can can can can can. – "Examples of the can-can dance that other examples of the same dance are able to outshine, or figuratively to put into the trashcan, are themselves able to outshine examples of the same dance". It could alternatively be interpreted as a question, "Is it possible for examples of the dance that have been outshone to outshine others?" or several other ways.
- Martin Gardner offered the example: "Wouldn't the sentence 'I want to put a hyphen between the words Fish and And and And and Chips in my Fish-And-Chips sign' have been clearer if quotation marks had been placed before Fish, and between Fish and and, and and and And, and And and and, and and and And, and And and and, and and and Chips, as well as after Chips?"
- The bears bear hard hard yarn yarns. (Lemony Snicket) – The bears endure tiring and unpleasant long stories about hard yarn.
- Fish fish fish fish fish. – With nesting clarified: Fish fish (fish that fish fish). Alternatively: Fish (that fish fish) fish fish.
- Foot heads arms body – Foot [name] heads [leads] arms [weapons] body [group of people].

=== Syntactic ambiguity ===
Demonstrations of ambiguity between alternative syntactic structures underlying a sentence.

- I made her duck.
- One morning I shot an elephant in my pajamas. How he got in my pajamas, I don't know.
- Time flies like an arrow; fruit flies like a banana.
- Eats shoots and leaves
- The Gostak distims the doshes

=== Syntactic ambiguity, incrementality, and local coherence ===
Demonstrations of how incremental and (at least partially) local syntactic parsing leads to infelicitous constructions and interpretations.

- Reduced relative clauses
  - The horse raced past the barn fell.
  - The coach smiled at the player tossed the frisbee (by the opposing team).
  - While the man was hunting the deer ran through the forest.

=== Scope ambiguity and anaphora resolution ===
- Every farmer who owns a donkey beats it.

=== Embedding ===
- The rat the cat the dog bit chased escaped.
- The editor authors the newspaper hired liked laughed.
- The man whom the boy whom the students recognized pointed out is a friend of mine.

=== Punctuation ===
Punctuation can be used to introduce ambiguity or misunderstandings where none needed to exist. One well known example, for comedic effect, is from A Midsummer Night's Dream by William Shakespeare (ignoring the punctuation provides the alternate reading).

Enter QUINCE for the Prologue
Prologue

If we offend, it is with our good will.
That you should think, we come not to offend,
But with good will. To show our simple skill,
That is the true beginning of our end.
Consider then we come but in despite.
We do not come as minding to content you,
Our true intent is. All for your delight
We are not here. That you should here repent you,
The actors are at hand and by their show
You shall know all that you are like to know.
—ACT V, Scene i

== Word order ==
=== Ending sentence with preposition ===
Some prescriptive grammar prohibits "preposition stranding": ending sentences with prepositions.

==== Avoidance ====
- This is the sort of English up with which I will not put. (Attributed by Gowers to Winston Churchill. There is no convincing evidence that Churchill said this, and good reason to believe that he did not.) The sentence "does not demonstrate the absurdity of using [prepositional phrase] fronting instead of stranding; it merely illustrates the ungrammaticality resulting from fronting something that is not a constituent".

==== Compound use ====
- "A father of a little boy goes upstairs after supper to read to his son, but he brings the wrong book. The boy says, 'What did you bring that book that I don't want to be read to out of up for?'"

== Neurolinguistics ==
Sentences with unexpected endings.

- She spread the bread with socks.

Comparative illusion:

- More people have been to Russia than I have.

== Combinatorial complexity ==
Demonstrations of sentences which are unlikely to have ever been said other than as an example sentence, although the combinatorial complexity of the linguistic system makes them possible.

- Colorless green ideas sleep furiously (Noam Chomsky): example that is grammatically correct but based on semantic combinations that are contradictory and therefore would not normally occur.
- Hold the news reader's nose squarely, waiter, or friendly milk will countermand my trousers.

== Semantics and context ==
Demonstrations of sentences where the semantic interpretation is bound to context or knowledge of the world.

- The large ball crashed right through the table because it was made of Styrofoam: ambiguous use of a pronoun: The word "it" refers to the table being made of Styrofoam; but "it" would immediately refer to the large ball if we replaced "Styrofoam" with "steel" without any other change in its syntactic parse.
- The bee landed on the flower because it had nectar: The pronoun "it" refers to the "flower" but changes to the "bee" if we replace "had" with "wanted".
- We bought the boys apples because they were so hungry: "they" refers to the boys, but if "hungry" is replaced with "cheap", with no grammatical change, it refers to the apples.
- St Paul’s Cathedral is amusing, awful, and artificial: The adjectives are contronyms and their main, contemporary meanings conflict with minority meanings of "amazing, awe-inspiring, and artistic."

=== Relevance conditionals ===
Conditionals where the prejacent ("if" clause) is not strictly required for the consequent to be true.

- There are biscuits on the table if you want some (biscuit conditional).
- If I may be honest, you're not looking good.

== Non-English examples ==
=== Filipino ===
- Bababa ba?
  - ("Is it going down?")
- Ba? Bababa ba?
  - ("Really? Is it going down?")
- Ba? Bababa ba? Baba!
  - ("Really? Is it going down? Get down!")
- Person 1: Ba? Bababa ba? Person 2: Bababa.
  - (Person 1: "Really? Is it going down?" Person 2: "Yes, it's going down".)

=== Ojibwe ===
- Gdaa-naanaanaa, Aanaa, naa? meaning "We should fetch Ana, shouldn't we?".

=== Latin ===
- John, Archbishop of Esztergom (Kingdom of Hungary) was pressed to make a statement on the assassination of Gertrude of Merania, and on the first hand the assassination would have been beneficial for the Church but on the other hand taking part in an assassination might have caused him to lose his position and possibly life; so he wrote in 1213: "Reginam occidere nolite timere bonum est si omnes consentiunt ego non contradico". The sentence can be read as "Reginam occidere nolite, timere bonum est, si omnes consentiunt, ego non. Contradico." ("don't kill the Queen, it is good to be afraid, even if all agree I do not. I object."), or the opposite meaning "Reginam occidere nolite timere, bonum est; si omnes consentiunt ego non contradico." ("Do not be afraid to kill the Queen, it is good, if all agree then I do not object."). It has been quoted by Boncompagno da Signa is his work Rhetorica novissima in 1235 and from there it has been part of the rhetorical education.
  - King Edward II of England was killed, reportedly after Adam of Orleton, one of his gaolers, received a message, probably from Mortimer, reading "Edwardum occidere nolite timere bonum est". This can be read either as "Edwardum occidere nolite; timere bonum est" ("Do not kill Edward; it is good to be afraid [to do so]") or as "Edwardum occidere nolite timere; bonum est" ("Do not be afraid to kill Edward; [to do so] is good"). This ambiguous sentence has been much discussed by various writers, including John Harington.
- Ibis redibis nunquam per bella peribis.

=== Mandarin Chinese ===
- Various sentences using the syllables mā, má, mǎ, mà, and ma are often used to illustrate the importance of tones to foreign learners. One example: Chinese: 妈妈骑马马慢妈妈骂马; pinyin: māma qí mǎ, mǎ màn, māma mà mǎ; lit. 'Mother is riding a horse, the horse is slow, mother scolds the horse'.
- Lion-Eating Poet in the Stone Den: poem of 92 characters, all with the sound shi (in four different tones) when read in Modern Standard Mandarin

=== Japanese ===
- Although at first glance the single character sentence 子子子子子子子子子子子子 does not seem to make sense, when this sentence is read using the right readings of the kanji 子 (in the example it only borrows the pronunciation but not the meaning of the logograms, like man'yōgana), it means "the young of cat, kitten, and the young of lion, cub". This would be "猫之子、子猫、獅子之子、子獅子" if it were to be written semantically, with the genitive construction being inferred in the original. It is told in the work Ujishūi Monogatari that the Japanese poet Ono no Takamura used this reading to escape death.

=== Czech ===
- Jedli na hoře bez holí, meaning either "they ate on a mountain without sticks" or "they ate while top naked, with a stick" or "they ate at the top, without any sticks"; depending on the phrasing or a correct placement or punctuation, at least 7 meanings can be obtained. By replacing "na hoře" by "nahoře", one obtains 5 more meanings. If separating words using spaces is also permitted, the total number of known possible meanings rises to 58.

=== Korean ===
- In Gyeongsang dialect, the repetition of the syllable 가 ("ga") with the right intonation can form meaningful phrases. For example:
  - "가가 가가?" which means "Are they the one we talked about?"
  - "가가 가가가" which means "Since they took it away"
  - "가가 가가가?" which means "Are they the one with the surname Ga?"

=== German ===
- A famous example of lexical ambiguity is the following sentence: "Wenn hinter Fliegen Fliegen fliegen, fliegen Fliegen Fliegen hinterher.", meaning "When flies fly behind flies, then flies fly in pursuit of flies." It takes advantage of some German nouns and corresponding verbs being homonymous. While not noticeable in spoken language, in written language the difference shows: "Fliegen" ("flies"), being a noun, is written with a capital "F", whereas "fliegen" ("to fly"), being a verb, is not. The comma can be left out without changing the meaning. There are several variations of this sentence pattern, although they do not work as smoothly as the original. Dutch language shares this same example, with the noticeable difference of not capitalising the initials of nouns, making it "Als achter vliegen vliegen vliegen, vliegen vliegen vliegen achterna."

=== Dutch ===
- Kees Torn expanded on the example given in the German section ("Als achter vliegen vliegen vliegen, vliegen vliegen vliegen achterna."), from which he created: "Als, in de plaats waar van de makkelijk te zeven zeven zeven zeven zeven zeven zeven, Zeven, zeven zeven zeven zeven zeven, zeven zeven zeven zeven zeven." which uses the fact that "zeven" has multiple roles: it is a number (seven), a verb (to sieve), a plural noun (sieves) and the name of a German town (Zeven). As such the translation is: "If, in the town where the easy-to-sieve sieves seven sieves sieve seven sieves, Zeven, seven sieves sieve seven sieves, seven sieves sieve seven sieves".

=== Persian ===
A famous example of lexical ambiguity in Persian is the following sentence:

بخشش لازم نیست اعدامش کنید

It can be read either as:

- بخشش! لازم نیست اعدامش کنید

which means "Forgiveness! No need to execute them"

Or as:

- بخشش لازم نیست! اعدامش کنید

which means "Forgiveness not needed! Execute them"

=== Russian ===
- The same phrase as in Persian: "Казнить нельзя помиловать" can be interpreted as "Казнить нельзя, помиловать" or as "Казнить, нельзя помиловать", which means respectively "Executing is impossible/disallowed, [you should] pardon" and "Execute her/him, pardon is impossible/disallowed".
- Косил косой-косой косой косой Косой с косой косой косой косой косой косой — "Very very drunk cockeyed hare named Kosoy with askew braid mowed with bent scythe on bevel foreland".

=== Polish ===
- Wydrze wydrzę wydrze wydrze wydrze wydrzę which means "The young otter of the otter will steal the young otter from otter"
- Dział dział dział which means "The artillery department was knitting"
- Palmy palmy Palmy which means "Let's burn the palm trees of Palma"

=== Scots ===
- Fit fit fits fit fit? which means "What shoe fits which foot?". Used as a humorous way of demonstrating the unique phonology of the Doric dialect of Scots, where what would be a /ʍ/ sound in other dialects, represented by wh, is instead expressed as /f/.

=== Finnish ===
- The phrase kuusi palaa is frequently used as an example of homonymy in Finnish. It has up to nine meanings, since each word can be individually interpreted in three ways: kuusi can be "six", "spruce" or "your moon", while palaa can be "returns", "burns" or "pieces".

=== Indonesian ===
- The sentence kuku-kuku kakiku kok kek kaku, kakak-kakakku? means "why do my toenails look a bit rigid, my sisters/brothers?". Note that kek in Indonesian is an informal form of seperti means "look like" or "kind of".
- The sentence pukul pemukul pemukul yang memukul pemukul secara pukul-pukulan dan pukul pemukul dengan pemukul pukul dua agar pemukul terpukul karena dipukul dengan pemukul means "hit the hammer beater that hit the hammer 'riotly' and hit the beater with [a] hammer at 2 o'clock so the beater feels depressed because he was beaten by hammer".

== See also ==
- Garden-path sentence, sentences that illustrate that humans process language one word at a time
- Gradient well-formedness
- Grammaticality
- Longest words
- One-syllable article, Chinese phonological ambiguity
  - Lion-Eating Poet in the Stone Den – Chinese one-syllable poem
- Paraprosdokian, a figure of speech in which the latter part of a sentence or phrase is surprising or unexpected in a way that causes the reader or listener to reframe the first part
