= Garden-path sentence =

Sentence that starts in a way that a reader's likely interpretation will be wrong

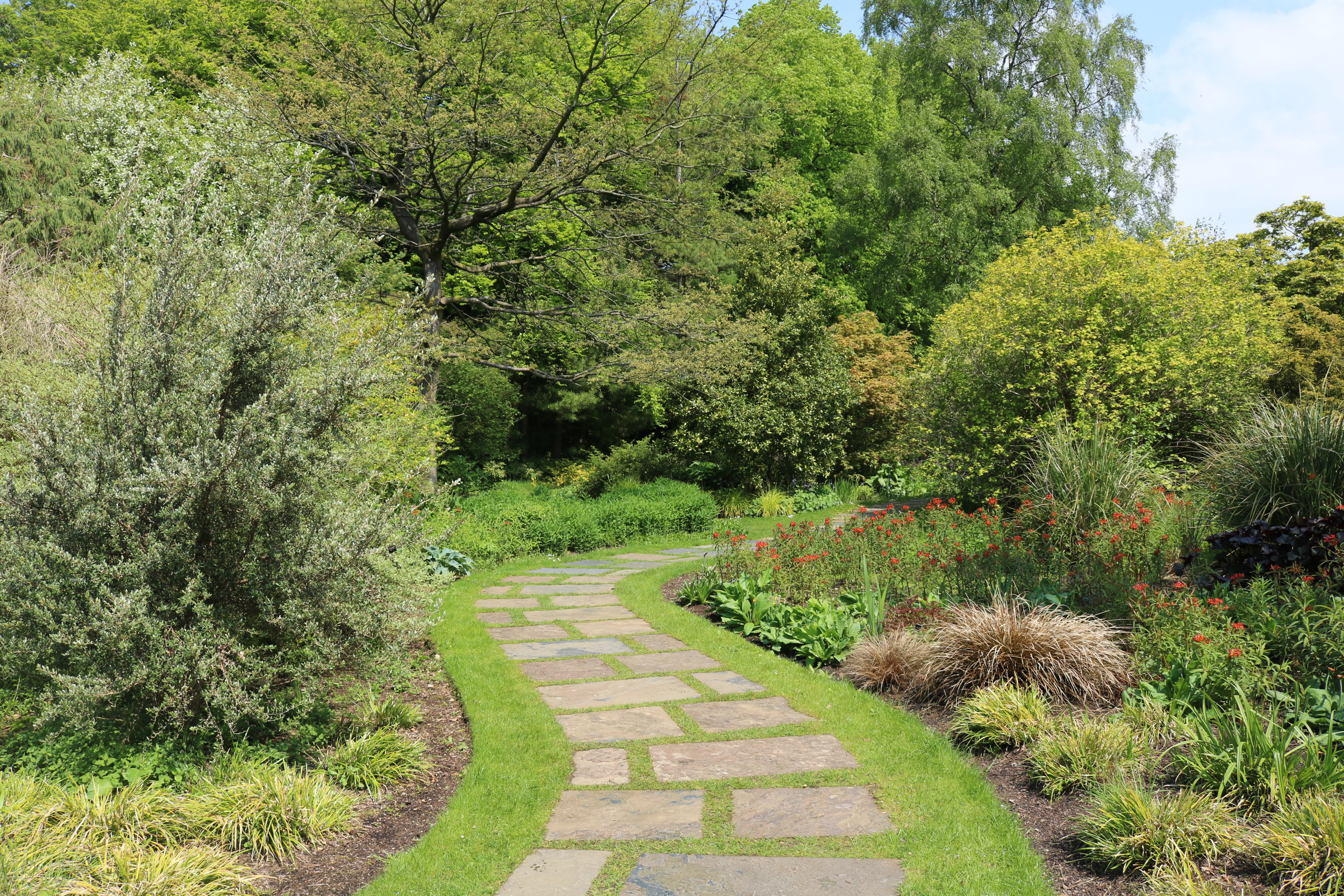
The analogy gets its name from twisting garden paths, which may take the traveler in unexpected directions

A garden-path sentence is a grammatically correct sentence that starts in such a way that a reader's most likely interpretation will be incorrect; the reader is lured into a parse that turns out to be a dead end or yields a clearly unintended meaning. Garden path refers to the saying "to be led down [or up] the garden path", meaning to be deceived, tricked, or seduced. In A Dictionary of Modern English Usage (1926), Fowler describes such sentences as unwittingly laying a "false scent".

It is a special type of sentence that creates a momentarily ambiguous interpretation because it contains a word or phrase that can be interpreted in multiple ways. When read, the sentence seems to be grammatically incorrect and nonsensical, and often requires careful parsing to understand correctly. Garden-path sentences are not usually desirable in writing that is intended to communicate clearly.

== Examples ==
=== "The old man the boat." ===
Suggesting uncompletable parse

Less obvious complete parse

This is a common example that has been the subject of psycholinguistic research and has been used to test the capabilities of artificial intelligence efforts. The difficulty in correctly parsing the sentence results from the fact that readers tend to interpret old as an adjective. Reading the, they expect a noun or an adjective to follow, and when they then read old followed by man they assume that the phrase the old man is to be interpreted as determiner – adjective – noun. When readers encounter another the following the supposed noun man (rather than the expected verb, as in e.g., The old man washed the boat), (Note: Experiments that measured readers' reaction times after each word indicated that "the reaction time following the disambiguating word [the or washed following man] is significantly greater for the garden path than for the normal sentence.") they are forced to re-analyze the sentence. As with other examples, one explanation for initial reader misunderstanding is that a sequence of words or phrases tends to be analyzed in terms of a frequent pattern, in this case, determiner – adjective – noun. Rephrased, the sentence could be rewritten as "Those who man the boat are old."

=== "The complex houses married and single soldiers and their families." ===
This is another commonly cited example. Like the previous sentence, the initial parse is to read the complex houses as a noun phrase, but the complex houses married does not make semantic sense (only people can marry) and the complex houses married and single makes no sense at all (after married and ... , the expectation is another verb to form a compound predicate). The correct parsing is The complex [noun phrase] houses [verb] married and single soldiers [noun phrase] and their families [noun phrase]. Rephrased, the sentence could be rewritten as “The complex accommodates married and single soldiers, along with their families.”

=== "The horse raced past the barn fell." ===
This frequently used, classic example of a garden-path sentence is attributed to Thomas Bever. The sentence is hard to parse because raced can be interpreted as a finite verb or as a passive participle. Readers initially interpret raced as the main verb in the simple past, but when they encounter fell, they are forced to re-analyze the sentence, concluding that raced is being used as a passive participle and horse is the direct object of the subordinate clause. The sentence could be replaced by "The horse that was raced past the barn fell", where that was raced past the barn tells the readers which horse is under discussion. Such examples of initial ambiguity resulting from a "reduced relative with [a] potentially intransitive verb" ("The horse raced past the barn fell.") can be contrasted with the lack of ambiguity for a non-reduced relative ("The horse that was raced past the barn fell.") or with a reduced relative with an unambiguously transitive verb ("The horse frightened in the barn fell."). As with other examples, one explanation for initial reader misunderstanding is that a sequence of phrases tends to be analyzed in terms of the frequent pattern: agent – action – patient.

=== In other languages ===
==== Chinese ====
"本食堂欢迎新老师生前来就餐。"

This sentence can be interpreted in two ways:

"The canteen welcomes new and old teachers and students to come and dine here."

Structurally:

[本[食堂]] [欢迎] [新老[师生]] [前来] [就餐]

[This [canteen]] [welcome] [new and old [teachers and students]] [come forward] [have meal]

This interpretation would be the most natural in a typical context. It implies that the canteen welcomes new and old teachers and students, indicating a general invitation to all.

"The canteen welcomes new teachers to come and dine here when they are alive."

Structurally:

[本[食堂]] [欢迎] [新[老师]] [生前] [来] [就餐]

[This [canteen]] [welcome] [new [teachers]] [while alive] [come] [have meal]

This interpretation might seem more awkward and unnatural in regular usage. The phrase "生前" (shēng qián) typically refers to "while alive" or "before death." While this interpretation could be grammatically correct, it introduces a somewhat bizarre and formal tone, making it sound like the canteen only welcomes teachers who are alive, which seems overly specific and strange for such a context. So, the more natural and probable meaning is the first one, where the canteen is simply extending a welcoming message to both new and old teachers and students.

==== German ====
"Modern bei dieser Bilderausstellung werden vor allem die Rahmen, denn sie sind aus Holz und im feuchten Keller gelagert worden."

This example turns on the two meanings of German modern: the adjective meaning English 'modern', and the verb meaning 'to rot'.

The theme of the "picture exhibition" in the first clause lends itself to interpreting modern as an adjective meaning 'contemporary', until the last two words of the sentence:

- 'Most of all, it is the picture frames in this exhibition that are becoming modern, because they are made out of wood, and had been stored in the dank cellar.'

This causes dissonance at the end of the sentence, and forces backtracking to recover the proper usage and sense (and different pronunciation) of the first word of the sentence, not as the adjective meaning "contemporary", but as the verb meaning "going moldy":

- 'Most of all, it is the picture frames in this exhibition that are becoming moldy, because they are made out of wood and had been stored in the dank cellar.'

The ambiguity, however, is only perceived in writing, since the two occurrences of the word modern in the sentence have different pronunciations (for 'going moldy' it is stressed on the first syllable, while for 'contemporary' on the second one).

==== Portuguese ====
"Mãe suspeita da morte do filho e foge."

This example makes use of the ambiguity between the verb suspeita and the adjective suspeita, which is also captured by the English word suspect. It also makes use of a misreading in which the word e is passed over by the parser, which lends to two different meanings.

- In a first parse, the sentence might be read as '[A] mother [who is the] suspect of son's death runs away.' In this sentence, the suspeita serves as an adjective for the mother who runs away due to the fact that e is easily overlooked.
- A second parse, however, reveals the true reading of the sentence to be '[A] mother suspects son's death and runs away.' Suspeita now serves as a verb and reveals that a mother suspects that her son might be dead.

==== French ====
"Pas de porte à vendre." (sign on an empty commercial site)

The ambiguity hinges on the word "pas" which can be a negative particle as in "Je ne sais pas" ("I don't know") or a noun meaning "step" as in "Je fais un pas en avant" ("I take a step forwards")

Thus the sign can be understood as "pas de" = no + "porte" = door + "à vendre" = for sale; thus the meaning would be "No door(s) for sale"

The second parse recognises the legal term "pas de porte" = "lease" or "leasehold" and the meaning becomes "Leasehold for sale".

== Parsing ==
When reading a sentence, readers will analyze the words and phrases they see and make inferences about the sentence's grammatical structure and meaning in a process called parsing. Generally, readers will parse the sentence chunks at a time and will try to interpret the meaning of the sentence at each interval. As readers are given more information, they make an assumption of the contents and meaning of the whole sentence. With each new portion of the sentence encountered, they will try to make that part make sense with the sentence structures that they have already interpreted and their assumption about the rest of the sentence. The garden-path sentence effect occurs when the sentence has a phrase or word with an ambiguous meaning that the reader interprets in a certain way and, when they read the whole sentence, there is a difference in what has been read and what was expected. The reader must then read and evaluate the sentence again to understand its meaning. The sentence may be parsed and interpreted in different ways due to the influence of pragmatics, semantics, or other factors describing the extralinguistic context.

=== Parsing strategies ===
Various strategies can be used when parsing a sentence, and there is much debate over which parsing strategy humans use. Differences in parsing strategies can be seen from the effects of a reader attempting to parse a part of a sentence that is ambiguous in its syntax or meaning. For this reason, garden-path sentences are often studied as a way to test which strategy humans use. Two debated parsing strategies that humans are thought to use are serial and parallel parsing.

Serial parsing is where the reader makes one interpretation of the ambiguity and continues to parse the sentence in the context of that interpretation. The reader will continue to use the initial interpretation as reference for future parsing until disambiguating information is given.

Parallel parsing is where the reader recognizes and generates multiple interpretations of the sentence and stores them until disambiguating information is given, at which point only the correct interpretation is maintained.

== Reanalysis of a garden-path sentence ==
When ambiguous nouns appear, they can function as both the object of the first item or the subject of the second item. In that case, the former use is preferred. It is also found that the reanalysis of a garden-path sentence gets more and more difficult with the length of the ambiguous phrase.

=== Recovery strategies ===
A research paper published by Meseguer, Carreiras and Clifton (2002) stated that intensive eye movements are observed when people are recovering from a mild garden-path sentence. They proposed that people use two strategies, both of which are consistent with the selective reanalysis process described by Frazier and Rayner in 1982. According to them, the readers predominantly use two alternative strategies to recover from mild garden-path sentences.

- The more common one includes the regression of eyes from the first disambiguation directly to the main verb of the sentence. Then the readers reread the remainder of the sentence, fixating their eyes on the next region and the adverb (the beginning of the ambiguous part of the sentence).
- The lesser-used strategy includes the regression from the first disambiguation directly to the adverb.

=== Partial re-analysis ===
Partial re-analysis occurs when analysis is not complete. Frequently, when people can make even a little bit of sense of the later sentence, they stop analysing further so the former part of the sentence still remains in memory and does not get discarded from it.

Therefore, the original misinterpretation of the sentence remains even after the re-analysis is done; hence participants' final interpretations are often incorrect.

=== Difficulties in revision ===
Recent research has utilized adult second-language learners, or L2 learners, to study difficulties in revision of the initial parsing of garden-path sentences. During the processing of garden-path sentences, the reader has an initial parse of the sentence, but often has to revise their parse because it is incorrect. Unlike adult native speakers, children tend to have difficulty revising their first parsing of the sentence. This difficulty is attributed to the underdeveloped executive functioning of children. Executive functioning skills are utilized when the initial parsing of a sentence needs to be discarded for a revised parsing, and underdeveloped or damaged executive functioning impairs this ability. As the child ages and their executive functioning completes development, they gain the ability to revise the initial incorrect parsing. However, difficulties in revision are not unique to children. Adult L2 learners also exhibit difficulty in revisions, but the difficulties cannot be attributed to underdeveloped executive functioning.

In a 2015 study, adult L2 learners were compared to adult native speakers and native-speaking children in revision and processing of garden-path sentences using act-out errors and eye movement. Adult native English speakers, English-speaking children, and adult English L2 learners were shown garden-path sentences or disambiguated garden-path sentences that either had reference information or no reference information and then asked to act out the sentence. Adult L2 speakers had fewer act-out errors than native-speaking children when the garden-path sentence was presented with referential information, similarly to the adult native speakers that present less act-out errors than both the adult L2 learners and native-speaking children. Adult L2 speakers and native adult speakers were able to use discourse and referential information to aid in their processing of the garden-path sentences. This ability could be due to the adults’ developed executive functioning allowing them more cognitive resources, discourse and referential information, to aid in parsing and revision. Additionally, the use of discourse and referential information could be due to L1-transfer because Italian and English share the same sentence structure. However, when the garden-path sentences are disambiguated and then presented, the adult L2 speakers had the highest act-out error rate followed by native-speaking children and then by adult native speakers. The results of this study indicate that difficulties in parsing revision are more common than originally thought and are not confined to children or individuals with reduced executive functioning. Adults, both native speakers and L2 learners, use discourse and referential information in parsing and sentence processing. But adult L2 learners and native-speaking children had similar error rates for garden-path sentences with no reference information, indicating systematic revision failure.

== See also ==
- The Garden of Forking Paths, a short story by Jorge Luis Borges

=== Similar phenomena ===
- Antanaclasis and zeugma, literary devices in which a single word or phrase is repeated, but in two different senses
- Buffalo buffalo Buffalo buffalo buffalo buffalo Buffalo buffalo and James while John had had had had had had had had had had had a better effect on the teacher, complexity and linguistic ambiguity in a grammatical sentence
- Comparative illusion, ungrammatical sentences which often are perceived to be acceptable
- Dangling else, a similarly ambiguous parsing issue in computer programming
- Dangling modifier
- Donkey sentence, a sentence that contains a pronoun whose reference is clear to the reader (it is bound semantically) but which is much more complex to technically classify
- Paraprosdokian
- Syntactic ambiguity
- Synchysis

=== Other ===
- Branch predictor
- List of linguistic example sentences
- Natural language processing
- Transderivational search
- Winograd schema challenge
