= Yuen Ren Chao =

Chinese-American linguist and educator (1892–1982)

- 趙元任
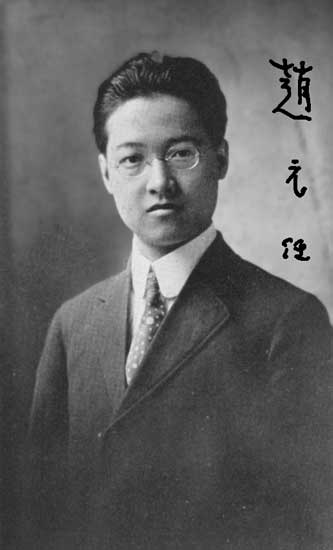
- c. 1916 portrait of Chao
- Born: 3 November 1892; Tianjin, Great Qing
- Died: 25 February 1982 (aged 89); Cambridge, Massachusetts, U.S.
- Citizenship: China (Qing 1892–1911, Republic of China 1912–1982); United States (from 1954)
- Education: Cornell University (BA); Harvard University (PhD)
- Known for: Chinese language reform
- Works: "The Problem of the Chinese Language" (1916); Gwoyeu Romatzyh (1926); "Lion-Eating Poet in the Stone Den" (1930s); Mandarin Primer (1948); A Grammar of Spoken Chinese (1968)
- Spouse: Buwei Yang Chao (m. 1921; died 1981)
- Scientific career
- Fields: Dialectology, phonology
- Workplaces: University of California, Berkeley; Harvard University; Tsinghua University
- Notable students: Jerry Norman; Anne O. Yue-Hashimoto

Chinese name
- Traditional Chinese: 趙元任
- Simplified Chinese: 赵元任
Transcriptions
Standard Mandarin
- Hanyu Pinyin: Zhào Yuánrèn
- Bopomofo: ㄓㄠˋ ㄩㄢˊ ㄖㄣˋ
- Gwoyeu Romatzyh: Jaw Yuanrenn
- Wade–Giles: Chao^{4} Yüan^{2}-jên^{4}
- Tongyong Pinyin: Jhào Yuánrèn
- Yale Romanization: Jàu Ywánrèn
- MPS2: Jàu Yuánrèn
- IPA: [ʈʂâʊ ɥɛ̌n.ɻə̂n]
Gan
- Romanization: Ceu5 Ngion4 Nin5
Yue: Cantonese
- Yale Romanization: Jiuh Yùhn-yahm
- Jyutping: Ziu6 Jyun4-jam6
- IPA: [tsiw˨ jyn˩.jɐm˨]
Southern Min
- Hokkien POJ: Tiō Goân-jīm
- Tâi-lô: Tiō Guân-jīm

Yuen Ren Chao (traditional Chinese: 趙元任; simplified Chinese: 赵元任; pinyin: Zhào Yuánrèn; 3 November 1892 – 25 February 1982) was a Chinese-American linguist, musician, and polymath. Applying modern linguistic theory and scientific methods to the study of Chinese phonology, dialects, and grammar, Chao was a leading advocate of the National Language Movement and a principal architect of the Gwoyeu Romatzyh romanization system. His Mandarin Primer was among the most widely used Chinese textbooks of the twentieth century. From 1938 onward, he lived in the United States.

== Early life and education ==
Chao was born in Tianjin in 1892, though his family's ancestral home was in Changzhou, Jiangsu. Because he moved around a lot as a child, he learned to speak four different Chinese languages by the time he was 12. In 1910, Chao went to the United States with a Boxer Indemnity Scholarship to study mathematics and physics at Cornell University, where he was a classmate and lifelong friend of Hu Shih (1891–1962), the leader of the New Culture Movement. He then became interested in philosophy; in 1918, he earned a PhD in philosophy from Harvard University with a dissertation entitled "Continuity: Study in Methodology".

Already in college his interests had turned to music and languages. He spoke German and French fluently and some Japanese, and he had a reading knowledge of Ancient Greek and Latin. He was Bertrand Russell's interpreter during Russell's visit to China in 1920. In My Linguistic Autobiography, Chao wrote of his ability to pick up a Chinese dialect quickly, without much effort. Chao possessed a natural gift for hearing fine distinctions in pronunciation that was said to be "legendary for its acuity", enabling him to record the sounds of various dialects with a high degree of accuracy.

== Career development ==
In 1920, Chao returned to China and taught mathematics at Tsinghua University. The next year, he returned to the United States to teach at Harvard University. In 1925, he again returned to China, teaching linguistics and music courses at Tsinghua, and in 1926 began a survey of the Wu dialects. While at Tsinghua, Chao was considered one of the 'Four Great Teachers / Masters' of China, alongside Wang Guowei, Liang Qichao, and Chen Yinke.

He began to conduct linguistic fieldwork throughout China for the Institute of History and Philology of Academia Sinica from 1928 onwards. During this period of time, he collaborated with Luo Changpei, another leading Chinese linguist of his generation, to translate Bernhard Karlgren's Études sur la Phonologie Chinoise (published in 1940) into Chinese.

In 1938, he left for the US and resided there afterwards. In 1945, he served as president of the Linguistic Society of America, and in 1966 a special issue of the society's journal Language was dedicated to him. In 1954, he became an American citizen. In the 1950s he was among the first members of the Society for General Systems Research and he also participated in the Macy conferences. From 1947 to 1960, he taught at the University of California at Berkeley, where in 1952, he became Agassiz Professor of Oriental Languages.

== Grammar and linguistic works ==
Chart said to be invented by Chao, illustrating the contours four tones in Standard Chinese.

While in the United States in 1921, Chao recorded Old National Pronunciation gramophone records, which were then distributed nationally as proposed by Commission on the Unification of Pronunciation as part of its failed campaign to manufacture a unified Standard Chinese.

He is the author of one of the most important standard modern works on Chinese grammar, A Grammar of Spoken Chinese, which was translated into Chinese separately by Lü Shuxiang in 1979 and by Ting Pang-hsin in 1980. It was an expansion of the grammar chapters in his earlier textbooks, Mandarin Primer and Cantonese Primer. He was co-author of the Concise Dictionary of Spoken Chinese, which was the first dictionary to characterize Chinese characters as bound or free—usable only in polysyllables or permissible as a monosyllabic word, respectively.

Chao invented the General Chinese phonetic system to represent the pronunciations of all major varieties of Chinese simultaneously. It is not specifically a romanization system, but two alternate systems: one uses Chinese characters phonetically as a syllabary, and the other is an alphabetic romanization system with similar sound values and tone spellings to Gwoyeu Romatzyh. On 26 September 1928, Gwoyeu Romatzyh was officially adopted by the Republic of China—led at the time by the Kuomintang (KMT). The corresponding entry in Chao's diary, written in GR, reads G.R. yii yu jeou yueh 26 ry gong buh le. Hoo-ray!!! ("G.R. was officially announced on September 26. Hooray!!!") Chao also contributed Chao tone letters to the International Phonetic Alphabet.

His translation of Lewis Carroll's Alice's Adventures in Wonderland, where he tried his best to preserve all the word plays of the original, is considered "a classical piece of verbal art."

Chao published Hu Mingfu's "Lion-Eating Poet in the Stone Den" in 1916, among the earliest Chinese one-syllable articles. He refined it to the point it eventually consisted only of 92 characters with the syllable shi in Modern Standard Mandarin, only varying by tone. When written out using Chinese characters the text can be understood, but it is incomprehensible when read out aloud in Standard Chinese, and therefore also incomprehensible on paper when written in romanized form. He went on to produce other poems of similar nature, making an argumentum ad absurdum against the romanization of Literary Chinese.

Chao translated Jabberwocky into Chinese by inventing characters to imitate what Rob Gifford describes as the "slithy toves that gyred and gimbled in the wabe of Carroll's original".

== Musical works ==
In 1928, [published 'New Poetry Songbook' ...]. Chao has a vision of erasing the distinction between Western music and Worldly music. He believed this distinction pushed a narrative that Western music was well-developed whereas Chinese music was under-developed.

His composition "How could I help thinking of her" was a pop hit during the 1930s in China; its lyrics were penned by fellow linguist Liu Bannong.

He published a collection of children's songs in 1935.

== Family and later life ==
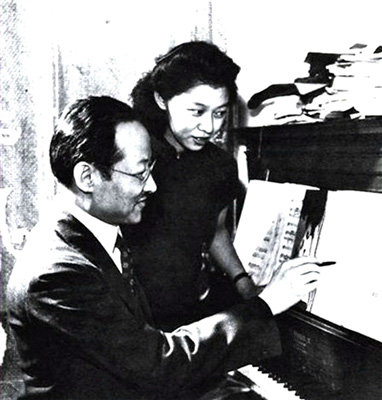
Chao (seated left) with his eldest daughter Iris Rulan Chao Pian

Chao married the physician Yang Buwei in 1920. The ceremony was simple, as opposed to traditional weddings, attended only by Hu Shih and one other friend. Hu's account of it in the newspapers made the couple a model of modern marriage for China's New Culture generation.

Yang Buwei published How to Cook and Eat in Chinese in 1946, and the book went through many editions. Their daughter Rulan wrote the English text and Mr. Chao developmentally edited the text based on Mrs. Chao's developed recipes, as well as her experiences gathering recipes in various areas of China. Among the three of them, they coined the terms "pot sticker" and "stir fry" for the book, terms which are now widely accepted, and the recipes popularized various related techniques. His presentation of his wife's recipe for "Stirred Eggs" is a classic of American comic writing.

Both Chao and his wife Yang were known for their good senses of humor, he particularly for his love of subtle jokes and language puns: they published a family history entitled, Life with Chaos: the autobiography of a Chinese family. Their first daughter Rulan Chao Pian (1922–2013) was Professor of East Asian Studies and Music at Harvard. Their second daughter Nova Chao (1923–2020) was a Harvard-trained chemist, professor at Central South University and member of the Chinese Academy of Engineering. Their third daughter Lensey was born in 1929; she is a children's book author and mathematician.

Late in his life, Chao was invited by Deng Xiaoping to return to China in 1981. Previously at the invitation of Premier Zhou Enlai, he and his wife returned to China in 1973 for the first time since the 1940s. After his wife died in March 1981 he visited China again between May and June. He died in Cambridge, Massachusetts.

In the 1990s the Yuen Ren Society, an organization to promote Chinese dialect fieldwork, was named after Chao.

== Selected bibliography ==
- "A system of 'tone-letters'", Le Maître Phonétique, 3, vol. 8, no. 45, pp. 24–27, 1930, JSTOR 44704341
- "The Non-uniqueness of Phonemic Solutions of Phonetic Systems" (PDF), Bulletin of the Institute of History and Philology, vol. 4, no. 4, Academia Sinica, pp. 363–398, 1934, archived from the original (PDF) on 11 November 2025
- Karlgren, Bernhard; Chao, Yuen Ren; Li, Fang-Kuei; Luo, Changpei (1940), 中国音韵学研究 [Study on Chinese Phonology], The Commercial Press
- Chao, Yuen Ren; Yang, Lien-sheng (1947), Concise Dictionary of Spoken Chinese, Cambridge, MA: Harvard University Press
- Cantonese Primer, Cambridge, MA: Harvard University Press, 1947
- Mandarin Primer, Cambridge, MA: Harvard University Press, 1948
- Grammar of Spoken Chinese, Berkeley: University of California Press, 1965
- "What Is Correct Chinese?", Journal of the American Oriental Society, 81 (3): 171–177, 1961, doi:10.2307/595651, JSTOR 595651
- Language and symbolic systems, Cambridge University Press, 1968, ISBN 978-0-521-04616-9
- Chao, Yuen Ren (1976), Aspects of Chinese Sociolinguistics: Essays, Stanford University Press, ISBN 978-0-8047-0909-5
