= Classical Chinese =

Literary form of written Chinese

- Literary Chinese
- 文言
- Region: The Sinosphere: China; Japan; Ryukyu Islands; Korea; Vietnam
- Era: Broad sense c. 11th century BCE – c. 3rd century CE (Western Zhou to Eastern Han dynasties of China); Narrow sense c. 6th century BCE – c. 3rd century BCE (Late Spring and Autumn to Warring States periods of China); Widely used as a literary language across East Asia until the 20th century
- Language family: Sino-Tibetan: Sinitic; Chinese; Classical Chinese
- Writing system: Chinese characters

Language codes
- ISO 639-3: lzh
- Glottolog: lite1248
- Linguasphere: 79-AAA-aa

Classical Chinese

Chinese name
- Chinese: 文言
- Literal meaning: literary language
Transcriptions
Standard Mandarin
- Hanyu Pinyin: wényán
- Bopomofo: ㄨㄣˊ ㄧㄢˊ
- Gwoyeu Romatzyh: wenyan
- Wade–Giles: wen^{2}-yen^{2}
- Tongyong Pinyin: wúnyán
- Yale Romanization: wén-yán
- IPA: [wə̌n.jɛ̌n]
Wu
- Romanization: ven^{去} ghe
Gan
- Romanization: mun^{4}-ngien^{4}
Hakka
- Pha̍k-fa-sṳ: vùn-ngièn
Yue: Cantonese
- Yale Romanization: màhnyìhn
- Jyutping: man4 jin4
- IPA: [mɐn˩.jin˩]
Southern Min
- Hokkien POJ: bûn-giân
Eastern Min
- Fuzhou BUC: ùng-ngiòng
Middle Chinese
- Middle Chinese: mjun ngjon
Old Chinese
- Baxter–Sagart (2014): *mən ŋan

Alternative Chinese name
- Chinese: 古文
- Literal meaning: ancient writing
Transcriptions
Standard Mandarin
- Hanyu Pinyin: gǔwén
- Bopomofo: ㄍㄨˇ ㄨㄣˊ
- Gwoyeu Romatzyh: guuwen
- Wade–Giles: ku^{3}-wên^{2}
- Tongyong Pinyin: gǔwún
- Yale Romanization: gǔ-wén
- IPA: [kù.wə̌n]
Wu
- Romanization: ku^{去} ven^{去}
Gan
- Romanization: gu^{3}-mun^{4}
Hakka
- Pha̍k-fa-sṳ: kú-vùn
Yue: Cantonese
- Yale Romanization: gúmàhn
- Jyutping: gu2 man4
- IPA: [ku˧˥.mɐn˩]
Southern Min
- Hokkien POJ: kó͘-bûn
Eastern Min
- Fuzhou BUC: gū-ùng
Middle Chinese
- Middle Chinese: ku^{X} mjun
Old Chinese
- Baxter–Sagart (2014): *kˤaʔ mən

Vietnamese name
- Vietnamese alphabet: Hán văn; văn ngôn
- Chữ Hán: 漢文; 文言

Korean name
- Hangul: 한문
- Hanja: 漢文
Transcriptions
- Revised Romanization: hanmun

Japanese name
- Kanji: 漢文
Transcriptions
- Romanization: kanbun

Classical Chinese (Note: Chinese language terms include 古文; gǔwén; 'ancient writing' and 文言; wényán; 'literary language', as well as 文言文; wényánwén; "literary language writing" in written vernacular Chinese. It can also be called 汉文; 漢文; Hànwén; 'Han writing', read as kanbun in Japanese, hanmun in Korean, and văn ngôn or Hán văn in Vietnamese. The first two Chinese terms, read kobun and bungo, most often refer to Classical Japanese when used in Japanese.) is the style of Chinese language in which the classics of Chinese literature were written, from c. the 5th century BCE. For millennia thereafter, the syntax of written Chinese used in these works was imitated and iterated upon by scholars in a form now called Literary Chinese, which was used for almost all formal writing in China until the early 20th century. Compared to modern vernacular Chinese, each written character in Classical Chinese almost always corresponds to a single independent word, and as a result the language is characteristically terse and can be difficult to understand for readers without literary training and experience.

Starting in the 2nd century CE, use of Literary Chinese spread to surrounding countries that were heavily influenced by Chinese culture such as Vietnam, Korea, Japan and the Ryukyu Islands, where it represented the only known common form of writing for a long time in those countries' history. Even after the inventions of local writings, Literary Chinese was adopted as the international auxiliary language for civil administration and scholarly communication in these countries, creating what is known as the Sinosphere. Each additionally developed systems of readings and annotations that enabled non-Chinese speakers to interpret Literary Chinese texts in terms of the local vernacular.

While not static throughout its history, its evolution has traditionally been guided by a conservative impulse: many later changes in the varieties of Chinese are not reflected in the literary form. Due to millennia of this evolution, Literary Chinese is only partially intelligible when read or spoken aloud for someone only familiar with modern vernacular forms. Literary Chinese has largely been replaced by written vernacular Chinese among Chinese speakers; speakers of non-Chinese languages have similarly abandoned Literary Chinese in favour of their own local vernaculars. Although varieties of Chinese have diverged in various directions from the Old Chinese words in the Classical lexicon, many cognates can still be found.

== Definition ==
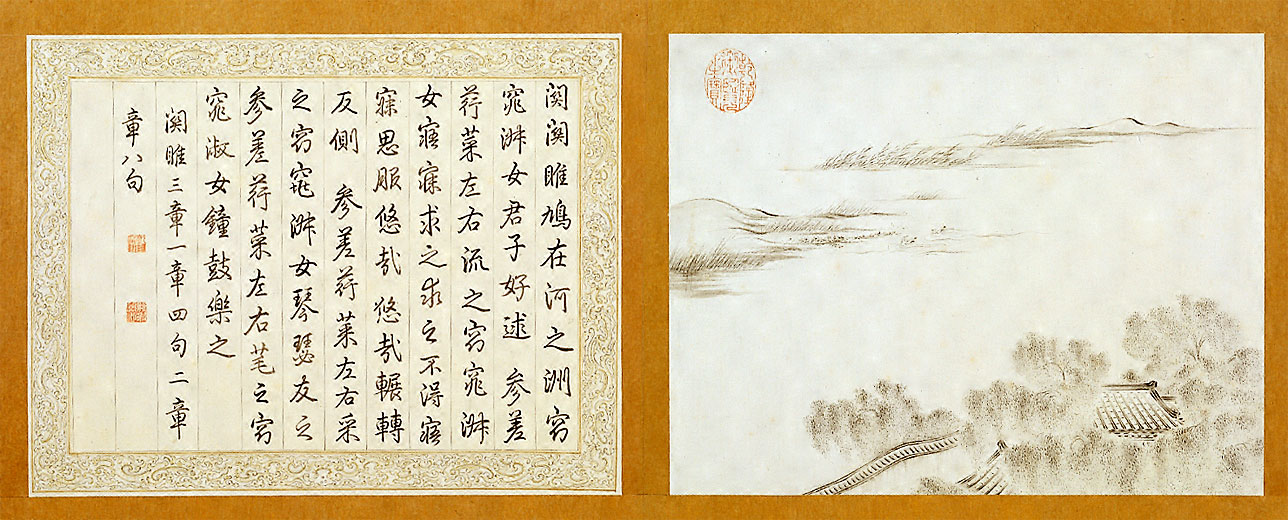
The Classic of Poetry, a collection of 305 literary works authored between the 11th and 7th centuries BCE in what is generally termed "pre-Classical Chinese"

There is no universal agreement on the definition of "Classical Chinese". At its core, the term refers to the language used by the classics of Chinese literature roughly from the start of the Zhou dynasty (ca. 1046 BCE – 256 BCE) to the end of the Han dynasty (202 BCE – 220 CE). The form of Chinese used in works written before the 6th century BCE, including many Zhou bronzeware inscriptions and a significant portion of the Five Classics, is distinct from that found in later works. The term "pre-Classical Chinese" is used to distinguish this form from Classical Chinese proper. Despite the importance of the Five Classics, the archaic language from this time period became difficult for later writers to fully comprehend and therefore did not serve as models for imitation in the way texts from the Spring and Autumn and Warring States periods did. At the other end of the time period, works from the centuries immediately after Qin unification in 221 BCE (e.g., Sima Qian's Shiji and Wang Chong's Lunheng) contain "post-Classical" innovations in grammar and vocabulary that reflected features of the spoken language of the Han dynasty and were excluded from imitation by later writers for being overly colloquial. Thus, in a narrower sense, the Classical period constitutes a much shorter period, which has been conventionally defined to begin with the life of Confucius (551–479 BCE) and end with the founding of the Qin dynasty in 221 BCE.

Starting from the Han dynasty, the divergence of spoken language from the literary form became increasingly apparent. The term "Literary Chinese" has been coined to refer to the later forms of written Chinese in conscious imitation of the classics, with sinologists generally emphasizing distinctions from "true" Classical Chinese such as the gradual addition of new vocabulary and the erosion of certain points of Classical grammar as their functions were forgotten. Literary Chinese was used in almost all formal and personal writing in China from the end of the Han dynasty until the early 20th century, when it was largely replaced by written vernacular Chinese. Therefore, one could define Literary Chinese as an artificial continuation of Zhou dynasty Classical Chinese as a literary language.

== Function ==
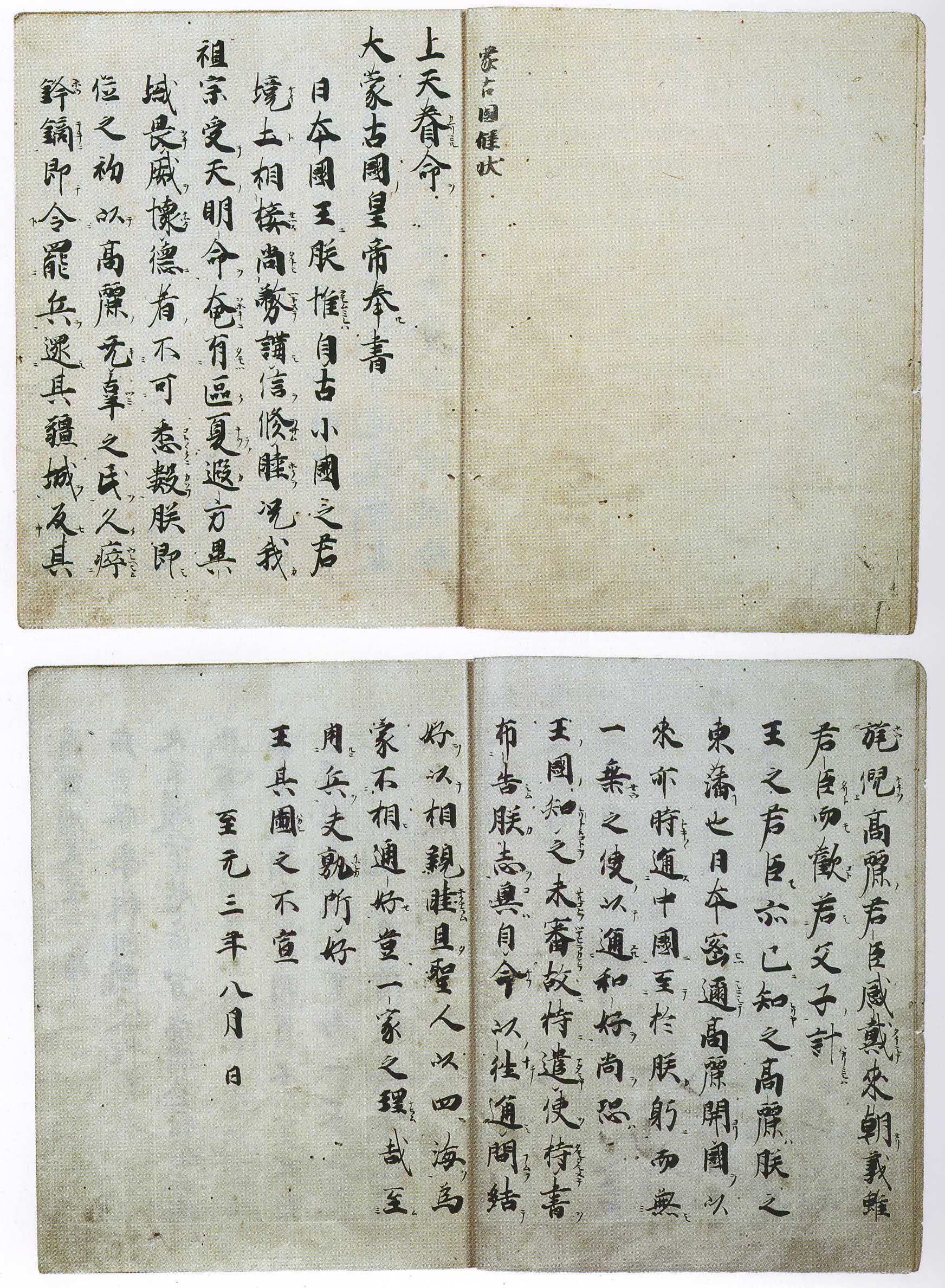
A Literary Chinese letter written in 1266, addressed to the "King of Japan" (日本國王) on behalf of Kublai Khan, prior to the Mongol invasions of Japan. Annotations explaining points of grammar have been added to the text, intended to aid Japanese-speaking readers.

The adoption of Chinese literary culture in the Sinosphere amid the existence of various regional vernaculars is an example of diglossia. The coexistence of Literary Chinese and native languages throughout China, Japan, Korea, and Vietnam can be compared to the historical literary use of Latin in Europe, that of Old Church Slavonic in the Eastern Orthodox world, that of Arabic in Persia, or that of Sanskrit and Pali in South and Southeast Asia. However, unlike these examples, written Chinese uses a logography of Chinese characters that are not directly tied to their pronunciation. This lack of a fixed correspondence between writing and reading created a situation where later readings of Classical Chinese texts were able to diverge much further from their originals than occurred in the other literary traditions, adding a unique dimension to the study of Literary Chinese.

Literary Chinese was adopted in Korea, Japan, and Vietnam. The Oxford Handbook of Classical Chinese Literature states that this adoption came mainly from diplomatic and cultural ties with China, while conquest, colonization, and migration played smaller roles. Unlike Latin and Sanskrit, historical Chinese language theory consisted almost exclusively of lexicography, as opposed to the study of grammar and syntax. Such approaches largely arrived with Europeans beginning in the 17th century. Christian missionaries later coined the term 文理 (wénlǐ; 'principles of literature', 'bookish language') to describe Classical Chinese; this term never became widely used among domestic speakers.

=== Transmission of texts ===
According to the traditional "burning of books and burying of scholars" account, in 213 BCE Qin Shi Huang ordered the historical records of all non-Qin states to be burned, along with any literature associated with the Hundred Schools of Thought. The imperial library was destroyed upon the dynasty's collapse in 206 BCE, resulting in a potentially greater loss. Even works from the Classical period that have survived are not known to exist in their original forms, and are attested only in manuscripts copied centuries after their original composition. The "Yiwenzhi" section of the Book of Han (111 CE) is the oldest extant bibliography of Classical Chinese, compiled c. 90 CE; only 6% of its 653 listed works are known to exist in a complete form, with another 6% existing only in fragments.

== Modern use ==
Prior to the literary revolution in China that began with the 1919 May Fourth Movement, prominent examples of vernacular Chinese literature include the 18th-century novel Dream of the Red Chamber. Most government documents in the Republic of China were written in Literary Chinese until reforms spearheaded by President Yen Chia-kan in the 1970s marked a shift towards written vernacular Chinese. However, most of the laws of Taiwan are still written in a subset of Literary Chinese. As a result, it is necessary for modern Taiwanese lawyers to learn at least a subset of the literary language. In a similar fashion Law French and Law Latin still play some role in the Anglophone tradition of jurisprudence and lawyers needed to have good knowledge of them in the past though less so today.

Many works of literature in Classical and Literary Chinese have been highly influential in Chinese culture, such as the canon of Tang poetry. However, even with knowledge of its grammar and vocabulary, works in Literary Chinese can be difficult for native vernacular speakers to understand, due to its frequent allusions and references to other historical literature, as well as the extremely laconic style. Presently, pure Literary Chinese is occasionally used in formal or ceremonial contexts. For example, the National Anthem of the Republic of China is in Literary Chinese. Buddhist texts in Literary Chinese are still preserved from the time they were composed or translated from Sanskrit. In practice there is a socially accepted continuum between vernacular and Literary Chinese. For example, most official notices and formal letters use stock literary expressions (such as chengyu) within vernacular prose.

Personal use of Classical phrases depends on factors such as the subject matter and the level of education of the writer. Excepting professional scholars and enthusiasts, most modern writers cannot easily write in Literary Chinese. Even so, most Chinese people with at least a middle school education are able to read basic Literary Chinese, because this ability is part of the Chinese middle school and high school curricula, and is a component of the college entrance examination. Literary Chinese in the school curriculum is taught primarily by presenting a literary work and including a vernacular gloss that explains the meaning of phrases. The examinations usually require the student to read a paragraph in Literary Chinese and then explain its meaning in the vernacular.

Contemporary use of Literary Chinese in Japan is mainly in the field of education and the study of literature. Learning kanbun, the Japanese readings of Literary Chinese, is part of the high school curriculum in Japan.

== Pronunciation ==
Classical Chinese was a written medium, but in early and medieval China (as in Europe in those periods), reading usually meant reading aloud. The phrase 誦讀之聲 (sòngdú zhī shēng 'the sound of reading') came to refer more broadly to the study of texts and even education in general.

However, the script contained only approximate and relative information about pronunciation at the time characters were created. The vast majority of characters, including almost all of those for less common words, were phono-semantic compounds, consisting of a character for a word with similar pronunciation together with a disambiguating semantic marker. Most researchers studying Old Chinese agree that characters sharing phonetic components denoted words with initial consonants at the same place of articulation, the same main vowel and the same main final consonant. Generally the manner of articulation of initials and other consonants in initial and final clusters were disregarded for this purpose (though nasals were distinguished from obstruents). As pronunciations changed over time, these connections became obscured.

In the Eastern Han period, commentaries on the classics began to remark on pronunciations of difficult words. Pronunciations are compared to those of other words, but it is often not clear how similar they are intended to be. Nevertheless, these comments reveal considerable regional variation in pronunciation.

The fanqie method, developed in the 2nd century CE, provided a precise description of the pronunciation of a monosyllabic word in terms of a pair of words with the same initial and final parts respectively. During the Northern and Southern dynasties period, the tones of the language were described by authors such as Shen Yue promoting poetic styles requiring a fixed pattern of tones. Dictionaries began to appear, giving the pronunciation of every character found in the classics.

The most successful of these dictionaries was the Qieyun (601). This work was created by Lu Fayan, based on a plan devised at a meeting 20 years earlier, in which Lu and his friends lamented the variation in pronunciation and rhyming standards in different areas. Lu drew on several previous dictionaries to produce a system encompassing distinctions in the most prestigious standards, those of the northern capital Luoyang and the southern capital Jinling (modern Nanjing). By the middle of the 7th century, the Qieyun had become the official standard to which verse and prose compositions for the imperial examination were required to conform. The book became very popular, and went through a series of revisions over the following centuries. The earlier dictionaries, including those on which it drew, were lost.

By the Northern and Southern dynasties period, as a result of sound change many of the verses in early texts no longer rhymed. The Jingdian Shiwen (late 6th century) contains many quotations of commentators recommending changes of pronunciation of particular words to make a rhyme consonant. The emperor Xuanzong went further, issuing a decree in 725 replacing a character in the Book of Documents in order to fix a rhyme. Adjustments of pronunciation ('harmonizing the rhymes') became popular in the Song dynasty, especially in the commentaries of Zhu Xi. The Ming scholar Yang Shen lampooned this practice:

In this way, "east" can also be pronounced "west", "south" can also be pronounced "north", "up" can also be pronounced "down", and "front" can also be pronounced "back". No character has a correct reading, and the Odes have no correct characters.

By the time of the Yuan and Ming dynasties, dictionaries reflected the phonology of early Mandarin. As the imperial examination system required the candidate to compose poetry in the shi genre, pronunciation in non-Mandarin speaking parts of China such as Zhejiang, Guangdong and Fujian is either based on everyday speech, such as in Standard Cantonese, or is based on a special set of pronunciations borrowed from Classical Chinese, such as in Southern Min. In practice, all varieties of Chinese combine the two extremes of pronunciation: that according to a prescribed system, versus that based on everyday speech. Mandarin and Cantonese, for example, also have words that are pronounced one way in colloquial usage and another way when used in Literary Chinese or in specialized terms coming from Literary Chinese, though the system is not as extensive as that of Min or Wu.

Japanese, Korean, and Vietnamese readers of Literary Chinese each use distinct systems of pronunciation specific to their own languages. Japanese speakers have readings of Chinese origin called on'yomi for many words, such as for "ginko" (銀行) or "Tokyo" (東京), but use kun'yomi when the kanji represents a native word such as the reading of 行 in 行く (iku) or the reading of both characters in "Osaka" (大阪), as well as a system that aids Japanese speakers with a Classical word order.

As pronunciation in modern varieties is different from Old Chinese as well as other historical forms such as Middle Chinese, characters that once rhymed may not any longer, or vice versa. Poetry and other rhyme-based writing thus becomes less coherent than the original reading must have been. However, some modern Chinese varieties have certain phonological characteristics that are closer to the older pronunciations than others, as shown by the preservation of certain rhyme structures.

Another particular characteristic of Literary Chinese is its present homophony. Reading Classical texts with character pronunciations from modern languages results in many homophonous characters that originally had distinct Old Chinese pronunciations, but have since merged to varying degrees. This phenomenon is far more common in Chinese languages than in English: for example, all of the following words had distinct Old Chinese pronunciations, but are now perfect homophones with a pronunciation of yì [î] in Standard Chinese:

*ŋjajs	議; 'discuss'	*ŋjət	仡; 'powerful'
*ʔjup	邑; 'city'	*ʔjək	億; '100 million'
*ʔjəks	意; 'thought'	*ʔjek	益; 'increase'
*ʔjik	抑; 'press down'	*jak	弈; 'Go'
*ljit	逸; 'flee'	*ljək	翼; 'wing'
*ljek	易; 'change'	*ljeks	易; 'easy'
*slek	蜴; 'lizard'.

The poem Lion-Eating Poet in the Stone Den was composed during the 1930s by the linguist Yuen Ren Chao to demonstrate this: it contains only words pronounced shi [ʂɻ̩] with various tones in modern Standard Chinese. The poem underlines how language had become impractical for modern speakers: when spoken aloud, Literary Chinese is largely incomprehensible. However, the poem is perfectly comprehensible when read, and also uses homophones that were present even in Old Chinese.

Romanizations have been devised to provide distinct spellings for Literary Chinese words, together with pronunciation rules for various modern varieties. The earliest was the Romanisation Interdialectique by French missionaries Henri Lamasse of the Paris Foreign Missions Society and Ernest Jasmin, based on Middle Chinese, followed by linguist Wang Li's Wényán luómǎzì based on Old Chinese in 1940, and then by Chao's General Chinese romanization in 1975. However, none of these systems have seen extensive use.

== Grammar and lexicon ==
Compared to written vernacular Chinese, Classical Chinese is terse and compact in its style, and uses some different vocabulary. Classical Chinese rarely uses words two or more characters in length.

Classical Chinese can be described as a pro-drop language: its syntax often allows either subjects or objects to be dropped when their reference is understood. Additionally, words are generally not restricted to use as certain parts of speech: many characters may function as either a noun, verb, or adjective. There is no general copula in Classical Chinese akin to how 是 (shì) is used in modern Standard Chinese. Characters that can sometimes function as a copula in specific circumstances include 為 (wéi; 'make', 'do') when indicating temporary circumstances, and 曰 (yuē; 'say') when used in the sense of 'to be called'.

Classical Chinese has more pronouns compared to the modern vernacular. In particular, whereas modern Standard Chinese has one character generally used as a first-person pronoun, Classical Chinese has several—many of which are used as part of a system of honorifics. Many final and interrogative particles are found in Classical Chinese.

Beyond differences in grammar and vocabulary, Classical Chinese can be distinguished by its literary qualities: an effort to maintain parallelism and rhythm is typical, even in prose works. Works also make extensive use of literary techniques such as allusion, which contributes to the language's brevity.

== See also ==
- Classical Chinese poetry
- Buddhist Chinese
- Gugyeol
- Giải âm
- Sino-Xenic vocabulary
  - Sino-Japanese vocabulary
  - Sino-Korean vocabulary
  - Sino-Vietnamese vocabulary
- Brushtalk
- Literary language
- Classical language
