= James while John had had had had had had had had had had had a better effect on the teacher =

Grammatically correct sentence demonstrating lexical ambiguity

"James while John had had had had had had had had had had had a better effect on the teacher" is a nearly grammatically correct English sentence used to demonstrate lexical ambiguity and the necessity of punctuation, which can also mark the intonation, stress, and pauses found in speech. In human information processing research, the sentence has been used to show how readers depend on punctuation to give sentences meaning, especially in the context of scanning across lines of text. The sentence is sometimes presented as a puzzle, where the solver must add the punctuation.

== Meaning ==
The sentence refers to two students, James and John, who are required by an English teacher to describe a man who had suffered from a cold in the past. John writes "The man had a cold", which the teacher marks incorrect, while James writes the correct "The man had had a cold". James's answer, being more grammatical, resulted in a better impression on the teacher.

The sentence is easier to understand with added punctuation and emphasis:

James, while John had had had, had had had had; had had had had a better effect on the teacher.

In each of the five pairs of "had" in the above sentence, the first "had" in the pair is in the past perfect form. Each second "had" in the first two pairs is interchangeable with "written" or "answered." The italicized instances denote emphasis of intonation, focusing on the differences in the students' answers, then finally identifying the correct one.

Thus, the sentence is synonymous with the easy to understand form:

James, while John had written had, had written had had; had had had had a better effect on the teacher.

Or potentially more clearly:

John had written had, but James had written had had, and had had had had a better effect on the teacher.

In this form, the introductory dependent clause is shifted and the subordinating conjunction "while" is replaced with the coordinating conjunction "but." The independent clauses are joined by the coordinating conjunction "and" instead of a semicolon.

Alternatively, the sentence can be read as John's answer being better than James's, simply by placing the same punctuation in a different arrangement through the sentence:

James, while John had had had had, had had had; had had had had a better effect on the teacher.

== Usage ==
The sentence can be given as a grammatical puzzle or an item on a test, for which one must find the proper punctuation to give it meaning. Hans Reichenbach used a similar sentence ("John where Jack had...") in his 1947 book Elements of Symbolic Logic as an exercise for the reader, to illustrate the different levels of language, namely object language and metalanguage. The intention was for the reader to add the needed punctuation for the sentence to make grammatical sense.

In research showing how people make sense of information in their environment, this sentence was used to demonstrate how seemingly arbitrary decisions can drastically change the meaning, analogous to how changes in the punctuation and quotes in the sentence show that the teacher alternately prefers James's work and John's work (e.g., compare: 'James, while John had had "had", had...' vs. 'James, while John had had "had had", ...').

The sentence is also used to show the semantic vagueness of the word had, as well as to demonstrate the difference between using a word and mentioning a word.

It has also been used as an example of the complexities of language, its interpretation, and its effects on a person's perceptions.

For the syntactic structure to be clear to a reader, this sentence requires, at a minimum, that the two phrases be separated by using a semicolon, period, en-dash or em-dash. Still, Jasper Fforde's novel The Well of Lost Plots employs a variation of the phrase to illustrate the confusion that may arise even from well-punctuated writing:

"Okay," said the Bellman, whose head was in danger of falling apart like a chocolate orange, "let me get this straight: David Copperfield, unlike Pilgrim's Progress, which had had 'had', had had 'had had'. Had 'had had' had TGC's approval?"

== See also ==
- Antanaclasis
- Buffalo buffalo Buffalo buffalo buffalo buffalo Buffalo buffalo
- Lion-Eating Poet in the Stone Den
- List of linguistic example sentences
