= Concise Dictionary of Spoken Chinese =

- Front cover of Concise Dictionary of Spoken Chinese.
- Author: Yuen Ren Chao, Lien Sheng Yang
- Language: Chinese, English
- Publisher: Harvard University Press
- Publication date: 1947
- Publication place: United States
- Media type: print
- Pages: xxxix, 292
- OCLC: 3393465

The Concise Dictionary of Spoken Chinese (1947), which was compiled by Yuen Ren Chao and Lien Sheng Yang, made numerous important lexicographic innovations. It was the first Chinese dictionary specifically for spoken Chinese words rather than for written Chinese characters, and one of the first to mark characters for being "free" or "bound" morphemes according to whether or not they can stand alone as a complete and independent utterance.

== History ==
The compilers of the Concise Dictionary of Chinese, the linguist Yuen Ren Chao (1892–1982) and the historian Yang Lien-sheng (1914–1990), were famous Chinese-American scholars who worked in Harvard University wartime Chinese language programs for the War Department. Chao was a visiting professor at Harvard from 1941 to 1946, while Yang entered the graduate program in 1940, and received an M.A. in 1942 and Ph.D. in 1946.

At the beginning of World War II, the shortage of Chinese and Japanese bilingual dictionaries became an urgent matter for English-speaking Allies. The Harvard–Yenching Institute said the need for Chinese dictionaries in America had "grown from chronic to acute", and selected two "practical dictionaries" to revise and reprint—without either author's permission—for "the immediate demands of American students". Both photolithographic reproductions were retitled: The Five Thousand Dictionary became Fenn's Chinese–English Pocket-Dictionary (1942) and A Chinese–English Dictionary: Compiled for the China Inland Mission by R. H. Mathews (1931) became Mathews' Chinese–English Dictionary (1943). Y. R. Chao contributed to both these reprints. He revised the introduction and wrote the Standards of Pronunciation, Styles of Pronunciation, and Tones sections for Fenn's, and wrote the Introduction on Pronunciation for Mathews'.

Yuen Ren Chao and Lien-sheng Yang divided the lexicographical work. Yang compiled the preliminary list of entries, partially drafted the definitions, served both as informant and as grammarian on Beijing dialect, and wrote the characters. Chao wrote most of the definitions, added pronunciations from regional varieties of Chinese, and wrote the front matter and the appendices. Chao and Yang finished compiling their Concise Dictionary of Spoken Chinese in 1945, the same year when the War Department published the anonymous Dictionary of Spoken Chinese: Chinese–English, English–Chinese. Although the 847-page Dictionary of Spoken Chinese is large, it contains relatively few lexical items, approximately 2,500 English–Chinese head entries in 500 pages and 5,000 Chinese–English ones in 300 pages.

The Chinese–English section's head entries are not single characters, as in traditional Chinese dictionaries, but monosyllabic and polysyllabic words, which are alphabetically collated using a newly devised system for romanizing Chinese (which became the prototype for Yale romanization). "This represents a radical departure from all earlier Chinese–English dictionaries, which were primarily dictionaries of Chinese characters (hànzi) and not of the spoken language as such". Although the Chinese–English section gives characters for head entries, they are treated as secondary. The Dictionary of Spoken Chinese records authentic colloquial pronunciation, and its chief function is to show a user how to employ the entries in spoken Chinese—in contrast, the chief function of previous bilingual dictionaries is to enable a user to decode written texts. Most entries provide one or more usage examples from colloquial speech. This dictionary classifies words into twelve complex grammatical categories: adjective (A), demonstrative (Dem), adverb (H), intransitive verb (I), conjunction (J), coverb (K), measure word (M), noun (N), numeral (Num), pronoun (Pron), resultative compound (RC) and transitive verb (V).

The Dictionary of Spoken Chinese's English–Chinese section averages around 5 entries per page, compared to around 18 per page in the Chinese–English section. Some English–Chinese entries are quite elaborate, providing multiple Chinese translation equivalents and usage examples illustrating various semantic nuances of the English word.

The influence of American structural linguistics, which shifted interest from the written to the spoken language, is evident in both the War Department's Dictionary of Spoken Chinese (1945) and Chao's and Yang's Concise Dictionary of Spoken Chinese (1947). "In both dictionaries we can observe the authors attempting not just to provide their Chinese entries with English equivalents but to demonstrate through grammatical categorization and examples how they are actually used".

Although the War Department dictionary was never widely distributed or used, it affected Chao's and Yang's Concise Dictionary of Spoken Chinese, and served as the model for two well-known dictionaries. Yale University's Institute of Far Eastern Languages published a revised edition Dictionary of Spoken Chinese (1966), and Fred Fangyu Wang published a two-volume Mandarin Chinese dictionary, Chinese–English (1967) and English–Chinese (1971). With these dictionaries, "American efforts in Chinese lexicography effectively ceased"—until the ABC Chinese–English Dictionary (1996). .

== Content ==
The Concise Dictionary of Spoken Chinese comprises approximately 5,000 single-character head entries, collated by radical-and-stroke and numbered according to the 214 Kangxi radicals. The twelve most frequent radicals are given at the bottom of the pages for the dictionary user to memorize. "To insure further the finding of the characters, the authors have entered each character under all its apparently possible radicals and made a cross reference to the main entry". For instance, 魯 luu is entered under radical 72 日 "sun", with the note "See Rad. 195 魚 ["fish"]." The Concise Dictionary includes the popular and cursive forms of many characters, as well as the Suzhou numerals (e.g., "〢 ell Soochow numeral for '2', used in trade"), and the Bopomofo symbols ("ㄎ ke National Phonetic letter for the aspirated initial k"), which had never been included in a Chinese dictionary, thus removing "one source of bewilderment for the foreign student of Chinese".

The Concise Dictionary has "many elaborate features to help the user study the refinements of spoken Chinese". Chao's introduction lists eight unique features not found in previous comparable Chinese–English dictionaries such as Fenn's and Mathews'.

(1) The grammatical function of each word is distinguished according to whether it is free (F) or bound (B). With the exception of measure words or Chinese classifiers, called "auxiliary nouns" (AN), the dictionary generally did not indicate syntactic part of speech, called "word classes". Chao explains, "The same word, as a noun, means one thing; as an auxiliary noun (AN) something else, as a verb something else again. This is not a matter of inference, as those who say that Chinese has no parts of speech assume, but a matter of individual facts.". The dictionary's English translation equivalents usually can clarify Chinese part of speech; if 吃 chy [chī] is defined by the English verb "to eat", then it is itself also a verb. word classes are only specified in cases of ambiguity; 脂肪 jyfang [zhīfáng] "fat" is marked n. "noun" since English "fat" can also be an adjective. The dictionary lists other specialized grammatical categories, for instance, "auxiliary nouns proper" and "quasi-auxiliary nouns", and introduces for the first time in a Chinese dictionary "many new ideas about the linguistic structure of Chinese, such as the four types of verbal complements": the "pre-transitive," "verb-object construction", "possessive object," and "impersonal verb-object compound"".

(2) The stylistic register or usage class of each entry is either marked by an abbreviation (e.g., derog., honorif., poet.) or implied in the translation (as 殆 "well-nigh," but 差不多 "almost"), in order to "channel the student's efforts in using the language to more profitable directions".

(3) The Concise Dictionary of Spoken Chinese is the first Chinese dictionary to give detailed descriptions of particles and interjections. For example, 了 has three entries:

- 了 leau [liǎo] "F [free] to finish, conclude" … -B [bound chiefly to a preceding word] "to a finish" … BB [the word reduplicated] to understand clearly", with 13 usage examples
- 了 .le [neutral tone, pinyin le] "-.B [bound, with neutral tone, to a preceding word] final particle to indicate a new situation or a new realization of an existing situation … in narration … to indicate obviousness", with 6 examples
- 了 .le "-.B word-particle: to indicate completed action when there is a numeral (or AN taking the place of 一) before the object … to indicate condition or time … to serve as a second compl. [complement] after a result. compl.", with 5 usage examples, and a lengthy note about negative le constructions

(4) Dictionary entries give morphological derivations, words created by adding affixes (e.g., 兒 erl [r], the "syllabic diminutive suffix, frequently used in verse") or by reduplication (單 dan [dān] single … 單單 "(this) only, alone; (this) of all things").

(5) Entries also give collocative words that are frequently used together (e.g., "棋 chyi [qí] "chess" … 下棋 "to play chess or go") and common antonyms. This dictionary "includes a great number of meanings even of well-known words which so far have not been noted in any other dictionary".

(6) The Gwoyeu Romatzyh "National Romanization" system, which Y.R. Chao co-created and popularized, is used for pronunciation of main entries, along with usual Wade–Giles orthography given in parentheses. Appendix 1, Part 2, is a table of concordance for these two systems. Tonal spelling of the four tones is the primary advantage of National Romanization, for instance, dau (1st tone), daur (2nd), dao (3rd), and daw (4th tone), corresponding to pinyin dāo, dáo, dǎo, and dào. The neutral tone is indicated by a dot before the atonal syllable.

(7) Romanizations incorporate superscripts and other symbols to denote the historical features of Middle Chinese pronunciation and modern pronunciation in varieties of Chinese, often misleadingly called "dialects". For examples, a subscribed dot under an initial (恤 ṣhiuh [xù] "to pity, to give relief to") makes it possible for students interested in Peking opera to distinguish 尖 "sharp" dental consonants from 圓 "rounded" palatal consonants, and a superscript ^{p} indicates Cantonese has a final -p checked tone and Wu Chinese has a glottal stop.

(8) All entries "are treated as morphemes, or monosyllabic meaningful spoken words", whether bound morphemes or free morphemes, rather than as characters. Chao gives a chemical analogy to differentiate between zìdiǎn 字典 "character dictionaries" and cídiǎn 辭典 "word dictionaries".

In China, dictionaries are divided into 字典 and 詞典, the former giving only single characters, which may be compared with chemical elements, and the latter compounds and phrases, like chemical compounds. To pursue the chemical analogy one step further, compounds are so numerous that they cannot all be included except in a much more comprehensive work. We can do more than merely list the elements and their atomic weights. We can classify their affinities, their electric polarity, indicate whether they can be ionized, and give such information as to enable us to predict more compounds than can be listed. Thus by giving the morphemes of the language properly analyzed, indicating whether they are bound or free, the attempt has been made to give the equivalent of a dictionary of compounds within the space of a dictionary of single words."

By treating all entries as bound or free morphemes rather than as characters, Chao and Yang have made an attempt to give the equivalent of a dictionary of compounds within the space of a dictionary of single words.

The dictionary's spine has English "Concise Dictionary of Spoken Chinese / Chao and Yang" and the front cover has equivalent Chinese "國語字典 [Guóyǔ zìdiǎn, "Mandarin Chinese Dictionary"] / 趙元任 / 楊聯陞 / 合編" ["Zhào Yuánrèn, Yáng Liánshēng, co-editors"]. The title page has both English "Concise Dictionary of Spoken Chinese / By Yuen Ren Chao and Lien Sheng Yang" and the same Chinese.

The Chinese character 道 (composed of radical 162 辶 "walk" and a shǒu 首 "head" phonetic) for dào "way; path; say; the Dao" or dǎo "guide; lead; instruct" makes a good sample entry for illustrating a dictionary because it has two pronunciations and complex semantics. Chao's and Yang's dictionary entry gives detailed syntactic and pragmatic information, but fails to note the pronunciation dǎo 道 that is a variant Chinese character for dǎo 導 (with radical 41 寸 "thumb") "to lead, to guide", which they do enter.

道 d̠aw. (tao^{4}). B way, reason, principle, Tao 道.理_{96}; -l a road AN 條, 個; AN a course (of food); -l, tz a streak AN a streak -l; F to say (introducing a direct quotation: novel style); B- to say (polite words), as 道喜_{30} v-o 'to congratulate,' 道謝 v-o 'to give thanks.' 有道 used at the end of the salutation in writing to a prominent scholar; 沒道.理 unreasonable; mean; rude.

First, this 道 entry glosses pronunciation with National Romanization d̠aw and Wade–Giles tao^{4}. The underscored d̠ consonant indicates a voiced initial in Wu and a lower register tone in Cantonese. Second, it gives English translation equivalents for the bound word (B) dàoli 道理, with the dot before 理 denoting neutral tone li, and the subscript 96 meaning radical 96 玉 "jade" where a dictionary user can find the character 理 lii listed under 96.7, with 7 being the number of strokes in the lǐ 里 phonetic. Third, it gives the colloquial term dàor 道兒 "road" with -l indicating the word plus the diminutive retroflex suffix -r 兒, counted with tiáo 條 "measure word for long, narrow things" (AN abbreviates "auxiliary noun"). Fourth, the entry notes that 道 itself is used as a measure word for courses during a meal. Fifth, dàor 道兒 or dàozi 道子 (tz denotes the noun suffix 子) can mean "streak", counted with tiáo 條 or ge 個 "general measure word". Sixth, dàor 道兒 can also be used as a measure word for streaks. Seventh, the free word (F) dào 道 dao means "to say". Eighth, it also means "to say (polite words)" in bound terms such as dàoxǐ 道喜 (subscript 30 denotes radical 30 口 "mouth"), dàoxiè 道謝, and yǒudào 有道. Ninth, the entry gives the bound word méi dàoli 沒道理. Chao's and Yang's brief 道 entry is packed with linguistic information for users.

== Reception ==
Most reviewers have praised the Concise Dictionary of Spoken Chinese, while some have been critical. The co-author Lien-Sheng Yang responded to DeFrancis' and Simon's reviews in a 1949 article about free and bound morphemes in Chinese.

The Chinese linguist Luo Changpei describes the dictionary as "unprecedented in the history of Chinese-European lexicography since its beginnings" in the early 17th century. Luo lists three unique features of the dictionary, combining six of the eight given by Chao (above); the first combines (1) and (3), the second (2), (7), (8), and the third is (6). Luo lists 15 corrections or suggestions, 9 of which are included in later editions of the dictionary, under Corrections and Additions.

The American linguist and lexicographer John DeFrancis described the Concise Dictionary as "a landmark notable for its presentation of a great deal of extremely valuable information—grammatical, phonetic, dialectical, and otherwise".

DeFrancis suggests that Chao and Yang have been "unduly influenced by the ideographs and the myths of Chinese monosyllabism". Although the dictionary title has "Spoken Chinese", the authors approach the subject through characters rather than through speech. Using data from a 10-page sample, DeFrancis disproves Chao's contention that with "very few exceptions" Chinese morphemes are "for the most part monosyllabic". The sample dictionary entries marked as "literary" (L), "comparable to yclept in English and hence not really belonging in a dictionary of spoken Chinese", amount to 16% of the total entries. (Yclept is an archaic or humorous word meaning "called; named".

Of the entries which really represent spoken forms, no more than 29 per cent have been classified by the authors as Free, the only category which is generally accepted as designating a word in English and other languages. But not all the remaining 71 per cent are classified as Bound forms of the type er in banker or sender. Only 49 per cent are of this type of meaningful syllables without independent life. The remaining 22 per cent, represented by shan and hu in shanhu, "coral," are of a type which have no more meaning or independence than do cor and al in the English equivalent.

DeFrancis proposes that the category of Bound syllables (not "words") should be divided into two groups: "meaningless bound syllables" (like shan and hu in shanhu 珊瑚 "coral") and "meaningful bound syllables" (like fu "father" and mu "mother" in fumu 父母 "parents"). "The former are fully bound (occurring in only one word), and the latter are semibound (occurring in more than one word)." DeFrancis concludes that the contributions of scholars like Dr. Chao, "give hope that lexicographers, if they can concentrate on Chinese speech and not be misled by the ideographic writing, will eventually succeed in compiling a real dictionary of the Chinese spoken language".

In response to DeFrancis' review, Lien-sheng Yang states that comparing the dictionary entries designated as literary to yclept in English is "misleading, because the latter is an archaic word, whereas the former are still used in modern Spoken Chinese". Yang says DeFrancis' suggestion of differentiating "meaningless bound syllables" and "meaningful bound syllables" appears interesting but unfortunately it involves three difficulties. First, since the word meaning is ambiguous, a linguist has to define "meaningful" and "meaningless" and ascertain whether all native-speaker informants agree. Second, a linguist needs to consider differences in the informants' background and education, "One syllable which is meaningful to one may be meaningless to another". Third, the identification of meaningful and meaningless syllables with those occurring in more than one word and those occurring in only one "is doubtful". Taking the example of shan and hu in shanhu "coral", Yang notes both characters are used in other compounds, namely, shanshan 珊珊 "tinkling sound (of ornaments)" and hulian 瑚璉 "two types of ritual vessels".

The German sinologist Walter Simon says the Concise Dictionary of Spoken Chinese is a "definite advance on our knowledge of the Chinese language" and calls it a "very important lexicographical contribution" from which "students cannot fail to derive great benefit". Simon says

[O]ne can readily see that a dictionary which notes the alternatives "free" or "bound" in the case of each single character, is a mine of information which may lend itself to very important subsequent research. Questions like the following come to the mind at once. "How many of the characters included in the dictionary occur only 'free' or only 'bound', how many occur with the suffix –tz or –l, what is the distribution if we proceed to grouping words according to their meanings (e.g., parts of the body)? Are practically all verbs free and all nouns 'bound', etc., etc.?"

Quoting this remark, Yang says, "These are good questions. The last one is particularly suggestive, because it leads to the question whether there are free and bound parts of speech."

Yu-Ju Chih, a teacher and developer of Chinese language textbooks, says that unlike almost all the commonly used Chinese–English dictionaries that are geared primarily to reading Chinese texts, the Concise Dictionary of Spoken Chinese is the "only one of its kind available to the public".
