= Fenn =

Fenn typically appears as a surname. Occasionally it appears as a middle name, pen name or name of a fictional character.

== Notable people with the name Fenn ==
=== As a surname ===
- Augustus H. Fenn (1844–1897), justice of the Connecticut Supreme Court
- Courtenay Hughes Fenn (1866–1927), American-Chinese Presbyterian missionary and father of Henry Courtenay Fenn
- Darren Fenn (born 1980), basketball player
- E. Hart Fenn (1856–1939), American national politician
- Ellenor Fenn (1743–1813), English writer
- George Manville Fenn (1831–1909), English author
- Geraldine Fenn (1912–1989), American professor
- Harry Fenn (1845–1911), English-American landscape illustrator
- Henry Courtenay Fenn (1894–1978), Chinese-American academic and son of Courtenay Hughes Fenn
- Hugh Fenn (died 1409), English official from Norfolk who served under Richard II and Henry IV
- Hugh Fenn (died 1476), English official from Norfolk who served under Henry VI and Edward IV
- Jaine Fenn, British science fiction author
- Jane Fenn Hoskens (1694–1794), English-American Quaker author
- Joanne Fenn (born 1974), English running athlete
- John Fenn (antiquarian) (1739–1794), English antiquarian who edited and published the Paston Letters
- John B. Fenn (1917–2010), American co-recipient of the Nobel Prize in Chemistry in 2002
- John Fenn (pirate) (died 1723), English pirate
- John Fenn (priest) (died 1615), English Roman Catholic priest and writer
- Lionel Fenn, pen name of American writer Charles L. Grant (1942–2006)
- Neale Fenn (born 1977), English-Irish footballer
- Nicholas Fenn (1936–2016), British diplomat
- Rick Fenn (born 1953), English rock guitarist
- Sereno Peck Fenn (1844–1927), American entrepreneur
- Sherilyn Fenn (born 1965), American actress
- Stephen S. Fenn (1820–1892), American national politician
- W. J. Fenn (1862–1961), illustrator

=== As a middle name ===
- Anthony Fenn Kemp (1773–1868), English-Australian soldier

=== As a first name ===
- Fenn Rosenthal (born 2016), author of Dinosaurs in Love

=== Fictional characters ===
- Fenn, character in Wilbur Smith's novel The Quest
- Fenn Rau, one of the Mandalorians from Star Wars fiction
- Fenn Shysa, another Mandalorian from Star Wars fiction

== See also ==
- Fenn's Moss, a nature reserve in the United Kingdom
- Fenn's Bank railway station
