= Kui (Chinese mythology) =

Polysemous figure in ancient Chinese mythology

Kui (Chinese: 夔; pinyin: kuí; Wade–Giles: k'uei) is a polysemous figure in ancient Chinese mythology. Classic texts use this name for the legendary musician Kui who invented music and dancing; for the one-legged mountain demon or rain-god Kui variously said to resemble a Chinese dragon, a drum, or a monkey with a human face; and for the Kuiniu wild yak or buffalo.

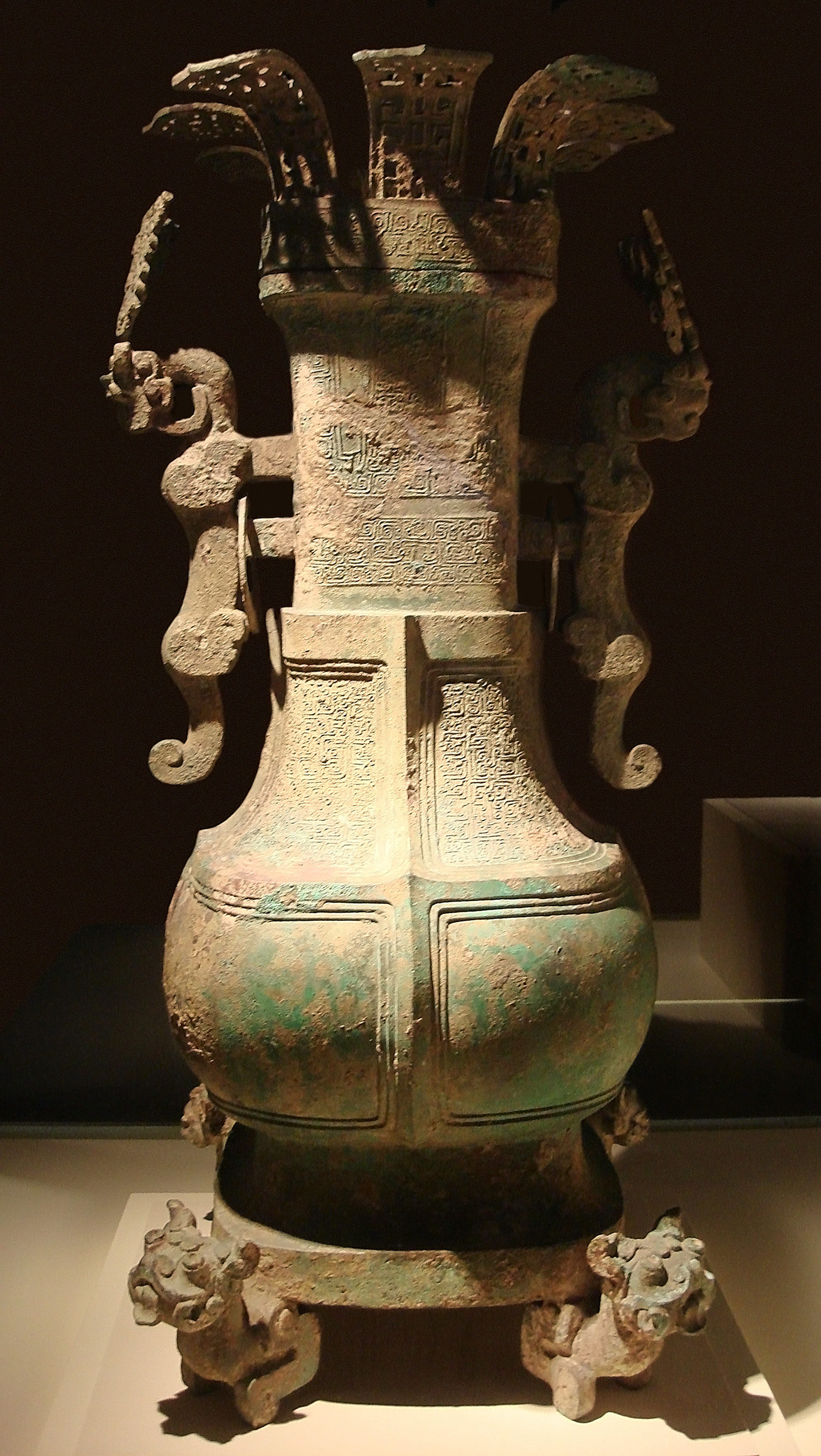
A Spring and Autumn period bronze vessel with coiled dragon patterns

== Word ==
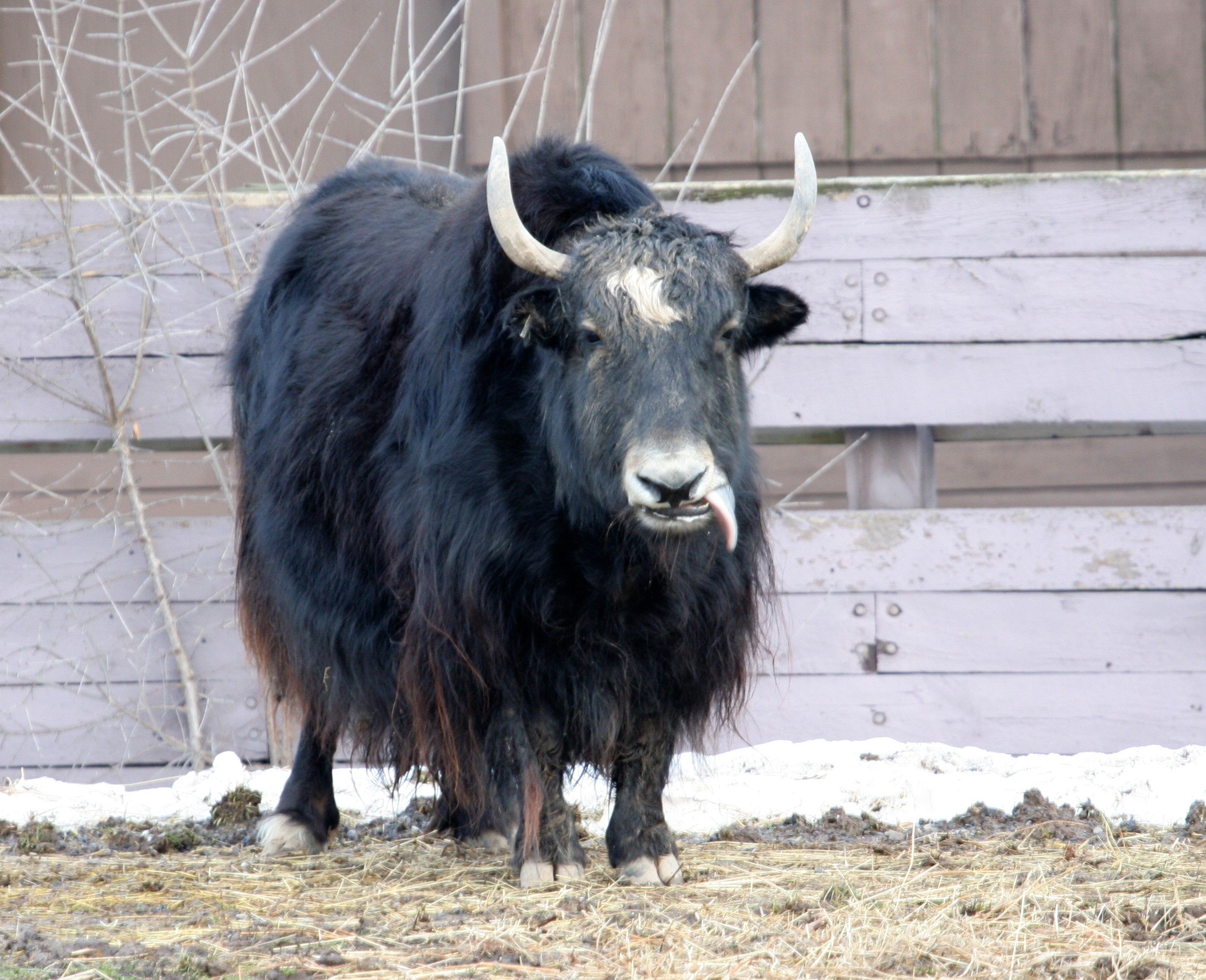
A yak (Bos grunniens)

While Kui (夔) originally named a mythic being, Modern Standard Chinese uses it in several other expressions. The reduplication kuíkuí (夔夔) means "awe-struck; fearful; grave" (see the Shujing below). The compounds kuílóng (夔龍) (with "dragon") and kuíwén (夔紋) (with "pattern; design") name common motifs on Zhou dynasty Chinese bronzes. The chengyu idiom yikuiyizu (一夔已足; 'one Kui already enough') means "one able person is enough for the job".

Kui is also a proper name. It is an uncommon one of the Hundred Family Surnames. Kuíguó (夔國) was a Warring States period state, located in present-day Zigui County (Hubei), that Chu annexed in 634 BCE. Kuizhou (夔州), located in present-day Fengjie County of Chongqing (Sichuan), was established in 619 CE as a Tang dynasty prefecture.

Kuiniu (夔牛 or 犪牛) is an old name for the "wild ox; wild yak". The (1578 CE) Bencao Gangmu entry for máoniú (氂牛; "wild yak"), which notes medicinal uses such as yak gallstones for "convulsions and delirium", lists kiuniu as a synonym for wéiniú (犩牛), "Larger than a cow. From the hills of Szechuan, weighing several thousand catties." The biological classification Bos grunniens (lit. "grunting ox") corresponds with the roaring Kui "god of rain and thunder" (see the Shanhaijing below).

Translating kuí (夔) as "walrus" exemplifies a ghost word. The Unihan Database lists the definition as "one-legged monster; walrus". However, Chinese kui does not mean "walrus" (海象; hǎixiàng; 'sea elephant'), and this ghost first appeared in early Chinese-English dictionaries by Robert Henry Mathews and Herbert Giles. Mathews' Chinese-English Dictionary translates kui as "A one-legged monster; a walrus; Grave, respectful", which was adapted from A Chinese-English Dictionary "A one-legged creature; a walrus. Grave; reverential". Giles's dictionary copied this "walrus" mistake from his translation of the Zhuangzi (see below), "The walrus said to the centipede, 'I hop about on one leg, but not very successfully. How do you manage all these legs you have?'" He footnotes, "'Walrus' is of course an analogue. But for the one leg, the description given by a commentator of the creature mentioned in the text applies with significant exactitude."

Oracle script for kui (夔; "a demon")

Seal script for kui (夔; "a demon")

Oracle script for nao (夒; "a monkey")

Seal script for nao (夒; "a monkey")

=== Characters ===
The modern 21-stroke Chinese character 夔 for kui combines five elements: shǒu (首; "head"), zhǐ (止; "stop"), sì (巳; "6th (of 12 Earthly Branches)"), bā (八; "8"), and zhǐ (夂; "walk slowly"). These enigmatic elements were graphically simplified from the ancient Oracle bone script and Seal script pictographs for kui (夔) showing "a face of demon, two arms, a belly, a tail, and two feet".

Excepting the top 丷 element (interpreted as "horns" on the 頁; xié; "head"), kuí (夔) is graphically identical with náo (夒) – an old variant for náo (猱; "macaque; rhesus monkey"). The Oracle and Seal script graphs for nao pictured a monkey, and some Oracle graphs are interpreted as either kuí (夔) or náo (夒).

The (121 CE) Shuowen Jiezi, which was the first Chinese dictionary of characters, defines náo (夒) and kuí (夔).

- Nao: "a greedy quadruped, generally stated to be a she-monkey resembling a man; it contains the component head 頁, with 巳, 止, and 夊 representing respectively the arms and the leg of the beast." 夒: 貪獸也一曰母猴似人 从頁巳止夊其手足。
- Kui: "a [spirit] hü [魖 "a destructive, evil spectre"] resembling a dragon with one leg represented by the component 夊, and that the character represents the beast with horns, hands, and a human face." 夔: 神魖也如龍一足 从夊象有角手人面之形。

Kui, concludes Groot, "were thought to be a class of one-legged beasts or dragons with human countenances."

Most Chinese characters are composed of "radicals" or "significs" that suggest semantic fields and "phonetic" elements that roughly suggest pronunciation. Both these 夔 and 夒 characters are classified under their bottom 夂 "walk slowly radical", and Carr notes the semantic similarity with Kui being "one-legged". Only a few uncommon characters have kui (夔) phonetics. For instance, kui (犪, (with the "ox radical" 牛)) in kuiniu (犪牛; "wild ox; wild yak"), and kui (躨 (with the "foot radical" 足)) in kuiluo (躨跜; "writhe like a dragon").

=== Etymologies ===
The etymology of kui (夔) relates with wei (犩; "yak; buffalo"). Eberhard suggested Kui "mountain spirits that looked like a drum and had only one leg" was "without doubt phonetically related" to the variant name hui (暉); both were classified as shanxiao (山魈; "mountain demons") ("mandrill" in modern Chinese). He concludes there were two series of names for "one-legged mountain imps", xiao or chao in the southeastern languages of Yue and Yao, and kui or hui "from a more western language".

Schuessler connects the etymologies of the word wei (犩; "wild buffalo") < Late Han ŋuɨ and the ancient word kui (夔 or 犪) "a large mythical animal of various descriptions … with one foot … as strong as an ox … a large buffalo" < Late Han guɨ < Old Chinese *grui or *gwrə. The Chinese mythical kui (夔) originated as a loanword from a Kam–Tai source (cf. Proto-Tai *γwai 'buffalo' and Sui kwi < gwi 'buffalo'), comparable with Proto-Austronesian *kəbaw (cf. Tagalog kalabao, Malay kĕrbao, and Fiji karavau). Chinese wei (犩; "wild buffalo") derives from "ultimately the same etymon as kui", but the source might have been a Tibeto-Burman language, compare Proto-Tibeto-Burman *Iwaay 'buffalo', Jinghpaw ʼu-loi or ŋa-loi (ŋa 'bovine'), and Burmese: ကျွဲ kywai < klway.

== Classical usages ==
Kui frequently occurs in Chinese classic texts. Although some early texts are heterogeneous compositions of uncertain dates, the following discussion is presented in roughly chronological order.

Early authors agreed that the mountain dragon-demon Kui had yizu (一足; "one foot") but disagreed whether this also applied to Shun's music master Kui. Since the Chinese word zu (足) ambiguously means "foot; leg" or "enough; sufficient; fully; as much as", yizu can mean "one foot; one leg" or "one is enough". "The Confucianists," explains Eberhard, "who personified K'ui and made him into a 'master of music', detested the idea that K'ui had only one leg and they discussed it 'away'" (e.g., Hanfeizi, Lüshi Chunqiu, and Xunzi below). Instead of straightforwardly reading Kui yi zu (夔一足) as "Kui [had] one foot", Confucianist revisionism construes it as "Kui, one [person like him] was enough." There is further uncertainty whether the mythical Kui was "one footed" or "one legged". Compare the English "one-footed" words uniped "a creature having only one foot (or leg)" and monopod "a creature having only one foot (or leg); a one-legged stand".

=== Shujing ===
The Shujing uses kui (夔) in three chapters; Current Text chapters mention Shun's legendary Music Minister named Kui, and Old Text "Old Text" chapter has kuikui "grave; dignified". (New or Current Text and Old Text refer to different collections of Shangshu material with the Current Text being collected before the Old Text version. There is a long history of debate about the relative authenticity of the Old Text version as well as the dating of the constituent texts in both the Current and Old Text versions; see the article on the Shujing for more information.)

First, the "Canon of Shun" says the prehistoric ruler Shun appointed Kui as Music Minister and Long (龍; "Dragon") as Communication Minister.

The Di [Emperor Shun] said, 'Kui, I appoint you to be Director of Music, and to teach our sons, so that the straightforward shall yet be mild; the gentle, dignified: the strong, not tyrannical: and the impetuous, not arrogant. Poetry is the expression of earnest thought; singing is the prolonged utterance of that expression; the notes accompany that utterance, and they are harmonized themselves by the standard tubes. (In this way) the eight different kinds of musical instruments can be adjusted so that one shall not take from or interfere with another; and spirits and men are brought into harmony.' Kui said, 'I smite the (sounding-) stone, I gently strike it, and the various animals lead on one another to dance.'

Second, "Yi and Ji" elaborates the first account.

Kui said, 'When the sounding-stone is tapped or struck with force, and the lutes are strongly swept or gently touched, to accompany the singing, the progenitors (of the Di) come (to the service), the guest of Yu is in his place, and all the princes show their virtue in giving place to one another. (In the court) below (the hall) there are the flutes and hand-drums, which join in at the sound of the rattle, and cease at that of the stopper, when the organ and bells take their place. (This makes) birds and beasts fall moving. When the nine parts of the service, as arranged by the Di, have all been performed, the male and female phœnix come with their measured gambolings (into the court).' Kui said, 'Oh! when I smite the (sounding-) stone, or gently strike it, the various animals lead on one another to dance, and all the chiefs of the official departments become truly harmonious.'

Third, "The Counsels of the Great Yu" uses kuikui (夔夔; "grave; dignified; awestruck") to praise Shun's filial piety for his father Gusou; "with respectful service he appeared before Gu-sou, looking grave and awe-struck, till Gu also became transformed by his example. Entire sincerity moves spiritual beings."

=== Chunqiu and Zuozhuan ===
The (c. 6th–5th centuries BCE) Chunqiu and (early 4th century BCE) Zuozhuan use Kui as the name of a feudal state and of the legendary Music Master.

The Chunqiu history records that in 634 BCE the army of Chu destroyed Kui (夔); "In autumn, an officer of Ts'oo extinguished K'wei, and carried the viscount of K'wei back with them." Zuo's commentary notes the viscount of Kui, also written Kui (隗), was spared because the ruling families of both Chu and Kui had the same surname (see Guoyu below).

The Zuozhuan for 514 BCE provides details about Kui's raven-haired wife Xuanqi (玄妻; "Dark Consort") and their swinish son Bifeng (伯封).

In ancient times the prince of Jing had a daughter, with splendid black hair and very beautiful, so that her brightness cast a light around her, and she was named 'the dark Lady'. The prince K'wei [Shun's] minister of Music, married her, and she bore to him Pih-fung, who in truth had the heart of a pig, insatiably covetous and gluttonous, quarrelsome and perverse without measure, so that men called him 'the great Pig'.

=== Guoyu ===
The (c. 5th–4th centuries BCE) Guoyu uses kui (夔) as a surname and a demon name. The "Discourses of Zheng" (鄭語) discusses the origins of Chinese surnames and notes that Kui was the tribal ancestor of the Mi (羋; "ram horns") clan. Since Kui was a legendary descendant of the fire god Zhurong (祝融) and a member of the Mi clan, Eberhard explains, he was a relative to the ruling clans of Chu and Yue.

The "Discourses of Lu" records Confucius explaining three categories of guai (怪; "strange being; monster; demon; evil spirit"), including the Kui who supposedly resides in the 木石; "trees and rocks".

Ki Hwan-tszĕ, a grandee of the state of Lu, caused a well to be dug, when they fetched up something like an earthen pot with a goat in it. He had Chung-ni (Confucius) interrogated about it, in these words: "I dug a well, and got a dog; tell me what this is." On which the Sage answered: "According to what I have learned, it must be a goat; for I have heard that apparitions between trees and rocks are called khwei and wang-liang, while those in the water are lung or dragons, and wang-siang, and those in the ground are called fen-yang.

De Groot says later scholars accepted this "division of spectres into those living in mountains and forests, in the water, and in the ground", which is evidently "a folk-conception older, perhaps much older, than the time of Confucius." For instance, Wei Zhao's (3rd century CE) commentary on the Guoyu:

Some say that the khwei have one leg. The people of Yueh (Chehkiang and northern Fuhkien) style them 繅 (sao) of the hills, which character occurs also in the form 獟 (siao). They exist in Fu-yang (about the present Hang-cheu), have a human countenance and an ape-like body, and can speak. Some say that the one-legged wang-liang are spirits (tsing) of the hills, who by imitating human voices bewilder people.

=== Xunzi ===
The (early 3rd century BCE) Confucianist Xunzi mentions Kui twice. "Dispelling Obsession" says, "Many men have loved music, but Kui alone is honored by later ages as its master, because he concentrated upon it. Many men have loved righteousness, but Shun alone is honored by later ages as its master, because he concentrated upon it." Another chapter says when Kui rectified music, the wild birds and animals submitted.

=== Hanfeizi ===
The (c. 3rd century BCE) Hanfeizi gives two versions of Duke Ai 哀公 of Lu (r. 494–468 BCE) asking Confucius whether Kui had one leg.

The ruler Ngai of Lu asked Confucius, saying: "I have heard that there has lived in ancient times a certain Khwei with one leg; may we really believe in his one-leggedness?" Confucius answered: "No; he was no monopod; he was a choleric, perverse, ill-natured man, who raised much discontent; but he escaped being by reason of this killed by the hand of man on account of his trustworthiness, for everybody said: 'This is the only man of one piece and complete'. Thus Khwei was not one-legged, but he was a man of a piece and complete." The ruler Ngai now said: "Thus the fact is, that he was solid and complete".

According to another reading, the ruler Ngai asked Confucius, saying: "I have heard that Khwei had one leg; does this deserve belief?" The answer was: "Khwei was a man; why should he have had no more than one leg? He had no other peculiarity but that he was versed in music". Yao said: "Khwei is of a piece and complete!" and he made him his Director of Music, and therefore princely men have described him as a man of a piece and complete, but not with one leg.

=== Lüshi Chunqiu ===
The (c. 239 BCE) Lüshi Chunqiu uses kui (夔) several times. "Scrutinizing Hearsay" records another version of Duke Ai asking Confucius about Kui's alleged one-footedness, and it states that Kui came from the caomang (草莽; "thick underbrush; wilderness; wild jungle").

As a general principle, every statement that one hears must be maturely assessed. When they have to do with human affairs, they must be tested against reason.

Duke Ai of Lu asked Confucius, "The rectifier of music, Kui, is said to have had one foot. Is that true?"

Confucius answered, "Long ago, Shun wanted to use music to transmit his teachings to the whole world, so he ordered Zhong Li to select Kui from among the 'jungle' people and promote him. Shun made him rectifier of music. Kui thereupon rectified the six pitch-standards and tuned harmoniously the five tones, circulating the winds of the eight directions and thus caused the whole world to submit generally to Shun's rule. Zhong Li wanted to find more men like Kui, but Shun said, 'Music is the vital essence of Heaven and Earth and the key to success and failure. Hence, only the sage is capable of creating harmony. Harmony is the root of all music. Kui is capable of making music harmonious and thereby of making the whole world peaceful. There is only one like Kui, and that is enough. Therefore, the statement traditionally taken to mean 'Kui has one foot,' really means 'with Kui, one is enough' [enough and foot being written the same way]."

One or two of "The Almanacs" in Lüshi Chunqiu mention kui. "On the Proper Kind of Dyeing" mentions a teacher named Meng Sukui 孟蘇夔: "It is not only the state that is subject to influences, for scholar-knights as well are subject to influences. Confucius studied under Lao Dan, Meng Sukui, and Jingshu." "Music of the Ancients" has two passages with 質; zhì; "matter; substance" that commentators read as Kui (夔).

When the Sovereign Yao ascended the throne he commanded Kui to create musical performances. Kui thereupon made songs in imitation of the sounds of the forests and valleys, he covered earthenware tubs with fresh hides and beat on them, and he slapped stones and hit rocks to imitate the sounds of the jade stone chimes of the Supreme Sovereign, with which he made the hundred wild beasts dance. … [After Shun ascended] The Sovereign Shun than ordered Kui to perform "Nine Summonings," "Six Orderings," and "Six Flowers," through which he illuminated the Power of the Sovereign.

Note that the Lüshi Chunqiu says Kui was music master for both Yao and Shun, instead of only Shun.

=== Zhuangzi ===
The (c. 3rd–2nd centuries BCE) Daoist Zhuangzi mentions Kui in two chapters. "Autumn Floods" describes Kui as a one-legged creature.

The K'uei envies the millipede, the millipede envies the snake, the snake envies the wind, the wind envies the eye, and the eye envies the mind. The K'uei said to the millipede, "I have this one leg that I hop along on, though I make little progress. Now how in the world do you manage to work all those ten thousand legs of yours?" The millipede said, "You don't understand. Haven't you ever watched a man spit? He just gives a hawk and out it comes, some drops as big as pearls, some as fine as mist, raining down in a jumble of countless particles. Now all I do is put in motion the heavenly mechanism in me ‑ I'm not aware of how the thing works."

Burton Watson glosses Kui as "A being with only one leg. Sometimes it is described as a spirit or a strange beast, sometimes as a historical personage – the Music Master K'uei."

"Mastering Life" describes Kui as a hill demon in a story about Duke Huan of Qi (r. 685–643 BCE) seeing a ghost and becoming ill.

Duke Huan said, "But do ghosts really exist?" "Indeed they do. There is the Li on the hearth and the Chi in the stove. The heap of clutter and trash just inside the gate is where the Lei‑t'ing lives. In the northeast corner the Pei‑a and Kuei‑lung leap about, and the northwest corner is where the I‑yang lives. In the water is the Kang‑hsiang; on the hills, the Hsin; in the mountains, the K'uei; in the meadows, the P’ang‑huang; and in the marshes, the Wei‑t'o."

=== Shanhaijing ===
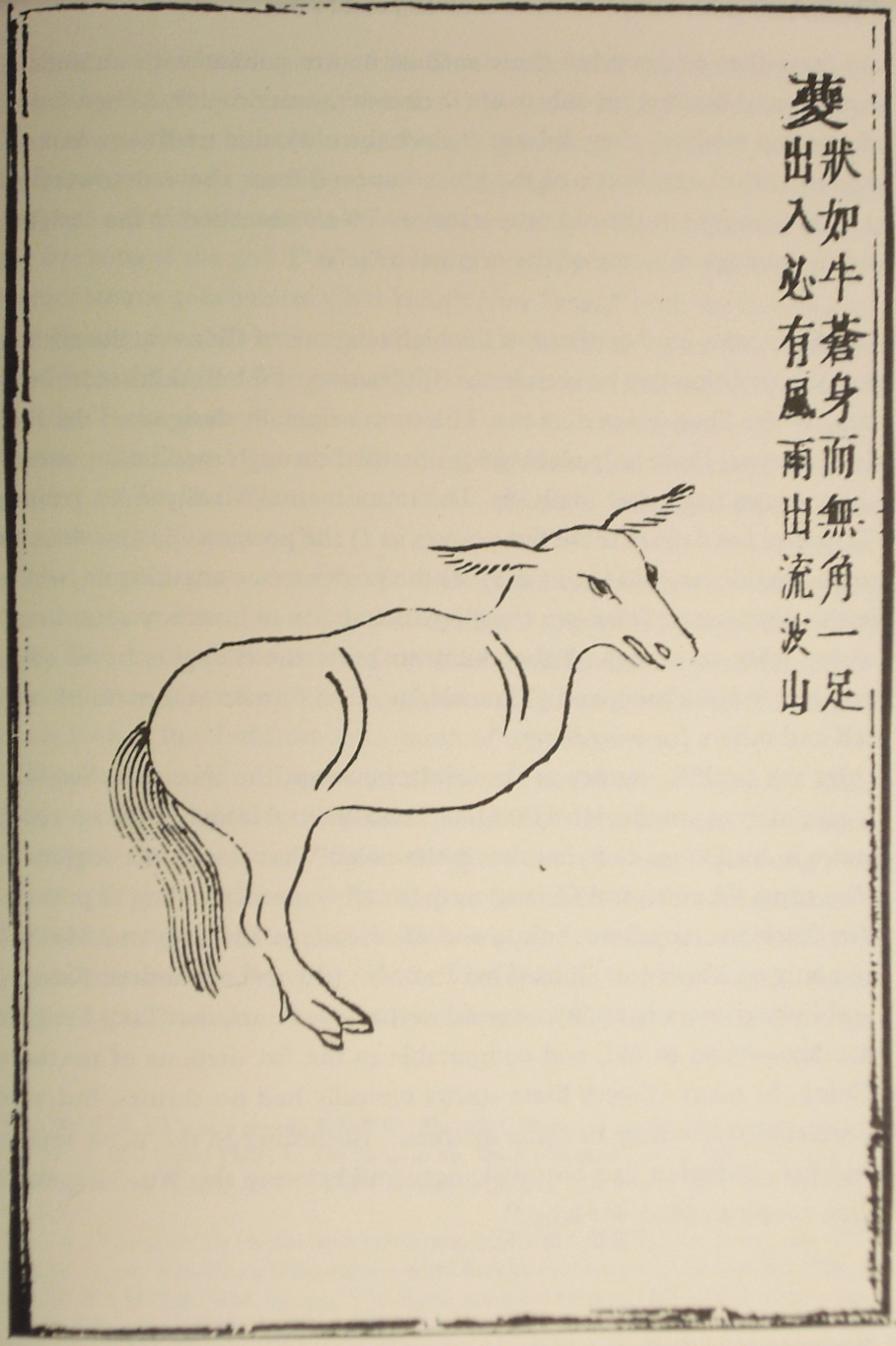
Kui from a 1786 edition of shanhaijing

The (c. 3rd century BCE – 1st century CE) Shanhaijing mentions both Kui (夔; "a one-legged god of thunder and rain") and kuiniu (夔牛; "a wild yak").

The 14th chapter of the Shanhaijing, known as "The Classic of the Great Wilderness: The East" (大荒東經), (Note: The original text in 山海經: 大荒東經: "東海中有流波山，入海七千里。其上有獸，狀如牛，蒼身而無角，一足，出入水則必風雨，其光如日月，其聲如雷，其名曰夔。黃帝得之，以其皮為鼓，橛以雷獸之骨，聲聞五百里，以威天下。" Tr. in Birrell 2000, p. 162.) describes the mythical Kui "Awestruck", and says the Yellow Emperor made a drum from its hide and a drumstick from a bone of Leishen (雷神; "Thunder God") (cf. Japanese Raijin).

In the East Sea there is Mount Flowwave, 7000 leagues onto the sea. On its summit there is an animal. Its shape is like that of an ox, it has a bright blue body, and it has no horns, and only one foot. When it comes out of the water and goes back in, there is wind and it rains, and its glare is like that of the sun and the moon, it makes a sound like thunder. Its name is Awestruck. The Yellow Emperor captured Awestruck and made a drum out of its hide. He used a bone from the Thunder beast to hit it with. The sound of the drumming was heard for 500 leagues, and so it made all beneath heaven full of dread.

Groot infers that the in "one-legged dragon" Kui, which was "fancied to be amphibious, and to cause wind and rain", "we immediately recognize the lung or Dragon, China’s god of Water and Rain". Carr interprets this 蒼; cang; "dark green; blue" color "as a crocodile-dragon (e.g., Jiaolong) with its tail seen as 'one leg'", and cites Marcel Granet that the Kui's resemblance to a drum "is owing to drumming in music and dancing".

The account of Minshan Mountain (岷山, 崌山) in the 5th chapter of the Shanhaijing, the "Classic of the Central Mountains" (Note: The 中次九經 section in the 5th Chapter (中山經) of the Shanhaijing. Tr. in Birrell 2000, pp. 88–9.) describes kuiniu "huge buffalo" living on two mountains near the source of the Yangtze River 長江 (lit. "long river").

Three hundred leagues further northeast is the mountain called Mount Gem. The Long River rises here and flows northeast to empty into the sea. Excellent turtles are plentiful in the Long River, and there are many alligators. Gold and jade are abundant on the summit, and on the lower slopes are quantities of white jade. The trees on the mountain are mostly plum and pear. Its animals are mostly rhinoceros, elephant, and the huge buffalo.

A hundred and fifty leagues further east is a mountain called Mount Lair. The Long River rises here and flows east to empty into the Great Long River. The Long River contains numerous strange snakes and many force-fish. The trees on this mountain are mostly hardwood oak and holmoak, and there are many plum and catalpa trees. Its animals are mostly the huge buffalo, antelope, hoofed hare, and rhinoceros.

The Shanhaijing commentary of Guo Pu describes kuiniu (夔牛) as a large yak found in Shu (present-day Sichuan).

=== Liji ===
The (c. 2nd–1st century BCE) Liji mentions the music master Kui in two chapters. The "Record of Music" explains. "Anciently, Shun made the lute with five strings, and used it in singing the Nan Fang. Khwei was the first who composed (the pieces of) music to be employed by the feudal lords as an expression of (the royal) approbation of them." The "Confucius at Home at Ease" has Zi-gong ask whether Kui mastered li (禮; "ceremony; ritual; rites").

Ze-kung crossed over the mat and replied, 'Allow me to ask whether even Khwei was ignorant (of the ceremonial usages)?' The Master said, 'Was he not one of the ancients? Yes, he was one of them. To be versed in music, we call being poorly furnished. To be versed in the usages and not versed in music, we call being one-sided. Now Khwei was noted for his acquaintance with music, and not for his acquaintance with ceremonies, and therefore his name has been transmitted with that account of him (which your question implies). But he was one of the men of antiquity'.

=== Baopuzi ===
Ge Hong's (320 CE) Daoist Baopuzi (抱樸子) mentions kui (夔) in an "Inner Chapter" and an "Outer Chapter". "Into Mountains: Over Streams" warns about several demons found in hills and mountains, including Kui (夔) with the variant name hui (暉; 'light', 'brightness') (or 揮; hui; 'shake', 'wave in some texts'), "There is another mountain power, this one in the shape of a drum, colored red, and also with only one foot. Its name is Hui." "Breadth of Learning" mentions two music masters, Kui (夔) and Xiang (襄) (from Qin), "Those who play the lute are many, but it is difficult to match the master of sounds of K'uei and Hsiang."

== Mythic parallels ==
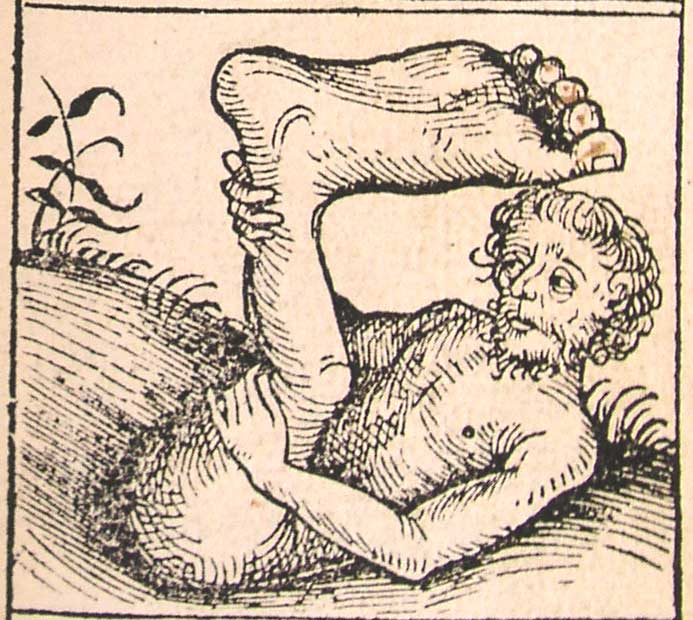
Monocoli illustration from the 1493 CE Nuremberg Chronicle

In addition to the Kui (夔), Chinese mythology has other uniped creatures. Based on "one-legged" descriptions, Carr compares kui with chi (螭; "hornless dragon; mountain demon") and hui (虺; "snake; python"). The Shanhaijing mentions three one-footed creatures. The "Bellow-pot" bird "which looks like an owl; it has a human face but only one foot"; the "Endsquare" bird "which looks like a crane; it has one foot, scarlet markings on a green background, and a white beak"; and

Softsharp Country lies east of the Country of Oneeye. Its people have only one hand and only one foot. Their knees turn backwards so that their foot sticks up in the air. One author states that this is Keepsharp Country, and that the single foot of the people there turns backwards because it is broken.

Two other personages named Kui in Chinese folklore are Kui Xing (魁星; "the dwarfish god of examinations") and Zhong Kui (鍾馗; "the vanquisher of ghosts and demons").

One-footed or one-legged Kui has further parallels in comparative mythology. For instance:

- Empusa "one-footed", a demigoddess in Greek mythology
- Monocoli "one foot" or Sciapod "shadow foot", a fabled race of people with one large foot and one center leg in Greek mythology
- Ippon-datara 一本踏鞴 "one foot-bellows", a one-legged mountain spirit in Japanese mythology (cf. Nūbē Characters)
- Patasola "one foot", a vampire-like humanoid in Colombian folklore
- Saci, a one-legged nature-spirit in Brazilian folklore
