= History of Fenn College =

Fenn College
- Former name: Cleveland YMCA School of Technology
- Type: Private College
- Established: 1923
- President: G. Brooks Earnest (final)
- Students: 1,674 (Fall quarter 1964, day division)
- Location: Cleveland, Ohio, USA
- Campus: Urban
- Colors: Red and White
- Nickname: Foxes
- Website: www.clevelandmemory.org/fenn/index.html

The history of Fenn College tells the story of Fenn College from its founding until the present.

== 1870s-1950s ==
- 1870: Cleveland YMCA offered free classes.
- 1881: YMCA program formalized.
- 1906: Reorganized as the Association Institute.
- 1921: Renamed Cleveland YMCA School of Technology, or Y-Tech for short.
- 1923: Y-Tech first offers courses toward a bachelor's degree. This is now the claimed founding date of Fenn College; it was originally claimed as 1881.
- 1929: Renamed Fenn College after Sereno Peck Fenn. Fenn College took over several buildings in the area including Fenn Tower, Stilwell Hall, and Foster Hall.

In 1930, Nash Junior College was created. In 1932, Nash became Fenn's school of arts & sciences, joining the original engineering and business schools.

== Origins of Fenn College ==
The origins of Fenn College date from 1870 when Cleveland YMCA created an Educational Committee to provide free evening classes in French and German for the benefit of young men coming to YMCA. After offering other courses sporadically throughout the 1870s, YMCA moved to establish a formal evening educational in the 1880s. In 1906 YMCA combined its evening school with a newly created day school under the name of the Association Institute. By 1909 YMCA was operating four different day schools: The School of Commerce and Finance, The Technical School, The Preparatory School, and the Special School (dropped in 1913). The schools admitted their first female students in 1918. In 1921 YMCA's educational branch was designated Cleveland YMCA School of Technology (Y-Tech).

== Fenn College Post WWI ==
Finding a demand following the First World War YMCA first began offering college credit courses in engineering and business in 1923. These early classes were conducted at Central YMCA building on Prospect Avenue andEast 22nd Street and in three converted residences on Prospect east of the Central YMCA: the Johnson Building; the Edwards Building, and the Medical Building. Two significant events marked 1927. Y-Tech's first college class graduated, and planning began for a junior college program that would become Nash Junior College in 1931. In 1928 the first building built exclusively for the college, the laboratory and classroom Fenn Building, was constructed adjacent to Central YMCA, behind the Johnson Building. The need to achieve accreditation for its academic programs prompted the YMCA in 1929 to re-organize again its education program. On January 1, 1930 Y-Tech took the name Fenn College in honor of Sereno Peck Fenn, who had served on the YMCA board of directors and as YMCA's president for 25 years. College lore holds that among the reasons for the name change was that the school's graduates felt the name, YMCA, put them at a disadvantage in competing against graduates from other colleges in the job market. In 1935 YMCA Preparatory School and the Nash Junior College ceased operations and a School of Arts and Science was added to the Engineering and Business Administration schools.

== Fenn College Expands ==
Dr. Cecil Vincent Thomas, who served simultaneously as YMCA's Executive Director and as Fenn's first President, 1923–1947, guided Fenn's early development. With several notable private colleges already established in the Cleveland area, including Case Institute of Technology and Western Reserve University, Fenn College sought to attract those students for whom college otherwise would have been financially unattainable by offering a low-cost quality education. In line with this Fenn in 1923 became the fourth college in Ohio to adopt the cooperative education program. This program of alternating periods of classroom work with on-the-job work experience was required for all day students and was optional for evening division students. In need of additional classroom and laboratory space Fenn College purchased the National Town and Country Club building at East 24th Street and Euclid Avenue Street in 1937, becoming only the third college in America to have a skyscraper on campus. Dedicated as Fenn Tower in 1938, the new building provided much needed classroom and office space. Additionally it gave Fenn amore prestigious "Euclid Avenue" address. Fenn's reputation was further enhanced when it received accreditation from the North Central Association in 1940. During the administration of Dr. Edward Hodnett, 1948–1951, Fenn constructedFoster Hall, an engineering classroom and laboratory building funded by a donation from Cleveland entrepreneur Claude Foster in 1949, and at the recommendation of the North Central Association, separated its operations from those of YMCA in 1950. Dr. G. Brooks Earnest served as Fenn's President from 1951 until the State of Ohio's takeover of the College in 1965. Under Dr. Earnest Fenn expanded again purchasing the three-story Ohio Motors building on East 24th Street in 1953. Renovated for classroom and laboratory work the building opened in 1958 and was dedicated in January 1959 as Stilwell Hall in honor of Board of Trustees Chairman Charles Stilwell.

== Fenn College Becomes CSU ==
Throughout its history Fenn College had always managed to operate without incurring a budget deficit. However, by 1963 the College administration was confronted with mounting financial difficulties due to rising operating costs, direct competition from a new community college, and persistent rumors of a possible state takeover. That year the College issued The Fenn Plan for Unified Higher Education in Cleveland-Northeastern Ohio calling upon the State of Ohio to develop a state university in Cleveland using Fenn College as its nucleus. During the 1962 Ohio gubernatorial campaign, candidate James Rhodes had proposed that there should be a state university within a 30-mile radius of every citizen. At that time, the nearest state university to Cleveland was Kent State University in Kent, Ohio. On 18 December 1964, Governor Rhodes signed Ohio General Assembly Amended House Bill No. 2 creating Ohio's seventh state university, Cleveland State University, and announced the appointment of a board of trustees. On March 10, 1965, the Fenn College and CSU Trustees reached an agreement incorporating Fenn as the nucleus of the new university on September 1, 1965.

== 1960s ==
On December 18, 1964, the state of Ohio founded The Cleveland State University. On July 28, 1965; Fenn College's board of trustees agreed to transfer Fenn's property, buildings and student body to the new state institution, effective August 1. Fenn had been struggling to survive for some time, and school officials ultimately concluded that it could not stay independent. In 1965 Fenn College had 6,000 alumni, Cleveland State accepted them as alumni of Cleveland State. On September 14, 1965, the board of trustees of Fenn College amended the articles of incorporation to serve as the amended articles of the Fenn Educational Foundation. The legal entity of Fenn College became the Fenn Educational Foundation. As a result of the Tax Reform Act of 1969, which would disadvantage a private foundation more than a public one, it was decided to join The Cleveland Foundation, a public foundation. At the end of the day on October 6, 1971, the Fenn Educational Foundation became the Fenn Educational Fund, which is a part of The Cleveland Foundation.

== Athletics ==
Fenn College Foxes logo (1950s–1965)

The school nickname was the Foxes. Homer E. Woodling was Fenn College's only athletic director, serving from 1929 until 1965 when Fenn College became Cleveland State. Fenn College sponsored the following sports;

Sport	Years
Baseball	(1931–32)–(1934–35) (1946–47)–(1964–65)
Men's basketball	(1929–30)–(1942–43) (1945–46)–(1964–65)
Men's fencing	(1931–32)–(1932–33) (1934–35) (1948–49)–(1950–51) (1952–53)–(1964–65)
Men's golf	(1946–47)–(1964–65)
Men's ice hockey	(1937–38)–(1940–41)
Rifle	(1929–30)–(1937–38)
Men's soccer	(1954–55)–(1964–65)
Men's swimming & Diving	(1931–32)–(1942–43) (1946–47)–(1964–65)
Men's tennis	(1931–32)–(1933–34) (1939–40)–(1941–42) (1946–47)–(1964–65)
Men's track & field	(1933–34)–(1941–42) (1945–46)–(1955–56)
Men's wrestling	(1931–32)–(1933–34) (1962–63)–(1964–65)

== Presidents ==
Presidents
Person	Years	Person	Years
Dr. Cecil V. Thomas President	1934–1947	Dr. Edward Hodnett President	1948–1951
Dr. Joseph C. Nichols President	1947–1948	Dr. G. Brooks Earnest President	1952–1965
