= Henry Courtenay =

Henry Courtenay is the name of:

- Henry Courtenay, 1st Marquess of Exeter (c. 1490–1538)
- Henry Courtenay Fenn (1894–1978), American sinologist
- Reginald Courtenay (bishop of Exeter) (Henry Reginald Courtenay, 1741–1803), English bishop of Bristol and bishop of Exeter
- Henry Reginald Courtenay (MP) (1714–1763)

== See also ==
- Henry A. Courtney Jr. (1916–1945), U.S. marine
