= Mathews' Chinese–English Dictionary =

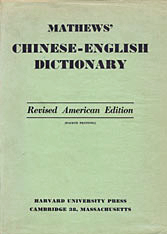
- Mathews' Chinese–English Dictionary book cover (1943)
- Author: Robert Henry Mathews
- Language: Chinese, English
- Publisher: China Inland Mission Press
- Publication date: 1931, 1943
- Publication place: China
- Media type: print
- Pages: xxiv, 1226
- OCLC: 825731138
- Website: https://pdfcoffee.com/mathewsx27-chinese-english-dictionary-revised-american-edition-pdf-free.html

A Chinese–English Dictionary: Compiled for the China Inland Mission by R. H. Mathews or Mathews' Chinese–English Dictionary, edited by the Australian Congregationalist missionary Robert Henry Mathews (1877–1970), was the standard Chinese–English dictionary for decades. Mathews originally intended his dictionary to be a revision of Frederick W. Baller's out-of-print An Analytical Chinese–English Dictionary, but ended up compiling a new dictionary. Mathews copied, without acknowledgment, from the two editions of Herbert Giles's A Chinese–English Dictionary.

The 1,250-page first edition contained 7,783 Chinese character head entries, alphabetically collated by romanized syllabic order in modified Wade–Giles system, and includes 104,000 words and phrases taken from the classics, general literature, and news media. Owing to a World War II shortage of Chinese–English dictionaries, Harvard University Press published a revised American edition, which included 15,000 corrections, revisions, and new examples.

== History ==
The CIM headquarters, Shanghai

After studying lithography at the Working Men's College of Melbourne, the Australian Robert Henry Mathews started a printing business, but in 1906 he abandoned it to become a Congregationalist missionary and join the China Inland Mission (CIM). Mathews first sailed to China in 1908, and the CIM assigned him to stations in Henan, Anhui, where he became interested in studying the regional varieties of Chinese, and Sichuan.

In 1928, Mathews was assigned to the China Inland Mission headquarters in Shanghai, where he could fully utilize his printing and Chinese linguistic skills. They commissioned him to revise two out-of-print China Inland Mission publications by Frederick W. Baller, the Analytical Chinese–English Dictionary and Mandarin Primer, both printed in 1900. Robert Mathews and his wife Violet worked intensively to complete the Chinese–English Dictionary in 1931, after only three years (he calls it a "rush job"), and then, for westerners seeking a "working knowledge" of Chinese, the 1938 Kuoyü Primer in seven years during the start of the Second Sino-Japanese War. In 1943, Japanese occupation troops interned Mathews, commandeered the CIM compound in Shanghai to use as their headquarters, and destroyed both the dictionary printing plates and Mathews' manuscripts and proofs for a revised edition.

The 1931 first edition, which began as a revision of Baller's Analytical Dictionary, ended up as "a 'new' dictionary". Robert Mathew's preface says that in the 30 years since Baller's outdated dictionary, the "influx of modern inventions and the advance of scientific knowledge" in China have introduced many neologisms. Consequently Mathews compiled a replacement dictionary, keeping in mind Baller's original objective, "to supply the demand for a dictionary at once portable and inexpensive and at the same time sufficiently large to meet the wants of an ordinary student." Mathews' Chinese title is Maishi Han-Ying da cidian 麥氏漢英大辭典 "Mai's Chinese–English dictionary".

Instead of adopting the usual Wade-Giles system for romanizing Chinese pronunciation, Baller created his own system, now referred to as Baller's system or the China Inland Mission system. Another shortcoming of Baller's dictionary was inconsistent treatment of Chinese varietal pronunciations, furnishing "the sounds of characters as given in West China" (Southwestern Mandarin and Chang-Du dialect) and ignoring the variety "spoken in the south-eastern.

After Japanese troops in Shanghai destroyed the Mathews' dictionary original printing plates, the lack of copies became an urgent matter for English-speaking Allies of World War II. The Harvard–Yenching Institute said the need for Chinese dictionaries in America had "grown from chronic to acute", and selected Mathews' lexicon as one of two "practical dictionaries" to revise and reprint for "the immediate demands of American students". Both photolithographic reproductions were retitled: Henry Courtenay Fenn's (1926) The Five Thousand Dictionary was Fenn's Pocket Dictionary (November 1942) and Mathews' A Chinese–English Dictionary… was Mathews' Chinese–English Dictionary (March 1943), which was a "pirated" edition since Mathews never received any payment. The revised edition made a total of 15,000 changes to the original, "errors have been corrected, pronunciations and definitions revised, and new entries inserted". In addition, the Chinese-American linguist Yuen Ren Chao wrote an Introduction on Pronunciation. The dictionary was reduced in size from 8x11 to 7x10 inches. In 1944, Harvard University Press also published Mathews' Chinese–English Dictionary Revised English Index. By 1984, the Press had sold more than 45,000 copies of Mathew's dictionary.

Up through the 1970s, English-speaking students of Chinese relied chiefly on Mathews' Chinese–English Dictionary. Scholars published several companion pieces for Mathews. Tse-tsung Chow (周策縱) of the University of Wisconsin compiled in 1972 A New Index to Mathews' Chinese–English Dictionary, Based on the "Chung" system for Arranging Chinese Characters, referring to the obsolescent zhōng 衷 indexing system based on character strokes. Olov Bertil Anderson of Lund University published in 1972 A companion volume to R. H. Mathews' Chinese–English dictionary, which went into a 335-page third revision in 1988. Harry M. Branch developed a Five Willows system and published in 1973 Mathews' and Fenn re-indexed. Raymond Huang wrote in 1981 a descriptive Mandarin Pronunciation Explained with Diagrams: A Companion to R. H. Mathews' Chinese–English Dictionary.

Mathews' Chinese–English dictionary has been reprinted time and again—but without his authorization—and became so prominent that it is often simply called Mathews. The English diplomat and sinologist Endymion Wilkinson says Mathews' continues in use, especially by students of Classical Chinese, but for other purposes it has been outdated by excellent dictionaries such as John DeFrancis' (1996) ABC Chinese–English Dictionary.

In the history of Chinese lexicography, Mathews' dictionary was the last major compilation in the tradition of Christian missionaries in China. It began with Robert Morrison's (1815-1823) A Dictionary of the Chinese Language, and continued with Walter Henry Medhurst's (1842) Chinese and English Dictionary and Samuel Wells Williams' (1874) A Syllabic Dictionary of the Chinese Language—excepting the anti-clericalist Herbert Giles' (1892, 1912) A Chinese–English Dictionary. Thus, Mathews' dictionary signifies the end of missionaries compiling Chinese bilingual dictionaries and the beginning of a new era for Chinese and English bilingual dictionaries, "based on stronger theoretical underpinnings and more sophisticated information technology as from the latter part of the twentieth century".

== Content ==
Mathews not only revised Baller's dictionary but augmented and innovated it as well. Baller included 6,089 character head entries (not including variant characters) and 40,000 word and phrase examples; Mathews increased the number of character entries to "7,785" (the last entry is number 7,783 yün 薀 "Hippuris or mare's tail.") and gave over 104,000 usage examples drawn from "the classics, general literature, magazines, newspapers, advertisements, legal documents, and many other sources", including technical terms "relating to motors, electricity, aviation, [and] wireless".

Mathews changed Baller's romanization system to Wade–Giles, and omitted Baller's explanations of Chinese character construction. For example, saying Number 5047, tao^{4} 道 "A road; a way; a path…" comes "From Nos. 1036; 4771", that is choh 辵 or 辶 "Walking. The 162nd Radical" and sheo 首 "The head. A chief; a leader; first. The 185th Radical."

Mathews's 1164-page dictionary is collated alphabetically according to the Wade–Giles system of romanization. It includes two appendices comprising 61 pages. Appendix A has tables including 29 Chinese dynasties, the celestial stems and earthly branches, Chinese calendar, and solar terms. Appendix B gives a list of the 214 Kangxi radicals, a radical-and-stroke index, and, for the dictionary's frustrated user, a helpful list of characters having obscure radicals.

Scholars agree that Mathews's dictionary closely resembles Herbert Giles's Chinese–English Dictionary, but differ over the degree of copying. Aylmer says many definitions "are taken, without acknowledgment" from Giles, Wilkinson says Mathews's is "based on" Giles's dictionary, and Kroll says Matthews's is "heavily indebted" to Giles's.

Mathews occasionally cites Giles's dictionary, such as for the Chinese exonym Xiáyōusī 黠憂斯 "Kyrgyz people".

- "HSIA 黠 Artful; wily. Clever; sharp. … 黠憂斯 The Kirghiz, lit red-yellow face; name given by the Ouigours, in allusion to the red hair, white complexions, and green eyes of the Kirghiz."
- "HSIA 黠 Crafty; artful. … [adding a meaning] Transliterating particle. 黠憂斯 ancient name for the Kirghiz:—lit. "red-yellow faces, in allusion to their red hair, white complexion and green eyes." Giles."

There are many cases where Mathews uses Giles's dictionary without citation, such as the Kuí 夔 "legendary dragon-like monster with one foot". The problem began with Giles's Zhuangzi translation, "The walrus said to the centipede …", which notes, "'Walrus' is of course an analogue. But for the one leg, the description given by a commentator of the creature mentioned in the text applies with significant exactitude." Giles's dictionary translates kui as "A one-legged creature; a walrus. Grave; reverential." Mathews's dictionary gives "A one-legged monster; a walrus; Grave, respectful".

As noted above, the 1943 second edition Mathews' Chinese–English Dictionary adds an introduction on Chinese pronunciation and over 15,000 editorial changes. Furthermore, it gives a 5-page List of Syllabic Headings for quick reference, since the original order of syllables "is not strictly alphabetic". Another feature of the new edition is indicating all cases of the unstressed neutral tone.

== Reception ==
Mathews' Chinese–English Dictionary has generally been well received but some authors have criticized lexicographical shortcomings. On one hand, Noel Stock, the University of Toledo scholar of Ezra Pound (who refers to Mathews in The Cantos "Rock-Drill" section), says Mathews's dictionary "is probably known by every westerner who undertakes Chinese, as well as by many Chinese themselves"; but on the other, the American scholar of Chinese literature David R. Knechtges says it "does not always give the correct or current pronunciation for many characters".

The Australian National University historian of China C. P. Fitzgerald says a user of Mathews's dictionary will be struck by "the deep scholarship, the care and the accuracy of the man who produced this monument of learning". Mathews has a "peculiar kind of immortality" among those who use his work, "one does not say Mathews' Chinese–English Dictionary but simply, 'I must look up that in Mathews'. Mathews, in fact, is a household word to the Sinologist, an indispensable adjunct to his work".

The University of California, Berkeley sinologist Edward H. Schafer made detailed criticisms of Mathews's dictionary. First, he used it to illustrate how an ideal dictionary of classical Chinese could "improve on vague, conventional equivalents given in most dictionaries"; while Mathews's gives ch'iung^{2} 瓊 "A red stone. Excellent; beautiful." (no. 1245), Schafer translates "rose-gem (cf. rhodonite; rose quartz); carbuncle (possibly an archaic word for "garnet" or "spinel"; overtones of classic, divine and fairy beauty." Second, Schafer wrote two supplements noting mistranslations and omissions in Mathews, for example, fang 舫 "A large boat. Two boats lashed together" (1814) is more accurately translated "rectangular, scowlike barge, usually with deckhouse".

The American sinologist Jerry Norman says that from a lexicographic point of view, "Mathews' dictionary was no advance over Giles'" and its only real advantage was that it was more compact and up-to-date with modern terminology. Otherwise, "it scrambled together without differentiation words from the earliest texts of Chinese literature with contemporary neologisms". However, the "most serious problem" was its treatment of pronunciation. As Yuen Ren Chao's introduction points out, Mathews's dictionary uses three systems of pronunciation, giving the example of HSÜAN for current Peking pronunciation in Wade–Giles, SÜAN and Gwoyeu Romatzyh ㄙㄩㄢ in the obsolete (1920) Guoyln zidian 國音字典 system, and Hsüen in the China Inland Mission system. The result of using three transcription systems, says Norman, is that although the entries are in alphabetic order, "it is often frustratingly difficult to find a particular entry unless one is familiar with these various systems of transcription".

The lexicographer Robert Dunn says that despite the fact that many of Mathews's dictionary entries are outdated or obsolete, some have changed meanings today, and numerous new and current Chinese terms are omitted, the reference work "will doubtless continue to be one of the most widely used by students of Chinese history, literature, thought, and civilization"..

Paul W. Kroll, Professor of Chinese at the University of Colorado, says the most troubling inadequacy of Mathews's dictionary is that "it indiscriminately mixes together vocabulary of all periods", from the ancient Book of Documents to early 20th-century merchant and missionary vocabulary, with the "unhappy result that students infer all terms and meanings to be equally applicable throughout three thousand years of Chinese history". Another problem is the seemingly random arrangement of various meanings for any particular word, leading the user to a "pick-and-choose approach".
