= A Chinese–English Dictionary =

Book by Herbert Giles

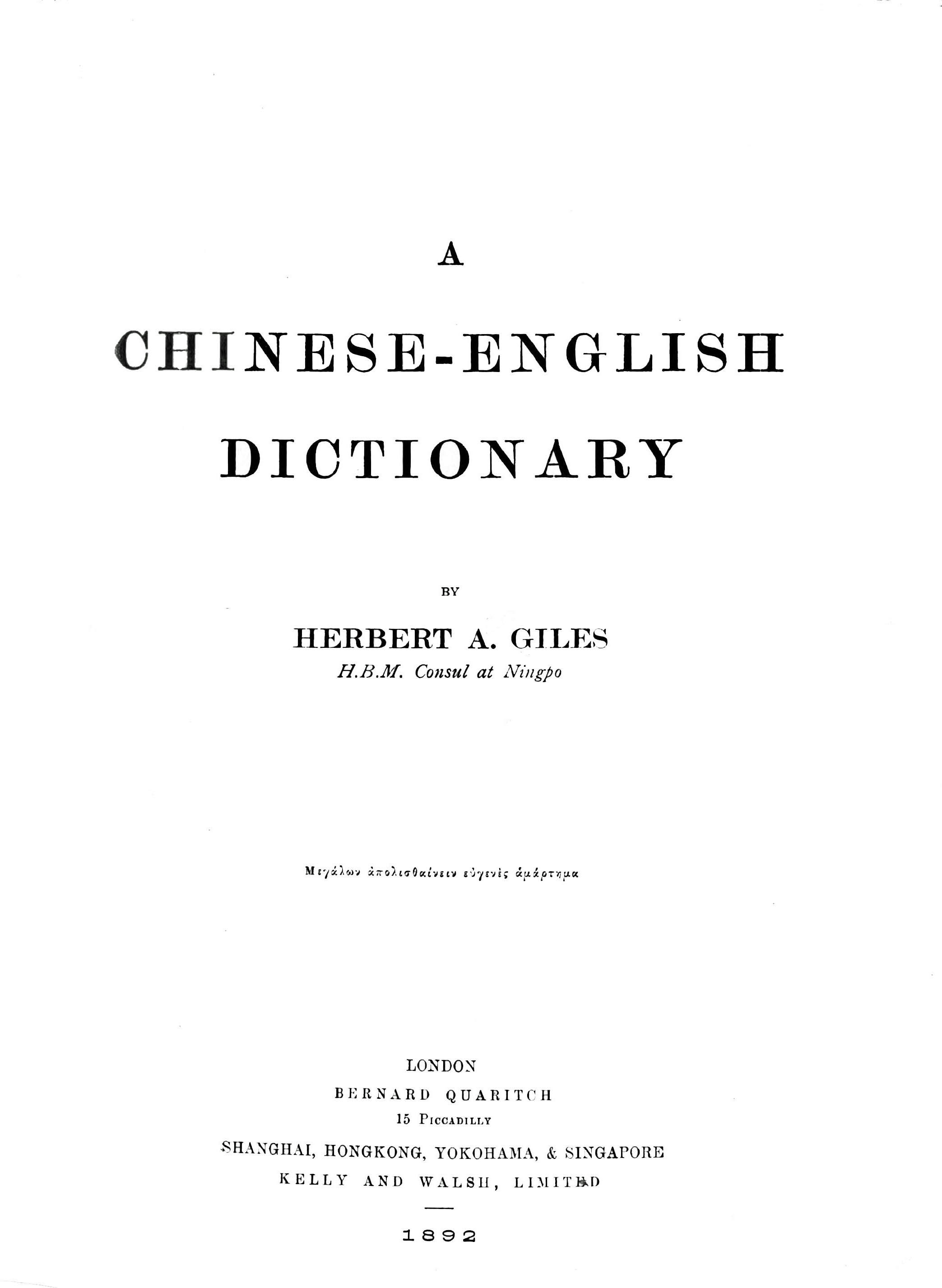
- Title page from Giles' A Chinese–English Dictionary (1892: i). The epigraph quotes Longinus, "Failure in a great attempt is at least a noble error".
- Author: Herbert Allen Giles
- Language: Chinese, English
- Publisher: Kelly and Walsh
- Publication date: 1892
- Publication place: China
- Media type: Print
- Pages: xlvi, 1415
- OCLC: 272554592
- Website: https://archive.org/details/gileschineseenglishdictionary

A Chinese–English Dictionary (1892), compiled by the British consular officer and sinologist Herbert Allen Giles (1845–1935), is the first Chinese–English encyclopedic dictionary. Giles started compilation after being rebuked for criticizing mistranslations in Samuel Wells Williams' (1874) A Syllabic Dictionary of the Chinese Language. The 1,461-page first edition contains 13,848 Chinese character head entries alphabetically collated by Beijing Mandarin pronunciation romanized in the Wade–Giles system, which Giles created as a modification of Thomas Wade's (1867) system. Giles' dictionary furthermore gives pronunciations from nine regional varieties of Chinese, and three Sino-Xenic languages Japanese, Korean, and Vietnamese. Giles revised his dictionary into the 1,813-page second edition (1912) with the addition of 67 entries and numerous usage examples.

== History ==
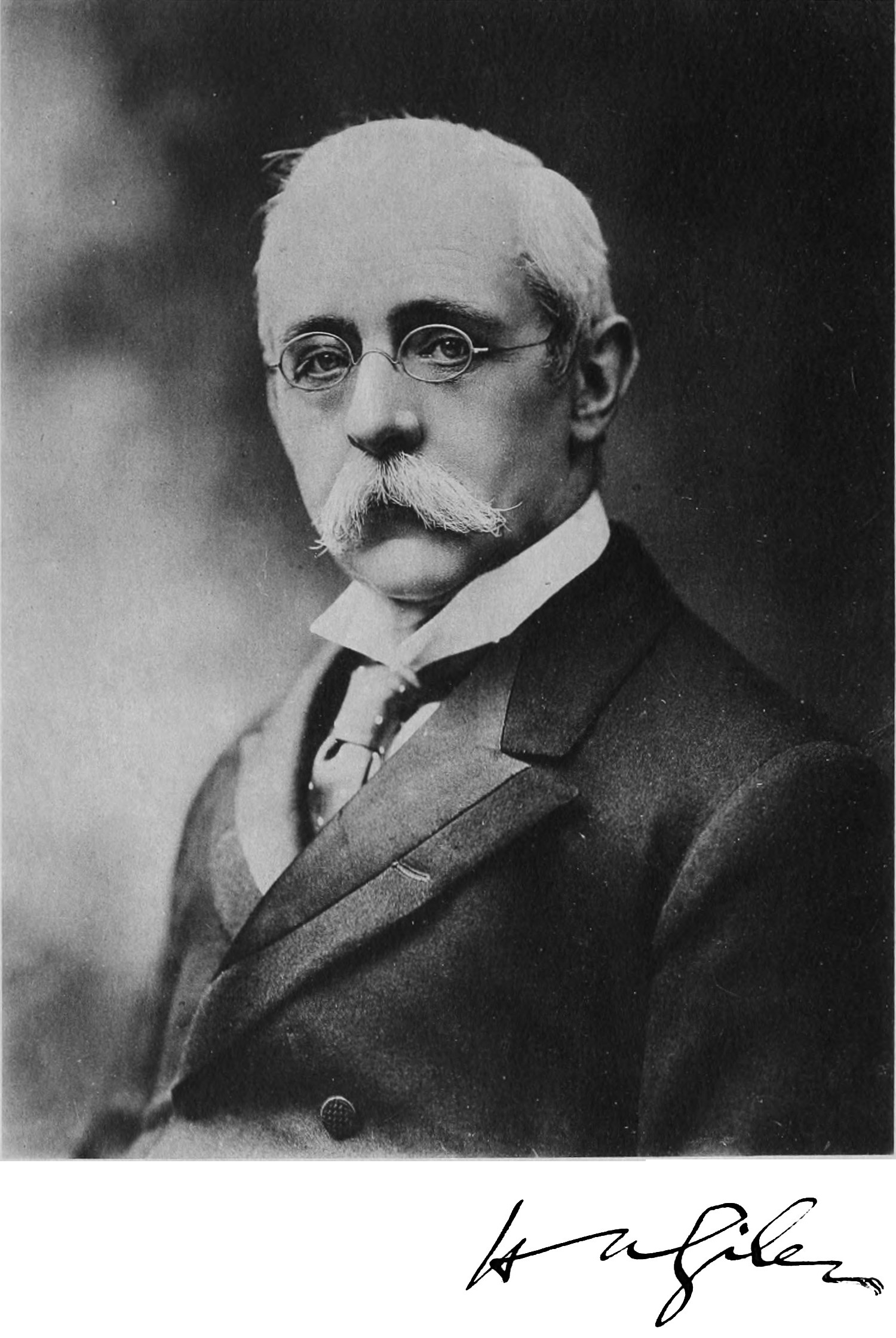
Photograph of Herbert Allen Giles

Herbert Giles served as a British consular officer in late Qing dynasty China until from 1867 to 1892. After his return to England, he was appointed the second professor of Chinese at the University of Cambridge, in succession to Thomas Francis Wade. They are renowned for developing what was later called the Wade–Giles romanization system of Chinese, which Giles' A Chinese–English Dictionary firmly established as the standard in the Western world until the 1958 official international pinyin system.

In 1867, Giles passed the competitive Foreign Office examination for a Student Interpretership in China, and began studying the Chinese language at Peking. He later criticized his first Chinese book, a Part II reprint of Robert Morrison's (1815–1823) A Dictionary of the Chinese Language, in Three Parts, because it failed to mark aspiration, "much as if an English–Chinese dictionary, for the use of the Chinese, were published without the letter h, showing no difference between the conjunction and and the [h]and of the body".

Herbert A. Giles wrote some 60 publications on Chinese culture and language (see Wikisource list), which may be divided into four broad categories: reference works, language textbooks, translations, and miscellaneous writings. His pioneering reference books established new standards of accuracy. Of all his publications, Giles was most proud of (1892, 1912) A Chinese–English Dictionary, and (1898) A Chinese Biographical Dictionary. Giles' textbooks for Chinese language learners include (1873) A Dictionary of Colloquial Idioms in the Mandarin Dialect and two Chinese phrasebooks transliterated phonetically according to the English alphabet, "so that anyone could pick up the book and read off a simple sentence with a good chance of being understood": the (1872) Chinese without a Teacher and (1877) Handbook of the Swatow Dialect: With a Vocabulary for Teochew dialect. His wide-ranging translations cover many genres of Chinese literature. Probably the best known are (1880, 1916) Strange Stories from a Chinese Studio, (1884, 1922) Gems of Chinese Literature, and (1889, 1926) Chuang Tzŭ, Mystic, Moralist, and Social Reformer. Giles' other writings include some of the first general histories of China, the (1901) A History of Chinese Literature, (1906) Religions of Ancient China, and (1911) The Civilization of China.

Herbert Giles says he decided to compile A Chinese–English Dictionary after his review of Williams' A Syllabic Dictionary of the Chinese Language "brought down on my head many objurgations from the author's friends". As Giles explains in his previously unpublished (c. 1918–1925) typescript memoirs,

[The] review was of Dr Williams' Syllabic Dictionary (Evening Gazette, 16 Sept., 1874), for which I was freely bespattered with abuse from all American quarters. I showed up a multiplicity of absurd blunders and equally egregious omissions; and I wound up with these prophetic words: "We do not hesitate to pronounce Dr Williams the lexicographer, not for the future, but of the past." I at once began upon a dictionary of my own.

Provoked by the American missionary Williams, Giles devoted himself to publishing a new dictionary that "was meant to bring the glory of having compiled the best Chinese–English dictionary back from America to England".

Five years later, Giles published a 40-page brochure (1879) On some Translations and Mistranslations in Dr. Williams' Syllabic Dictionary that was reported extensively among English-language newspapers published in China. "I was badly mauled" in the Daily Press (Hong Kong), "received unstinted praise" in the North China Daily News, and was supported in the Chinese Recorder and Missionary Journal, which said "the Dictionary is in fault in most of the instances given." Giles sent a copy of his brochure to Williams, but received no reply. Since Williams reprinted his dictionary from stereotype plates, he was unable to make corrections, and added, in 1883, an Errata and Corrections on a fly-sheet at the end—without acknowledgement of Giles' corrections.

Herbert Giles continued working on his Chinese–English dictionary for 15 years until 1889 when the Foreign Office granted his request to be stationed as Consul at Ningpo, where the workload was light and he could prepare the manuscript for press. The Shanghai publishers Kelly & Walsh printed the dictionary in 4 fascicules from 1891 to 1892.

The first edition A Chinese–English Dictionary (1892), which Bernard Quaritch also published in London, had 2 royal quarto (250 by 320 mm.) volumes comprising a 46-page front matter (9-page Preface and 32-page Philological Essay) and the 1415-page dictionary, printed in triple columns, beginning with 60 pages of tables. The price was $35.

For the subsequent two decades, Giles diligently worked "to correct mistakes, cut out duplicates and unnecessary matter, prepare revised Tables, and add a very large number of new phrases, taken from my reading in modern as well as in ancient literature". In 1903 Lord Lansdowne, then Foreign Secretary, asked Sir Ernest Satow, then Minister in Peking, by letter whether a new edition should be purchased for the British Peking legation and consulates, and whether publication should be funded from the Civil List Fund. After consulting with Giles, Satow supported the new publication in a letter dated May 29, 1903, stating "I understand from the author that the new edition is not a mere reproduction of the first. Mistakes have been corrected, further meanings have been added to many characters, frequent cross-references have been introduced, and no fewer than ten thousand new phrases have been distributed over the entries as they now stand, chiefly drawn from sources in which the Dictionary has been found to be deficient".

The revised and enlarged second edition (1912) was likewise published by Kelly & Walsh and Bernard Quaritch in 7 fascicules printed from 1909 to 1912. It had 2 royal quarto volumes, with Part I comprising a 17-page preface (with extracts from the first edition) and 84 pages of tables; and Part II comprising the dictionary itself, printed in triple columns. Compared with the first edition of 1,461 total pages, the 1,813-page second edition is 398 pages longer. Giles produced the first edition entirely at his own risk, and it cost £2300, towards which the Foreign Office gave £300. The second edition cost £4800, towards which they gave £250.

Giles' Chinese–English dictionary remained in "constant use" for generations. A compact edition was reprinted by Paragon Books (Chicago) in 1964, Ch'eng Wen (Taipei) in 1978, and is still available online.

Giles learned that Edmund Backhouse, one of his first Chinese language students at Cambridge, had been trying for years to compile a Chinese–English dictionary. In 1925, he used it to metaphorically describe Chinese bilingual lexicography in terms of international sports competition.

[Backhouse's dictionary] is of course intended to supersede my own work. Well, dictionaries are like dogs, and have their day; and I should be the last person to whine over the appearance of the dictionary of the future, which it is to be hoped will come in good time, and will help to an easier acquisition of "the glorious language." Morrison and Medhurst, both Englishmen, between them held the blue ribbon of Chinese lexicography from 1816 to 1874; then it passed to Wells Williams, who held it for America until 1892, when I think I may claim to have recaptured it for my own country, and to have held it now for thirty-three years.

In the history of bilingual Chinese lexicography, Giles' Dictionary is the fourth major Chinese–English dictionary after Robert Morrison's (1815–1823) A Dictionary of the Chinese Language, Walter Henry Medhurst's (1842) Chinese and English Dictionary, and Samuel Wells Williams' (1874) A Syllabic Dictionary of the Chinese Language. Giles' dictionary was superseded by Robert Henry Mathews' (1931) A Chinese–English Dictionary Compiled for the China Inland Mission. In contrast to Morrison, Medhurst, Williams, and Mathews, who were all Christian missionaries in China, Giles was an agnostic anti-clericalist.

The historian Huiling Yang found that although Giles strongly criticized Williams' dictionary, it turns out that Giles' own dictionary is more closely linked to Williams' than to Morrison's, which Giles praised highly. Medhurst's, Williams', and Giles' Chinese–English dictionaries are all members of a tradition that originated with Morrison's work. Each of their dictionaries made contributions and improvements to the art of Chinese–English dictionary compilation.

Giles' preface to the second edition gives a "Comparative Table of Phrases under Various Characters, Taken as Specimens, to illustrate the Progress of Chinese–English Lexicography", for example:

	Morrison, 1819	Medhurst, 1843	Williams, 1874	Giles, 1892	Giles, 1912
說 to speak	11	15	28	96	129
山 mountains	17	6	19	89	109
生 to be born	21	27	42	135	162
打 to strike	23	21	24	167	172
石 stones	20	19	23	76	89
如 as if	8	6	18	78	112

== Content ==
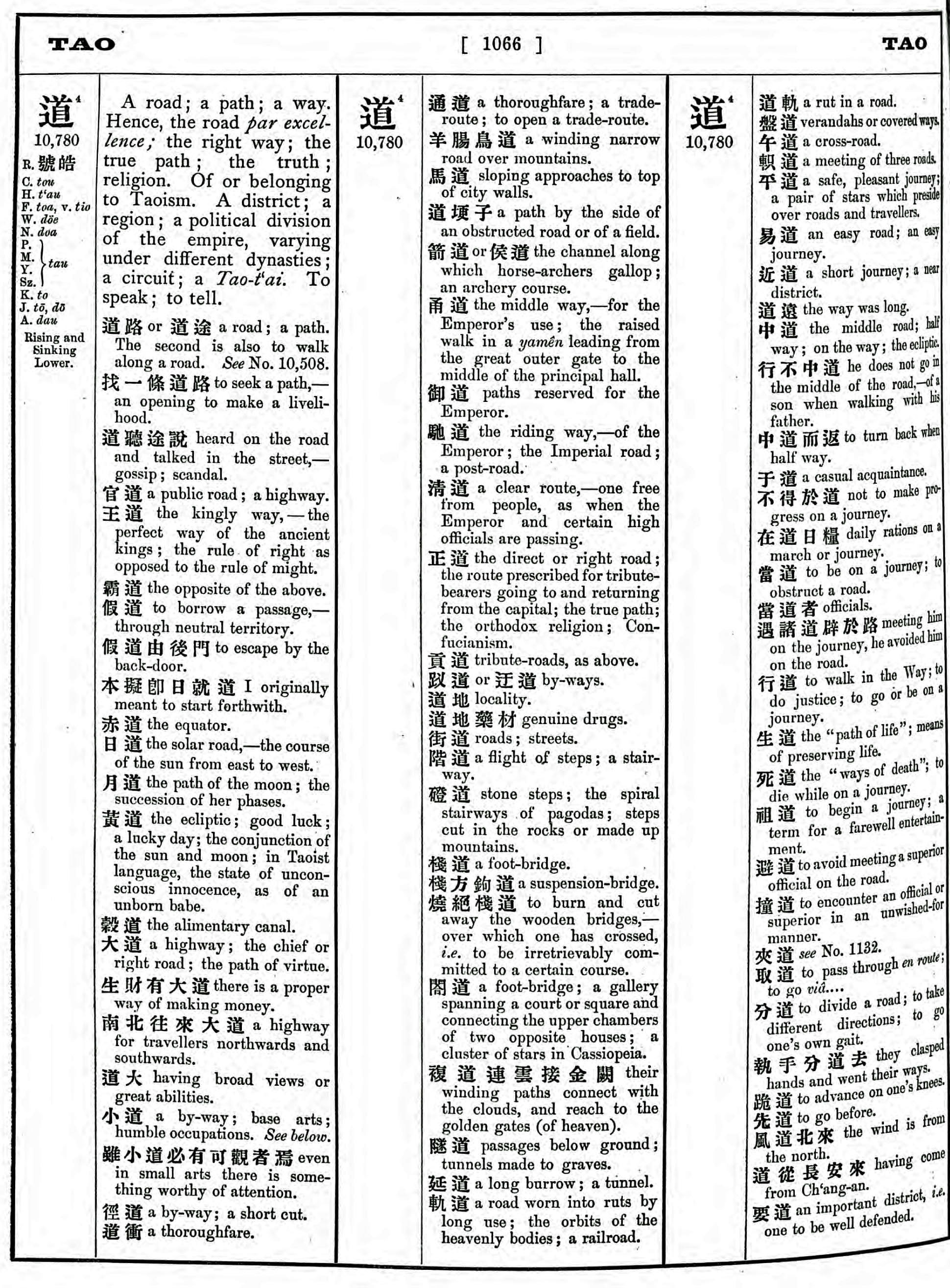
Sample page from Giles' A Chinese–English Dictionary

Herbert Giles worked for 18 years to compile and publish the 1892 first edition A Chinese–English Dictionary, which contains 10,859 character head entries plus 2,989 variant characters for a total of 13,848 entries. He decided to number every head entry—an improvement lacking in the earlier dictionaries of Morrison, Medhurst, and Williams—in order to facilitate internal cross-referencing and make it easier for users to find characters. Giles subsequently worked for 20 years revising and adding "a vast number of compounds and phrases" to the 1912 second edition, which contains 10,926 head entries (67 more) plus 2,922 variants, also totaling 13,848.

Despite the addition of new head entries to the second edition, Giles kept the original 13,848 numerical arrangement owing to an unintended consequence. People in China were using the dictionary numbers as a Chinese telegraph code, that is, a character encoding index for telegraphs written in Chinese characters—analogous with modern Chinese input methods for computers. Another example of using Giles' 13,848 numbers to index characters is Vernon Nash's (1936) Trindex: an Index to Three Dictionaries or San zidian yinde 三字典引得, for A Chinese–English Dictionary, (1711) Peiwen Yunfu rime dictionary, and (1716) Kangxi Dictionary.

The dictionary is alphabetically collated by Beijing Mandarin pronunciation romanized in the Wade–Giles system, a, ai, an, ang, etc. Within each syllabic pronunciation section, characters sharing the same phonetic element and different graphic radicals are arranged together, for instance, the phonetic ai^{4} 艾 (number 32) "mugwort; artemisia" is followed by ai^{4} 哎 (33, with the mouth radical) "an interjection of surprise", ai^{4} 餀 (34, food radical) "food which has been spoilt", and ai^{4} 鴱 (35, bird radical) "the hen of the tailor-bird".

Pronunciations are glossed in late 19th-century Beijing Mandarin. In addition, Giles glosses pronunciations in archaic Middle Chinese rime ("R." according to the Peiwen Yunfu rime dictionary) and fanqie, nine regional varieties of Chinese (commonly mistaken for mutually-understandable "dialects"), and the Japanese, Vietnamese, and Korean languages. Giles' dictionary went far beyond Williams', which glosses pronunciations in Middle Chinese and four regional varieties: Shantou, Amoy, Fuzhou, and Shanghai Chinese. Giles' dictionary abbreviates the nine varieties ("dialects") by their initial letter: C. Cantonese, H. Hakka, F. Foochow, W. Wênchow, N. Ningpo, P. Pekingese, M. "Mid-China", Y. Yangchow, and S. Ssuch'uan, as well as in K. Korean, J. Japanese, and A. Annamese languages.

Tones are annotated with a superscript number in the upper right of a character or romanized word; the four tones of Beijing Mandarin are indicated as 1 "high-level", 2 "rising", 3 "dipping", and 4 "falling". In the first edition, Giles uses 5 to denote alternate tonal pronunciations that he had heard, eruditely described as "tra cotanto senno" (Italian for "amid such wisdom", from Dante's Inferno). The prior dictionaries of Morrison, Williams, and Medhurst annotate tones in terms of the traditional four tones of Middle Chinese pronunciation used in rime dictionaries such as the Kangxi; namely píng 平 "level" tone, shàng 上 "rising", qù 去 "departing", and rù 入"entering" tone. Giles uses an asterisk to indicate archaic entering tone, with ^{2*} denoting second tone with a -p, -t, or -k stop consonant. Despite the historical fact that the "entering" tone had already ceased to exist in 19th-century Beijing pronunciation, Norman notes that early Chinese–English dictionaries were "much concerned with including it". Many early dictionaries of Mandarin Chinese in Western languages were explicitly concerned not with the Beijing pronunciation of their time, but instead with Southern Mandarin, a koiné widely used up to the second half of the 19th century.

Dictionary pages are formatted in three columns, each split between the head entry character, number, and pronunciations on the left, and the translation equivalents ("definitions"), cross references, and subentries of terms on the right. Giles attempts to arrange the subentry example words and phrases according to the order of the translation equivalents. The dictionary's approximately "hundred thousand examples" diversely range from the "best and highest planes of Chinese thought" to everyday words and nursery rhymes.

The Chinese character 道 for dào "way; path; say; the Dao" or dǎo "guide; lead; conduct; instruct; direct" (or 導 clarified with Radical 41 寸 "thumb; inch") is a good litmus test for a dictionary because it has two pronunciations and complex semantics. The sample entry from Giles' dictionary for tao^{4} 道^{4} (10,780) gives the character and number over pronunciations from Cantonese tou to Vietnamese dau on the left, and the translation equivalents and examples on the right. Note that {} brackets indicate translation equivalents added in the second edition.

A road; a path; a way. Hence; the road par excellence; the right way; the true path; {the λόγος of the New Test.; identified by Kingsmill with the Buddhist Mârga, the path which leads to Nirvâna;} the truth; religion{; principles see 8032}. Of or belonging to Taoism {see 太極 859}. A district; a region; a political division of the empire, varying under different dynasties; a circuit; a Tao-t'ai. To speak; to tell. {A numerative; see entries.}.

The 1912 second edition adds references to Christian Greek scriptural λόγος logos, Thomas William Kingsmill's (1899) Daodejing translation comparing dào with Sanskrit mārga "path; (Buddhist) paths to liberation", the meaning "principles" under mou 謀^{2} (8032) "to plot; to scheme", "Tai chi" 太極 under 極^{2*} (859), dàotái 道臺 "(historical) the magistrate of a dào district/circuit", and the syntactic use of 道 as a classifier or measure word for rivers/topics/etc.

The first edition 道^{4} entry gives 230 examples of words and phrases for tao^{4} "way; path" (e.g., "黃道 the ecliptic; good luck; a lucky day; the conjunction of the sun and moon; in Taoist language, the state of unconscious innocence, as of an unborn babe"), and "Read tao^{3}. To lead; see No. 10,781" with 6 examples. The second edition gives 255 examples (for instance, adding "一達謂之道 that which passes through is called tao", quoting the Shuowen Jiezi dictionary definition of dào) and "Read tao^{3}. To lead; see 10,781" and 6 examples. The following tao^{3} 導^{3} (10,781) "To lead; to guide" entry gives 7 examples in the first edition and 8 in the second, for instance "導師 the guiding Teacher—Buddha".

Herbert Giles created the first Chinese–English encyclopedic dictionary in two ways, with comprehensive explanations under head entries and with informative tables. His example was followed by many later Chinese–English dictionaries up to the present time. First, some dictionary entries include in-depth information. Take pǔlu 氆氇 "a woolen fabric made in Tibet" as an example. Giles gives P'u^{3} 氆^{3} (9514) "An open-woven, thick woolen cloth, either plain or flowered, with a nap on one side, known as 氆氇. It comes from Tibet, and is used for making the winter caps of Lamas. Known to the Mongols as cheng-mé and chalma." Second, Giles's dictionary has six tables, in addition to the requisite table of the 214 Kangxi Radicals (essential for using a radical-and-stroke index) included by Morrison, Medhurst, and Williams. The tables are for Insignia of Official Rank, The Family Names, The Chinese Dynasties, Topographical, The Calendar, and Miscellaneous (Chinese numerals). Another table is found in the dictionary front matter, called the Table of Sounds or Table of Sounds for Dialects.

Giles was the first Chinese–English lexicographer to systematically include homographs "a character with two or more readings" (which he calls "duplicate characters"). For instance, the character 長 can be pronounced cháng "long; lasting", zhǎng "grow up; increase", or zhàng "plenty; surplus": Wade–Giles ch'ang^{2}, chang^{3} and chang^{4}, respectively. The main entry ch'ang^{2} 長^{2} (450) first has "Long, of time or space, as opposed to 短 short. Excelling; advantageous; profitable." with 59 words and phrases (e.g., "長生 long life; immortality. Used as a euphemism for coffins, death, etc."); then "Read chang^{3}. Old; senior. To excel; to increase; to grow." with 38 ("長妾 the senior concubine"); and then "Read chang^{4}. with 4 terms (e.g., 無長物 there is nothing over."). The alternate entry chang 長 [no tone] (408) says "See 450."

== Reception ==
Giles' A Chinese–English Dictionary has received both acclaim and censure. An early critic, the Chinese Malayan scholar Gu Hongming (1857–1928) criticized Giles' lack of overall insight into Chinese literature, and said

It is this want of philosophical insight in Dr. Giles which makes him so helpless in the arrangement of his materials in his books. Take for instance his great dictionary. It is in no sense a dictionary at all. It is merely a collection of Chinese phrases and sentences, translated by Dr. Giles without any attempt at selection, arrangement, order or method. As a dictionary for the purposes of the scholar, Dr. Giles' dictionary is decidedly of less value than even the old dictionary of Dr. Williams.

Arthur C. Moule, son of the Anglican missionary George Moule, wrote a critical review of Giles' dictionary, for instance, the 否^{3} entry (3596) gives fou^{3} "Not; on the contrary; negative" and p'i^{3} "Bad; wicked. One of the diagrams." "Diagram" refers to the Yijing Hexagram 12 pǐ 否 "Obstruction". Moule says fou, p'i, or pei [sic] has three meanings: "not", "to obstruct; an obstacle", and "evil", but Giles accidentally omitted the second, which is the hexagram's meaning.

The English sinologist Charles Aylmer, who first published The Memoirs of H. A. Giles from a Cambridge University Library manuscript, gives a balanced evaluation on the dictionary. Aylmer says the second edition "impresses by its sheer bulk" but falls short of the "highest standards of the best 19th-century lexicography". First, the dictionary does not cite sources for terms, but diversely includes both Classical Chinese literary archaisms from sources like the Kangxi Dictionary and modern vernacular colloquialisms that Giles "laboriously collected from books read and conversations held during a long stretch of years." Second, Giles failed to indicate stylistic level, which he justifies on the "(somewhat specious) grounds" that, "No division of phraseology into classical and colloquial has been made, for the simple reason that no real line of demarcation exists. Expressions are used in ordinary conversation which occur in the Book of Odes. The book-language fades imperceptibly into the colloquial". A third lexicographical shortcoming is the random arrangement of subentries, "requiring the reader to con up and down the columns". As a general rule, Giles explains, "the meanings found in the Classics stand first, and more modern and colloquial meanings follow. But to this rule there are some striking exceptions, purposely introduced, so as not to impair any value this Dictionary may have as a practical book of reference." Despite these deficiencies, Aylers says Giles' dictionary "held the field for many decades and lives on in successors", such as Robert Mathews' (1931) A Chinese–English Dictionary Compiled for the China Inland Mission, many of whose definitions "are taken, without acknowledgment, from Giles".

Today the dictionary is most often cited as the locus classicus of the Wade–Giles romanisation system, for which the name of Giles is widely known even to non-specialists. Apart from this, its practical use is mainly as a repository of late Ch'ing bureaucratic phraseology, though it is replete with fascinating nuggets of information and is a wonderful book for browsing.

The American sinologist and linguist Jerry Norman calls Giles' dictionary the "first truly adequate Chinese–English dictionary", with pronunciation glosses that were "by and large free of the artificiality found in earlier works". He also says that Giles, like his predecessors, mixed literary and colloquial definitions together without distinction, and concludes that the dictionary "remains a rich depository of nineteenth-century Peking colloquial words and phrases, in other respects it has been superseded by later dictionaries".

A recent book on Chinese lexicography says Giles' dictionary has "special significance and interest" and "enjoys pride of place in the history of Chinese bilingual dictionaries as the authoritative source for the Wade–Giles system of Romanization".

The English sinologist and historian Endymion Wilkinson says Giles' dictionary is "still interesting as a repository of late Qing documentary Chinese, although there is little or no indication of the citations, mainly from the Kangxi zidian)".
