= Yang Lien-sheng =

American sinologist

- 楊聯陞
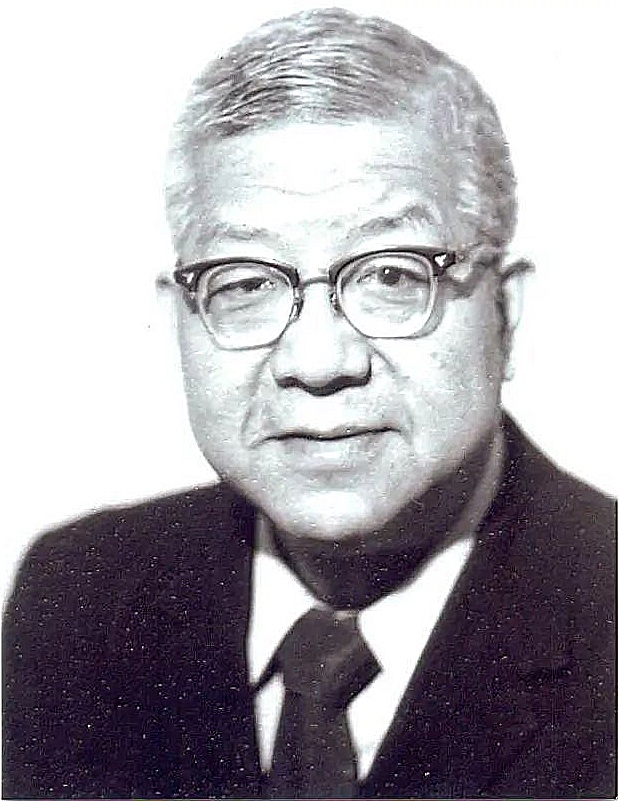
- Born: July 26, 1914; Baoding, Hebei Province, Republic of China
- Died: November 16, 1990 (aged 76); Arlington, Massachusetts, U.S.
- Education: Tsinghua University (BA); Harvard University (MA, PhD)
- Scientific career
- Fields: Sinology
- Workplaces: Harvard University

Chinese name
- Traditional Chinese: 楊聯陞
- Simplified Chinese: 杨联升
Transcriptions
Standard Mandarin
- Hanyu Pinyin: Yáng Liánshēng
- Wade–Giles: Yang^{2} Lien^{2}-sheng^{1}
- IPA: [jǎŋ ljɛ̌n.ʂə́ŋ]

Yang Lien-sheng (Chinese: 楊聯陞; July 26, 1914 – November 16, 1990) who often wrote under the name L.S. Yang, was a Chinese-American sinologist and professor at Harvard University. He was the first full-time historian of China at Harvard and a prolific scholar specializing in China's economic history.

== Positions and honors ==
- Harvard University: Far Eastern Languages and Cultures Department (later renamed the Department of East Asian Languages and Cultures), Associate Professor (1947 - 1958) Harvard University Professor Department of Far Eastern Languages and Cultures(1958 -1980); Harvard Yenching Chinese History Professor (1965 -1980) Harvard University Professor emeritus (1980 -1990)
- Elected Academician, Academia Sinica (1959)

== Career ==
Yang entered Tsinghua University in 1933 and studied in the department of economics, graduating in 1937. As an undergraduate, he would have preferred to study liberal arts, but because of his father's preference, he entered the department of economics. He nonetheless studied with the eminent historian Chen Yinke, who supervised his thesis. Other professors and influences included Qian Mu, Lei Haizong, and Tao Xisheng in Chinese studies, and in English, Ye Gongchao (George Yeh). Yang also benefited from instruction in the Japanese language from Qian Daosun, whom Yang later scorned for becoming a puppet administrator for the Japanese after 1938. On the introduction of Zhou Yiliang, Yang became language tutor to Charles Sidney Gardner. Gardner became a professor at Harvard, and helped Yang to enroll there, and was especially helpful to Yang after he arrived.

In 1940, Yang started graduate work at Harvard University, receiving his M.A. degree in 1942. Charles Gardner provided not only practical help, but moral support. He then assisted Y.R. Chao in a wartime language program for the United States military, and collaborated with Chao on the Concise Dictionary of Spoken Chinese (Harvard University Press, 1947), noted as one of the first dictionaries of whole Chinese words rather than Chinese characters. In 1946, he received his PhD degree for his doctoral thesis, “Notes on the Economic History of the Chin Dynasty." (晉書·食貨志譯注). After becoming assistant professor in 1947, in 1958 he became full professor. He taught many graduate students who went on to careers in the field, including Yu Ying-shih, Kao Yu-kung, Chang Fu-mei, Chang Chun-shu, and Rulan Chao Pian.

His first book, Money and Credit in China (中國的貨幣與信用) (Harvard-Yenching Institute 1952) was a slim volume of little over 100 pages, but provided the foundation for research by many scholars because it clarified some 300 basic terms, put trends in chronological order, and put these trends against the political and military historical background. His numerous publications in the Harvard Journal of Asiatic Studies included investigations of historical linguistics as well as Han dynasty bronze TLV mirrors, female rulers, hostages, the ancient game Liubo, and schedules of work and rest in imperial China. Beginning in the 1940s, he responded to the requests of fellow Harvard professor John King Fairbank for summary but wide-ranging articles on such topics as "China's traditional worldview" and social attitudes.

Yang’s diaries reveal that in the 1950s he felt doubtful of many foreign scholars, wary of Fairbank’s political skills and Benjamin Schwartz’s generalizations. At times his mental condition was not good, and he was even given electric shock treatment An attempt by his friend Ho Ping-ti to arrange a move from Harvard to University of Chicago did not work out. Even being awarded a full professorship in 1958 did not put his heart at ease, and he returned to Beijing in 1974, at the end of the Cultural Revolution. In 1977. since there were then no direct flights between the U.S. and China, they went by way of Zurich arriving in Beijing Fourth of July evening. Yang saw his mother, traveled extensively, reunited with a number of old colleagues and met younger scholars. He was struck by their isolation from world scholarship, however,

== Personal life and friendships ==
Yang's interests were wide and deep. As a student in the 1930s at the Beijing Normal University High School, he was known for the strength of his poetry and style of painting, which went beyond the amateur level, and he excelled at the board game weiqi. He and a band of friends formed an opera school and performed traditional Peking opera. Even after he retired, Yang and his Tsinghua classmate Ho Ping-ti sang arias together after a dinner at Ho's home at the University of Chicago.

Friendship and hospitality were important parts of his life. His modest home in Cambridge was the site for many dinners for Chinese students and visiting scholars. Yang worked very hard to maintain relations with old friends in Taiwan and, after relations with the People's Republic resumed, with scholars there. Hu Shih, the leading scholar in the New Culture Movement which dominated Chinese cultural life starting in the 1910s, was an especially close friend and colleague. Their initial exchange of views on Chinese poetry grew into a wide exploration of Chinese culture. They exchanged dozens of letters in the 1940s and 1950s, and Hu was an important sponsor for Yang's entrance into the Academia Sinica in Taiwan in 1959.

Yang began to suffer bouts of serious depression in the 1950s, and even attempted suicide. In later years he sometimes became angry at old friends. He died at his home in Arlington, Massachusetts, in his sleep on November 16, 1990.

== Selected works ==
- Yang, Liansheng (1914-1990 WorldCat Authority Page

Books

- Chao, Yuen Ren and Liansheng Yang (1947). Concise Dictionary of Spoken Chinese. Cambridge: Published for the Harvard-Yenching Institute by ard University Press.
- Yang, Liansheng (1950). Topics in Chinese history. Cambridge, Mass.: Harvard University Press.
- —— (1952). Money and Credit in China, a Short History. Cambridge: Harvard University Press.
- —— (1953). Selected Chinese Texts in the Classical and Colloquial Styles. Cambridge, Mass.: Published for the Harvard-Yenching Institute, Harvard University Press.
- —— (1961). Studies in Chinese Institutional History. Cambridge: Harvard University Press.
- —— (1964). Les Aspects Économiques Des Travaux Publics Dans La Chine Impériale. Paris: Collège de France.
- —— (1969). Excursions in Sinology. Cambridge, MA: Harvard University Press.
- —— (1981). Nei Ran Ji She Ji. Peking: Zhongguo nong ye ji xie chu ban she.
- —— (1982). Sinological Studies and Reviews. T*ai-pei shih: Shih-Huo Publisher Co.
- —— (1983). Guo Shi Tan Wei. Taibei Shi: Lian jing chu ban shi ye gong si.
- —— (1987). Zhongguo Wen Hua Zhong "Bao", "Bao", "Bao" Zhi Yi Yi. Xianggang: Zhong wen da xue chu ban she. ISBN 9622013783.
- —— (1992). Yang Liansheng Lun Wen Ji. Peking: Zhongguo she hui ke xue chu ban she : Xin hua shu dian jing xiao. ISBN 7500402104.
- and Li Jiang (2004). Hafo Yi Mo : Yang Liansheng Shi Wen Jian. Beijing: Shang wu yin shu guan. ISBN 7100042372.
- —— (2007). Zhongguo Zhi Du Shi Yan Jiu = Studies in Chinese Institutional History. Nanjing: Feng huang chu ban zhuan mei ji tuan : Jiangsu ren min chu ban she. ISBN 9787214023124.
- — (1998). 論學談詩二十年: 胡適楊聯陞往來書札 Lun Xue Tan Shi Er Shi Nian : Hu Shi Yang Liansheng Wang Lai Shu Zha. Taibei Shi: Lian jing chu ban shi ye gong si. ISBN 9570817763.

Representative articles

- Yang, Lien-sheng (1957). "The Concept of Pao as a Basis for Social Relations in China". Chinese Thought and Institutions. Chicago: University of Chicago Press: 291–309.
- —— (1947). "A Note on the So-Called TLV Mirrors and the Game Liu-Po". Harvard Journal of Asiatic Studies. 9 (3/4): 202–206. doi:10.2307/2717892. JSTOR 2717892.
- —— (1955). "Schedules of Work and Rest in Imperial China". Harvard Journal of Asiatic Studies. 18 (3/4): 301–325. doi:10.2307/2718436. JSTOR 2718436.
- —— (1957). "Economic Justification for Spending: An Uncommon Idea in Traditional China". Harvard Journal of Asiatic Studies. 20 (1/2): 36–52. doi:10.2307/2718520. JSTOR 2718520.
- —— (1960). "Female Rulers in Imperial China". Harvard Journal of Asiatic Studies. 23: 47–61. doi:10.2307/2718567. JSTOR 2718567.
- —— (1961), Foreword to the Second Printing, Chinese Traditional Historiography, by Charles S. Gardner, Harvard University Press
- and JK Fairbank (1968). "The Chinese World Order". The Chinese World Order: Traditional China's Foreign Relations. 32: 20.
- —— (1970). "Government Control of Urban Merchants in Traditional China" (PDF). Tsing Hua Journal of Chinese Studies. 8 (1–2): 186–206.
