= G. Brooks Earnest =

American academic administrator (1902–1992)

- Born: October 2, 1902; Mifflintown, Pennsylvania, USA
- Died: September 13, 1992 (aged 89); West Bloomfield, Michigan, USA
- Occupation: Fourth President of Fenn College
- Spouse: Mary Alice McKeighan

Dr. G. Brooks Earnest (born George Brooks Earnest) (October 2, 1902 in Mifflintown, Pennsylvania – September 13, 1992 in West Bloomfield, Michigan,), was a distinguished American educator, administrator, and the fourth and last president of Fenn College.

== Education ==
Earnest graduated from high school in Altoona, Pennsylvania. He graduated in 1927 from the Case Institute of Technology with a degree in civil engineering. Earnest earned his M.S. from Case Institute in 1933.

== Case Institute of Technology ==
In 1930 he joined the faculty of the Case Institute of Technology as an instructor of engineering. He became a professor of engineering surveying and director of Camp Case in 1948.

== Fenn College ==
=== Dean of the School of Engineering ===
Earnest, a member of the faculty at Case Institute of Technology was nominated for the position of Dean of the School of Engineering at Fenn College at a joint meeting of the board executive and personnel committees held on September 7, 1950. Earnest received official approval of this on December 4, 1950 by the Fenn College board of trustees. The appointment was effective on February 1, 1951.

=== President ===
At a board meeting on January 28, 1952 it was recommended through a report submitted that Earnest be appointed the acting president of Fenn College. The board unanimously approved it. He was named the permanent president on September 22, 1952. He served as the President of Fenn College until August 31, 1965 when Fenn College's assets were given to the State of Ohio to create Cleveland State University.

== Honors ==
The American Society of Civil Engineers, Cleveland section established the G. Brooks Earnest Technical Lecture Award in "appreciation of the life-long services of G. Brooks Earnest."

== Personal life ==
Earnest was born to John Harry Earnest and Mary Catharine Earnest (née Showers). He was married to Mary Alice Earnest (née McKeighan) on February 8, 1928. They had two sons, Samuel Allen of Murrysville, Pennsylvania. and David Brooks of West Bloomfield, Michigan.
