= Courtenay Hughes Fenn =

American Presbyterian missionary to China

Courtenay Hughes Fenn, or C. H. Fenn, (April 11, 1866 – 1953) was an American Presbyterian missionary to China, and compiler of The Five Thousand Dictionary, a widely used basic Chinese-English dictionary that has gone through numerous reprints. Fenn's Chinese name was 芳泰瑞 (Fang Tairui).

Fenn was born in 1866 at Clyde, New York, U.S.A., the son of Samuel P. Fenn and Martha Wilson, and was ordained in 1890. He married Alice Holstein May Castle (d. 1938) on 8 June 1892 in Washington DC. They had a daughter, Martha Wilson Fenn, and two sons, Henry Courtenay Fenn, well-known American China scholar and architect of Yale University's Chinese language program, more commonly known as H. C. Fenn, (February 26, 1894 - July 1978), and William Purviance Fenn (1902 - April 21, 1993 ) general secretary of the United Board for Christian Higher Education in Asia.

In China, Fenn was active in the Presbyterian Overseas Mission Board. He provided a photographic album as firsthand evidence of the Boxer Rebellion and Siege of Peking, 1900, now archived in the Yale Divinity Library, along with his typescript diary. Fenn had perhaps a rather dark view of his Chinese contemporaries, as can be adduced from several remarks attributed to him in New Forces in Old China (1904) by Arthur Judson Brown:

Any man who has had the least occasion to deal with Chinese courts knows that `every man has his price,' that not only every underling can be bought, but that 999 out of every 1,000 officials, high or low, will favour the man who offers the most money.

...every village and town and city—it would not be a very serious exaggeration to say every home,--fairly reeks with impurity.

I would be almost willing to assert that it is impossible for a man, brought up in China, then spending many years abroad, to return to China and write such a book in honesty and sincerity of heart. He could not possibly help knowing that nine-tenths of what he was writing about China was absolutely untrue, that her political, legal, social, domestic and personal life are rotten to the core...

Isaac Taylor Headland of Peking University, in his book The Chinese Boy and Girl, recounts that his own interest in Chinese children's rhymes began with a summer-time conversation with Mrs. Fenn on the veranda of the Fenns' house in the hills, fifteen miles west of Peking, in which he heard a nurse teach the following rhyme to her child Henry Fenn:

He climbed up the candlestick,
The little mousey brown,
To steal and eat tallow,
And he couldn't get down.
He called for his grandma,
But his grandma was in town,
So he doubled up into a wheel,
And rolled himself down.

== Selected works ==
- The Providence of God in the Siege of Peking, date unknown
- "The American Marines in the Siege of Peking." Independent 52, no. 2713 (29 November 1900): 2845-2849
- Over against the treasury; or, Companions of the present Christ, a vision, 1910
- With you always; a sequel to "Over against the treasury,", 1911
- The Five Thousand Dictionary (1926 and revisions), with Mr. Chin Hsien Tseng
- The Chinese English Pocket Dictionary (1944)
