= Fred Fangyu Wang =

Chinese calligrapher

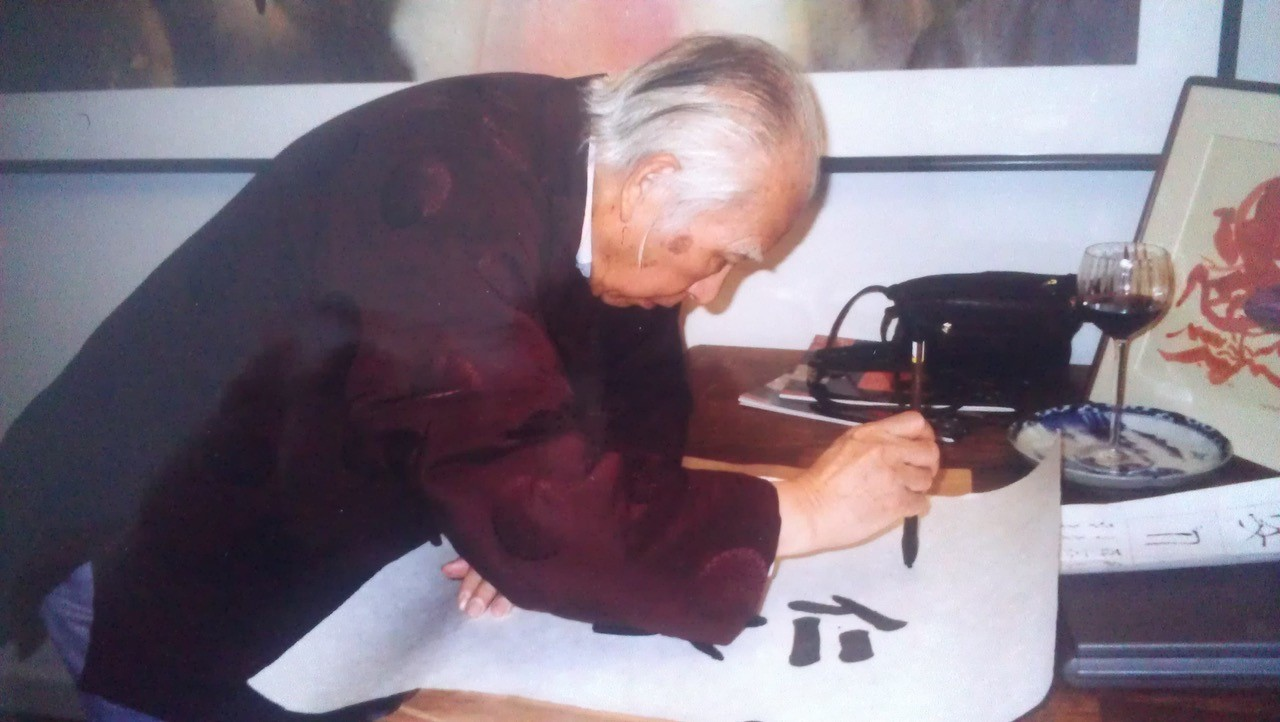

Fred Fangyu Wang (Chinese: 王方宇; pinyin: Wáng Fāngyǔ; 1913 – October 6, 1997) was a Chinese calligrapher, art collector, and a Professor of Chinese at Yale University and Seton Hall University.

== Biography ==
Wang was born in Beijing in 1913, and emigrated to United States of America in 1945. Fred was an alumnus of the Catholic University in Beijing and Columbia University in New York City. In the 1940s he worked with Henry Courtenay Fenn on Chinese grammar at the Institute of Far Eastern Languages at Yale. He taught Chinese language and literature between 1945 and 1965 at Yale. At Seton Hall University, he was the chairman of the department of Asian studies and founder and curator of the Wang Fangyu Collection of Asian Art. He was also part of the team which developed the first Chinese language teaching computer system. Several books and dictionaries on the Chinese language and calligraphy were written by him.

Wang Fangyu was also a calligrapher in his own right, taking up the art later in life. His work has been shown in numerous venues including: E & J Frankel Gallery, 1980 (New York, NY), Rijksmuseum Voor Volkenkunde, 1981 (Leiden, Netherlands), Asia Society, 1984, (New York, NY), University of Iowa, 1991, National Museum of Far Eastern Antiquities, 1994 (Stockholm, Sweden) The Newark Museum, 2000 (Newark, New Jersey) Duke University Art Museum, 2002 (Durham, North Carolina). His work is in the Seton Hall University Permanent Collection.

Wang was also an avid collector of Bada Shanren paintings and calligraphies. During his lifetime, he and his wife Sum Wai (沈慧) amassed the largest private collection of Bada Shanren's art. The Freer Gallery of Art later bought the entire collection from the couple's estate.

When he died, he left behind relatives in mainland China, Taiwan, and the USA.

== Works ==
- Wang, Fred Fang-yü (1958). Chinese Cursive Script : An Introduction to Handwriting in Chinese. Far Eastern Publications Series. Yale University Press. ISBN 9780887100338.
- Wang, Fred Fangyu (2002). Mandarin Chinese Dictionary: Chinese-English (unabridged, reprint ed.). Courier Dover Publications. ISBN 0486424774.
- Wang, Fangyu (1983). Mandarin Chinese Dictionary: English-Chinese. Mei Ya Pub.
- Wang, Fangyu (1972). Introduction to Literary Chinese, Volume 1. Seton Hall University Press.
- Wang, Fred Fangyu (1972). Introduction to Literary Chinese, Volume 2. Seton Hall University Press.
- Wang, Fangyu (1972). Text. Vol. 1 of Introduction to Literary Chinese, Fangyu Wang. Seton Hall University Press.
- Wang, Fred Fangyu (1972). 文言入門. Eston Hall University Press.
- Wang, Fred Fang-yu (1983). Huar shang de meiren. Far Eastern Publications.
- Wang, Fred Fangyu (1985). Basic Skills in English/orange Level/grade 9. Mcdougal Littell Houghton. ISBN 9993117129.
- Wang, Fangyu (1999). A Literati Life in the Twentieth Century: Wang Fangyu, Artist, Scholar, Connoisseur. Contributor China Institute in America. China Institute of America.
- Ross, Claudia; Wang, Fangyu (2008). The Lady in the Painting: A Basic Chinese Reader. Illustrated by Luke Chen, Contributor Jocelyn Ross (illustrated ed.). Yale University Press. ISBN 978-0300125160.
- Wang, Fred Fang Yu; Ross, Claudia (1966). Fenn, Henry C.; Lee, Pao-Chen (eds.). Character Text for Chinese Dialogues. Yale University Press. ISBN 0887100074.
- Wang, Fred Fang-Yu; Ross, Claudia (1953). Lee, Pao-ch'en; Fenn, Henry C. (eds.). Chinese Dialogues: An Intermediate Level Text for Modern Chinese. Far Eastern Publications Series. Far Eastern Publications, Yale University. ISBN 0887100147.
- Chang, Richard I. (2011). Wang, Fang-Yu (ed.). Read Chinese: A Beginning Text in the Chinese Character, Book 2. Contributor Henry C. Fenn. Literary Licensing, LLC. ISBN 978-1258081744.
- Wang, Fred Fangyu; Fenn, H C; Tewskbury, M Gardiner (1961). Lee, Pao-Ch'En (ed.). Read Chinese. Jeffrey Norton Pub. ISBN 0884320901.
