= Sereno Peck Fenn =

- Born: April 25, 1844; Tallmadge, Ohio, U.S.
- Died: January 3, 1927 (aged 82); Cleveland, Ohio, U.S.
- Resting place: Lake View Cemetery, Cleveland, Ohio, U.S. 41.5099°N 81.5906°W
- Occupation: Partner of Sherwin-Williams
- Spouse: Helen Barry Wright

Sereno Peck Fenn (April 25, 1844 – January 3, 1927) was an early partner in Sherwin-Williams. He was hired as a bookkeeper in 1870 for the Sherwin-Williams Company, and was made a partner ten years later. Fenn held the title of Vice-President of the company from 1921 to 1927. In 1926 he sponsored a building for YMCA chapter in Kraków, a street in Kraków was named after him. Fenn College was named after him in 1930. A bequest of $100,000 was left to Fenn College, which is now named Cleveland State University. Fenn is buried in the Lake View Cemetery. Fenn was also president of the Cleveland YMCA for 25 years.
