= Robert Henry Mathews =

Australian missionary and sinologist

Robert Henry Mathews (1877–1970) was an Australian missionary and Sinologist, best known for his 1931 A Chinese-English Dictionary: Compiled for the China Inland Mission by R. H. Mathews, which was subsequently revised by Harvard University Press in 1943. He served with the China Inland Mission from 1906, before retiring to Australia in 1945.

== Early life ==
Robert Henry Mathews was born in Flemington, now a suburb of Melbourne, Australia on 13 July 1877, to London-born William Mathews and Australian Mary Mathews, née Whitlaw. Mathews studied lithography at the Working Men's College of Melbourne, during which time he became interested in Christian missionary work. As an fervent Congregationalist, he was drawn to evangelism, especially the China Inland Mission (CIM). Although Mathews set up his own printing business after graduating, he abandoned it to join the CIM in 1906, receiving eighteen months' training in Adelaide where he ministered to the city's outcast poor.

== Missionary in China ==
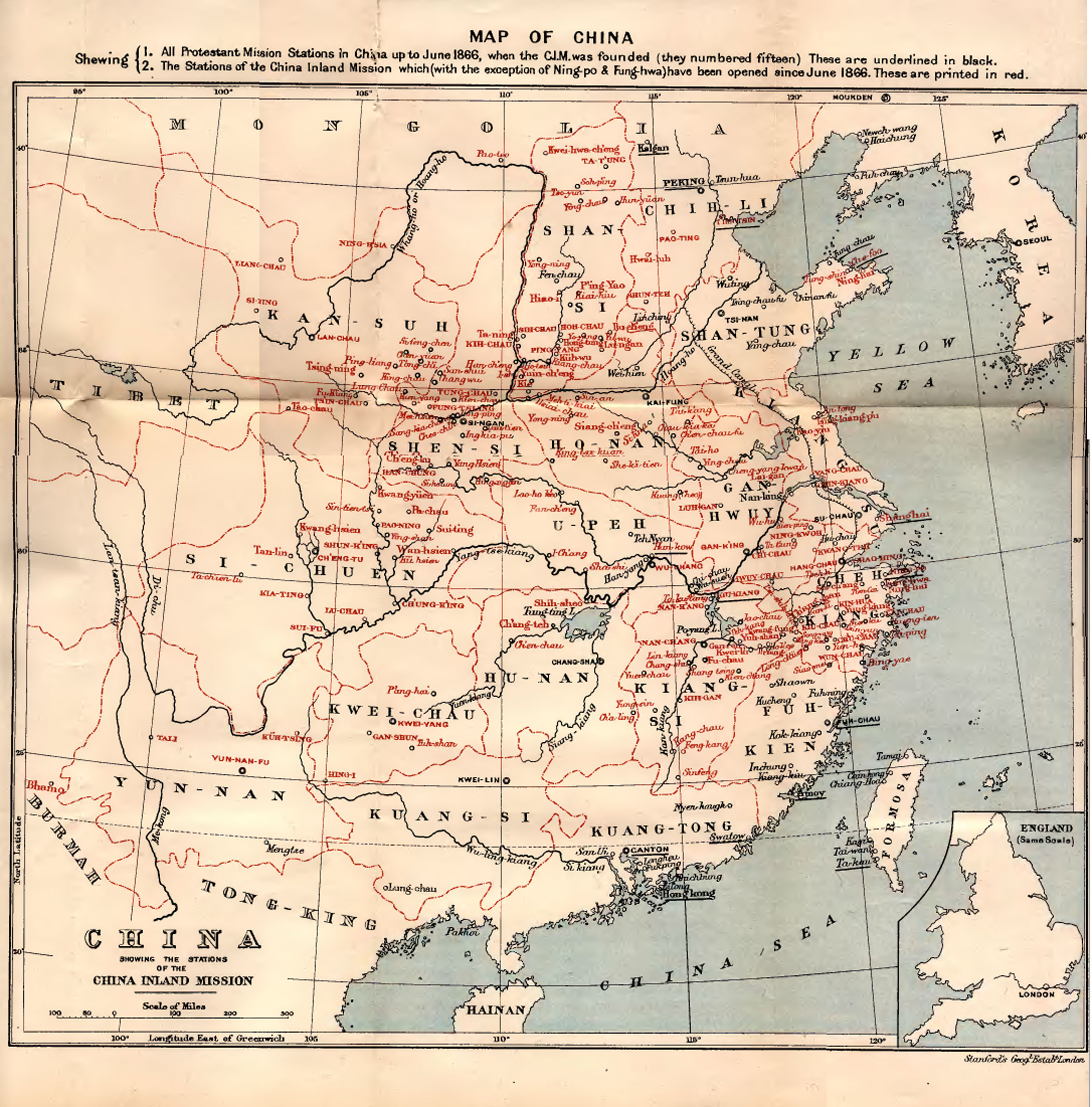
CIM stations in 1902

Mathews left for China on 4 October 1908, stopping at the CIM headquarters in Shanghai for a short period before being despatched to Henan. In 1915 he was transferred to Huizhou (now a district of Huangshan), Anhui, where he is said to have found, as in Henan, "a peculiar lack of response to the Gospel message." Nevertheless, during his time in Anhui, Mathews' interest in the Chinese language deepened due to the variety of dialects he encountered.

In 1921 Mathews returned to Henan, where he led Bible classes for the troops of the warlord Feng Yuxiang, a convert known as "the Christian General", whom the CIM supported. Mathews then travelled around Sichuan for the next four years, leading Bible classes and supervising Chinese seminarians. In 1926, Mathews returned to Melbourne, intending to take a brief holiday. However, the turmoil in China and evacuation of thousands of British missionaries forced him to extend his vacation until February 1928, when he returned to China.

The CIM headquarters, Shanghai

On his return to the CIM Shanghai headquarters, the CIM tasked Mathews with revising F.W. Baller's Analytical Chinese-English Dictionary, first published in 1900. Mathews completed his Chinese-English Dictionary in 1931, a 1200-page volume. The CIM then commissioned Mathews to revise Baller's Mandarin Primer, first published in 1900. Mathews completed the Kuoyü Primer: Progressive Studies in the Chinese National Language in 1938, totalling 790 pages.

In 1937 the Japanese army occupied the Chinese-administered districts of Shanghai. With the outbreak of the Pacific War in 1941, the foreign concessions were occupied, with European and American nationals eventually interned in 1943. In April 1943, Mathews and his wife, Violet, were interned in the Lunghua Civilian Assembly Centre, seven miles southwest of Shanghai. They were held in bleak conditions for two years until the surrender of Japan in August 1945.

== Later life ==
Mathews returned to Melbourne in 1945. Three years later, the Australian Department of Defence engaged him to work on the translation of archival material and the compilation of glossaries. Initially a part-time position, this was extended to a full-time position from 1951. After six years, Mathews retired in 1957. For his linguistic achievement, the University of Melbourne awarded him an honorary Doctor of Letters degree.

Robert Henry Mathews died in Melbourne on 16 February 1970.

== Mathews' Chinese-English Dictionary ==
Beginning as a revision of Baller's Analytical Chinese-English Dictionary, Mathews' Chinese-English Dictionary Compiled for the China Inland Mission is a new and separate work. Writing in 1931, Mathews cites the "rapid changes which have taken place in China," the "influx of modern inventions and the advance of scientific knowledge" as having given rise to new expressions in the thirty years since Baller's dictionary. This made Baller's dictionary out of date, necessitating the compiling of a new dictionary. Mathews included entries for 7,785 Chinese characters with over 104,400 examples drawn from both classical and modern sources. This means the dictionary provides sufficient vocabulary for the generally literate reader while fulfilling its aim to be "at once portable and inexpensive and at the same time sufficiently large". However, Mathews bases some of his definitions on Herbert A. Giles' Chinese-English Dictionary (1892; revised and enlarged 1912) without acknowledgment.

Owing to these advantages, the Harvard–Yenching Institute selected Mathews' dictionary as one of two "practical dictionaries" to revise and reprint in 1943 for "the immediate demands of American students". At this point the supply of Chinese dictionaries had been severely curtailed by the war, leading to an "acute" shortage. The Harvard revision re-titled the dictionary Mathews' Chinese-English Dictionary, and contributes 15,000 correction of errors, revisions of pronunciation and definition, and new entries. In addition, Yuen Ren Chao wrote an introduction on pronunciation. Mathews himself had been working on a revised edition of his dictionary, but when the Japanese occupiers took over the original Shanghai headquarters of the CIM (which had moved headquarters in Shanghai in 1931, and moved to the temporary Republican capital in Chongqing in 1943), unbound copies of Mathews' revision were destroyed, along with printing blocks and the CIM's library.

Nevertheless, the Harvard reprint brought Mathews' dictionary to greater prominence. Today it is known simply as Mathews', and has been considered a great resource for students of classical Chinese, although recent scholarship is beginning to supersede it in this role.

== Personal life ==
Mathews married Anne Ethel Smith, an Australian CIM missionary from New South Wales in Shanghai on 30 December 1908, with whom he had three children. Anne Mathews died in 1920. In 1922 Mathews married Violet Ward, a missionary six years his junior. Violet Mathews closely assisted him in his linguistic work in China and Australia, and was herself a published writer. She died in 1954.

== Works ==
- Mathews, Robert Henry (1931). A Chinese-English Dictionary Compiled for the China Inland Mission. Shanghai: China Inland Mission and Presbyterian Mission Press.
- Mathews, Robert Henry; Baller, Frederick William (1938). Kuoyü Primer: Progressive Studies in the Chinese National Language. Shanghai: China Inland Mission.
- Mathews, Robert Henry (1943). Mathews' Chinese-English Dictionary (Revised American ed.). Cambridge, Massachusetts: Harvard University Press. ISBN 0674123506.
