= The Five Thousand Dictionary =

1926 Chinese-English dictionary

- Front cover of The Five Thousand Dictionary
- Author: Courtenay Hughes Fenn
- Language: Chinese, English
- Publisher: Mission Book Company
- Publication date: 1926, 1942
- Publication place: China
- Media type: print
- Pages: 578, 49
- OCLC: 1671398
- Website: https://archive.org/details/the-five-thousand-dictionary-1926

The Five Thousand Dictionary: A Chinese-English Dictionary... (1926) or Fenn's Chinese-English Pocket-Dictionary (1942), which was compiled by American missionary Courtenay H. Fenn, is a widely reprinted learners' dictionary that selected Chinese character entries on the basis of common usage. It was the first Chinese-English dictionary to indicate the neutral tone associated with weak syllables.

== History ==
Courtenay Hughes Fenn, more commonly known as Courtenay H. Fenn or C.H. Fenn, (1886-1953) was a missionary under the Presbyterian Board of Foreign Missions in China from 1893 to 1925.

Fenn's dictionary was originally intended to be an index of the 5,000 character flashcards used by the North China Union Language School, in the California College in China (later incorporated into Claremont Colleges), Beijing. After compiling the indexing information, Fenn decided to create a pocket dictionary for students of Chinese as a foreign language, and was assisted by Chin Hsien-Tseng. Courtenay H. Fenn's foreword expresses his satisfaction in giving the public a dictionary "the lack of which he has personally felt keenly for the more than thirty years of his sojourn in 'The Land of Sinim'", using the Biblical name Sinim (Hebrew for "inhabitants of the land of sin") that some scholars associate with Greek Sinae "China".

Limiting a Chinese learners' dictionary to 5,000 characters is linguistically sound. Statistical studies of Chinese character usage have shown that an average college-educated Chinese person who is not a specialist in classical literature or history has an active vocabulary of between 3,000 and 4,000 characters. Fenn's dictionary was preceded by William Edward Soothill's The Student's Four Thousand Tzu and General Pocket Dictionary, and Fenn's colleague Hsien-Tseng Chin later compiled The Three Thousand Dictionary of the Chinese Script.

The title of Fenn's dictionary changed through reprinting.

- The Five Thousand Dictionary: A Chinese-English Dictionary and Index to the Character Cards of the College of Chinese Studies, California College in China (1926)
- Fenn's Chinese-English Pocket-Dictionary (1942)
- Chinese-English Pocket-Dictionary (1944)
- The Five Thousand Dictionary: Chinese-English (1973)

The first edition of The Five Thousand Dictionary: A Chinese-English Dictionary and Index to the Character Cards of the College of Chinese Studies, California College in China was printed in 1926 by the Mission Book Company in Shanghai. Demand for this dictionary was ongoing and four subsequent editions were printed. The second (1928), third (1932, introduction by W. B. Pettus), and fourth editions (1936, J. D. Hayes) were unchanged reprints. The fifth edition (1940) was a revision by Chin Hsien-Tseng, who had assisted Fenn with the original edition, and George D. Wilder from the American Board of Commissioners for Foreign Missions. Their preface explains the addition of 150 new phrases, deletion of a few obsolete ones, correction of some errors, and inclusion of two tables: "Chinese Ordinals" and "Standard Methods of Showing Pronunciations, including tones". The first edition of Fenn's dictionary has 578 pages, and the fifth edition has 697.

The revised American edition Fenn's Chinese-English Pocket-Dictionary was published by Harvard University Press in 1942. At the beginning of World War II, the shortage of Chinese and Japanese dictionaries became an urgent matter for English-speaking Allies. The Harvard–Yenching Institute said the need for Chinese dictionaries in America had "grown from chronic to acute", and selected Fenn's The Five Thousand Dictionary (fifth ed., 1940) and A Chinese-English Dictionary: Compiled for the China Inland Mission by R. H. Mathews (1931) as two "practical dictionaries" to revise and reprint—without the authors' permission—for "the immediate demands of American students". Both photolithographic reproductions were retitled: The Five Thousand Dictionary became Fenn's Chinese-English Pocket-Dictionary (1942) and A Chinese-English Dictionary: Compiled for the China Inland Mission by R. H. Mathews became Mathews' Chinese-English Dictionary (1943).

In response to the "urgent need" for publishing the revised Harvard edition, Fenn's dictionary was basically left unchanged. Aside from some minor corrections and additions, the Chinese-American linguist Yuen Ren Chao significantly revised the dictionary's introduction on standards of pronunciation, and marked the neutral tone with dots—the first Chinese-English dictionary to make this phonological distinction. Harvard University Press changed the original title Fenn's Chinese-English Pocket-Dictionary to Chinese-English Pocket-Dictionary for the hardcover edition, and then to The Five Thousand Dictionary: Chinese-English, also in paperback with a redesigned cover that added the characters 字典 (zidian "character dictionary"). Harvard University Press continued reprinting Fenn's and Mathews' popular Chinese-English dictionaries after the war. By 1984, Fenn's dictionary had sold 34,500 hardcover copies and 18,300 paperback copies.

== Content ==
Fenn's Five Thousand Dictionary comprises 5,000 head characters and about 13,000 usage examples of words. The overall collation is by Wade-Giles Romanization, which Fenn says is "not because it is ideal, but simply because its recognition is most nearly universal".

Each dictionary page has six columns. The 1st column of each entry gives the head character, with any variant Chinese characters underneath linked by a line at the left, and the Standard Chinese tone indicated by a superscript ^{1-4} on the character for the 4 tonal categories and a dot before it for the unstressed neutral tone (for example, s.v. nü^{3}, "|⋅兒 a girl" for nǚ'ér (女兒 "daughter; girl").). Most Chinese characters are classified as radical-phonetic characters that combine a semantically indicative "radical" with a phonologically indicative "phonetic". The 2nd column gives the head character's radical with its number in the 214 Kangxi radicals, and the 3rd gives the phonetic with its number in Soothill's dictionary. The 4th column gives English translation equivalents for the character, common words written with it (abbreviated as "|" vertical bar), and indicates whether the character pronunciation is colloquial (俗) or literary (文), and whether it is used as a Classifier (C) or as a Surname (S). The 5th column gives alternate readings of the character, under which the user may find further information. The 6th column roughly indicates how frequently the character is used in Chinese, using the North China Union Language School's arrangement of the 5,000 character flashcards in ten groups of 500 each, lettered from A to K, with A for the 500 most commonly used characters and K for the 500 least commonly used.

The Chinese character 道 (composed of radical 162 辵 or 辶 "walk" and a shǒu 首 "head" phonetic) for dào "way; path; say; the Dao" or dǎo "guide; lead; conduct; instruct; direct" makes a good sample entry for illustrating a dictionary because it has two pronunciations and complex semantics. Fenn's dictionary enters this character under both Tao pronunciations. The primary dào entry gives "道^{4} | 辵 radical 162 | 首 phonetic 855 | Road, way, passage; zone; doctrine; officer; to say | tao^{3} | A"—indicating the 4th "high falling" tone pronunciation, radical, phonetic, translations, alternate dǎo pronunciation, and group A of 500 most commonly used characters—and 15 usage examples, including "|教 doctrine of Taoism" for Dàojiào (道教 "Daoism (as a religion)") and "|理 right principles, doctrine" for dàoli (道理 "reason; rationality; the right way; principle; truth"). The cross-referenced dǎo entry gives "道^{3} | 辵 radical 162 | 首 phonetic 855 | 過|兒 Narrow passage | tao^{3} | A"—indicating the 3rd "low dipping" tone, same radical and phonetic, a guòdàor or (Beijing pronunciation) guòdǎor (過道兒 "passageway; corridor") usage example, alternate dàopronunciation, and same usage frequency group A.
