= Henry Courtenay Fenn =

American sinologist (1894–1978)

- Born: February 26, 1894; Peking, China
- Died: July 22, 1978 (aged 84); Kennett Square, Pennsylvania, U.S.
- Occupation: sinologist
- Known for: architect of Yale University's Chinese language program
- Notable work: "Yale system" of Chinese grammar
- Spouse: Constance Latimer Sargent (m. 1925)
- Children: 4
- Father: Courtenay Hughes Fenn

Henry Courtenay Fenn (February 26, 1894 – July 22, 1978) was an American sinologist and architect of Yale University's Chinese language program.

== Early life ==
Henry Courtenay Fenn was born on February 26, 1894, in Peking (later Beijing), China, to Alice Holstein (née May) and Courtenay Hughes Fenn. His father was a missionary to China and compiler of The Five Thousand Dictionary. He grew up in Peking.

== Career ==
Fenn was active in the "Yale system" of Chinese grammar developed by himself, George Kennedy, Gardner Tewksbury, Wang Fangyu and others working in the Institute of Far Eastern Languages (IFEL) at Yale in the late 1940s. During World War II, he conducted a Chinese program at Yale for the military. He was director of the IFEL from 1952 to 1962. He then became director emeritus.

After his mandatory retirement from Yale, he set up a Chinese language department at Dartmouth College. Starting in 1966, he spent three years at Washington University in St. Louis. At Washington University, he was the acting chairman of the department of Chinese and Japanese from 1966 to 1967. He retired in 1968.

== Selected works ==
- Songs from Hypnia, Henry C. Fenn, 1915
- A Syllabus of the History of Chinese Civilization and Culture, by L. C. Goodrich and H. C. Fenn, 1929, 1941
- Beginning Chinese, by John De Francis, edited by Henry C. Fenn and George A. Kennedy, 1946
- Chinese characters easily confused, Henry C. Fenn, 1953
- Chinese dialogues, edited by Henry C. Fenn & Pao-che`n Lee, 1953
- Speak Mandarin, by Henry C. Fenn and Gardner M. Tewksbury, Yale University Press, New Haven, Conn., 1967
- "Introduction to Chinese Sentence Structure," by Henry C. Fenn, date unknown.

== Personal life ==
Fenn married Constance Latimer Sargent on January 27, 1925. They had four sons, H. Courtenay Fenn, Robert S., David, and Donald L.

Fenn died of a heart attack on July 22, 1978, at Kendall Longwood Retirement Community in Kennett Square, Pennsylvania.
