= Prix Stanislas Julien =

French literary prize

The Prix Stanislas Julien is a prize for a sinological work (usually) published in the previous year. It is named after the French sinologist, Stanislas Julien, and is awarded by the Académie des Inscriptions et Belles-Lettres. The prize was established in 1872 and first awarded in 1875.

== Prize winners ==
1875	James Legge	The Chinese Classics
1876	Marquis d'Hervey de Saint-Denys	Ethnographie des peuples étrangers à la Chine
1877	Paul-Louis-Félix Philastre	Le code annamite: nouvelle traduction complète
1878	Emil Bretschneider	for works relative to the history and geography of Central Asia in the Middle Ages
1879	Willem Vissering	On Chinese Currency and Paper Money
1880	Henri Cordier	Bibliotheca sinica. Dictionnaire bibliographique des ouvrages relatifs à l'Empire chinois
1881	Émile Rocher	La province chinoise du Yun-Nan
1882	O. du Sartel	La Porcelaine de Chine
1883	Maurice Jametel	L'Encre De Chine Son Histoire Et Sa Fabrication
1884	Angelo Zottoli	Cursus litteraturae sinicae neo-missionariis accommodatus
1885	Léon de Rosny	"Kami yo-no maki". Histoire des dynasties divines
1886	Séraphin Couvreur	Dictionnaire chinois-français
1887	Gustaaf Schlegel	Nederlandsch-Chineesch Woordenboek
1888	Jean-Gabriel Devéria	La Frontière Sino-Annamite
1889		No prize awarded.
1890	Abel des Michels	Les Annales Impériales de l'Annam
1891	Sėraphin Couvreur	Dictionnaire chinois-français
1892	Léon de Rosny	Chan-Hai-Cing, antique géographie chinoise
1893	Albert Étienne Jean-Baptiste Terrien de Lacouperie	Catalogue of Chinese Coins from the VIIth Cent. B.C. to A.D. 621
1894	Jan Jakob Maria de Groot; Edouard Chavannes	La code du Mahâyâna en Chine; Mémoire composé à l'époque de la grande dynastie T'ang sur les religieux éminents qui allèrent chercher la loi dans les pays d'Occident
1895	Sėraphin Couvreur	Choix de documents
1896	Maurice Courant	Bibliographie coréenne volumes I and II
1897	Edouard Chavannes	Les Mémoires historiques de Se-Ma Ts'ien volumes I and II
1898	Herbert Giles; Jan Jakob Maria de Groot	A Chinese Biographical Dictionary fascicle 1 The Religious System of China
1899	Pierre Hoang; Ėtienne Zi	Notions techniques sur la propriété en Chine; Pratique des examens militaires en Chine
1900	Camille August Sainson	Mémoires sur l'Annam
1901	Jean Bonet	Dictionnaire annamite-français
1902	Dėsirė Lacroix; Jan Jakob Maria de Groot	Numismatique annamite The Religious System of China volume 4.
1903	Maurice Courant	Catalogue des livres chinois, coréens, japonais de la Bibliothèque Nationale
1904	Louis Gaillard	Nankin d'alors et d'aujourd'hui
1905	Léon Wieger	Rudiments de parler et de style chinois, dialecte de Ho-Kien-Fou
1906	Ėmile Raguet; Ono Tota	Dictionnaire français-japonais
1907	Étienne Aymonier; Antoine Cabaton	Dictionnaire Čam-Francais
1908	Eduard Huber; Alfred Forke	Sutra-lam-kara; Lun-Heng
1909	Aurel Stein	Ancient Khotan
1910	Paul Vial; Stanislas Millot; Joseph Esquirol and Gustave Williatte	Dictionnaire francais-lolo, dialecte gni Dictionnaire des Formes Cursives des Caractères Chinois; Essai de dictionnaire dioi-français reproduisant la langue parlée par les tribus thai de la haute rivière de l'Ouest
1911	Herbert Giles	Chinese English Dictionary 2nd edition, revised and expanded.
1912	F. M. Savina; Henri Doré; Raphael Petrucci	Dictionnaire Tay-Annamite; Recherches sur les superstitions en Chine; Philosophie de la nature dans l'art d'extrême-orient
1913	Maurice Courant; Gaston Cahen	Essai historique sur la musique classique des Chinois; Histoire des relations de la Russie avec la Chine sous Pierre le Grand
1914	Marinus Willem de Visser; Pierre Hoang	The Dragon in China and Japan; Catalogue des tremblements de terre signalés en Chine d'après les sources chinoises.
1915	Maurice Courant	La langue chinoise parlėe
1916	Bernard Karlgren	Études sur la phonologie chinoise
1917	Sekino Tadashi	Album de planches sur les antiquitės de Corėe 朝鮮古蹟図譜
1918	Jérôme Tobar	La Chine et les religions étrangères
1919	Samuel Couling	Encyclopædia Sinica
1920	Marcel Granet	Les fêtes et chansons anciennes de la Chine
1921	Raphael Petrucci	Kiai-Tseu-Yuan Houa Tchouan Encyclopédie de la peinture chinoise
1922	Henri Lamasse; C.A.S Williams	Sin Kouo Wen ou Nouveau manuel de la langue chinoise A Manual of Chinese Metaphor
1925	Guy Boulais	Manuel de code chinois
1926	Marcel Granet	Danses et lėgendes de la Chine ancienne
1927	Johan Gunnar Andersson	Preliminary Reports on Archaeological Research in Kansu
1928	Henri Maspero	La Chine antique
1929	Takakusu Junjiro	Taishō shinshū Daizōkyō 大正新脩大蔵経
1930	René Grousset	Histoire de l'Extrême-Orient
1931	Arthur Christopher Moule	Christians in China
1932	Academia Sinica, Institute of History and Archaeology	Bulletin and associated publications, in particular the excavation reports of Anyang
1934	Anastasius van den Wyngaert	Sinica Franciscana volumes I and II
1935	Louis de La Vallée-Poussin ed.	Mélanges chinois et bouddhiques
1936	Wang Ts'ing-jou	for publications on the Xixia language
1937	William Hung	Index of the Harvard-Yenching edition of the Li Chi
1938	Paul Ratchnevsky	Un code des Yuan
1939	René Grousset	L'Empire des Steppes
1946	Étienne Lamotte	Le Traité de la grande vertu de sagesse de Nāgārjuna
1947	Homer H. Dubs	History of the Former Han Dynasty
1948	Josef Franz Karl Rock	Studies in Na-khi literature The romance of K'a-mä-gyu-mi-gkyi
1949	Feng Youlan	Xin Yuandao 新原道
1950	Arthur Waley	Life and Times of Po Chũ-i 772-846
1951	Tjan Tjoe Som	Po Hu T'ung: the Comprehensive Discussions in the White Tiger Hall
1952	Haneda Toru	for his scholarship and to mark the publication of a festschrift in his honor
1953	Francis Cleaves	Sino-Mongolian Inscriptions of 1346 and for his body of work in Sino-Mongolian philology
1954	Étienne Balazs	Études sur la société et l'économie de la Chine médiévale
1955	Herbert Franke	Sinologie
1957	Edwin O. Reischauer	Ennin's Diary and Ennin's Travels in China awarded in the form of a medal
1959	Louis-Charles Damais	for studies of Indonesian epigraphy
1962	Jao Tsung-i	Yindai zhenbu renwu tongkao awarded in the form of a medal
1963	David Hawkes	Ch'u Tz'u: the Songs of the South, an Ancient Chinese Anthology
1965	Institute of Oriental Studies of the Russian Academy of Sciences	Inventaire et la publication des manuscrits chinois de Touen-Houang
1967	David Nivison	The Life and Thought of Chang Hsüeh-ch'eng
1968		No prize awarded
1969	Kôjirô Yoshikawa	for the entire body of his work
1970		No prize awarded
1971	Pierre Ryckmans	La vie et l'oeuvre de Su Renshan, rebelle, peintre et fou
1972	Akira Fujieda	Moji no bunkashi 文字の文化史
1973	Joseph Needham	Science and Civilisation in China
1974	Pan Chung-Kweï	Yingya Dunhuang yunji xinbian 瀛涯敦煌韻輯新編 and his studies and textual criticisms of the Chinese Dunhuang manuscripts
1975	Chang Hsin-Chang	Chinese Literature: Popular Fiction and Drama
1976	Olga Lazarevna Fishman	Notes intitulėes Multum in parvo, par Ki-Yun, ėcrivain chinois (1724-1796)
1977	L. Carrington Goodrich	Dictionary of Ming Biography (1368-1644)
1978	Miyazaki Ichisada	Essais sur l'histoire de l'Asie
1979	A. C. Graham	Later Mohist Logic
1980	Léon Vandermeersch	Wangdao ou la Voie royale vol. I
1981	Eleonora Nowgorodowa	Alte Kunst der Mongolei
1982	Jean-Claude Martzloff	Recherches sur l'œuvre mathématique de Méi Wéndǐng, 1633-1721
1983	Martine Vallette-Hémery	Yuan Hongdao, 1568-1610 : théorie et pratique littéraires
1984	Liu Pak-Yuen	Les Institutions politiques et la lutte pour le pouvoir au milieu de la dynastie des Han antérieurs
1985	Kristofer Schipper	Le corps taoïste : corps physique, corps social
1986	Charlotte Von Verschuer	Les relations officielles du Japon avec la Chine aux vIIIe et ixe siècles
1987	Dietrich Seckel	Buddhistische Tempelnamen in Japan
1988	Lucie Rault-Leyrat	La cithare chinoise zheng
1989	Alain Peyraube	Syntaxe diachronique du chinois
1990	Jean François Billeter	L'Art chinois de l'écriture
1991	Christine Mollier	Une apocalypse taoïste du Ve siècle : le Livre des incantations divines des grottes abyssales
1992	André Bareau	En suivant Bouddha
1993	Jacques Dars	La Marine chinoise du Xe siècle au XIVe siècle
1994	Baoyun Yang	Contribution à l'histoire de la principauté des Nguyên au Vietnam méridional : 1600-1775
1995	Kuo Li-Ying	Confession et contrition dans le bouddhisme chinois du Ve au Xe siècl
1996	Éric Trombert	Le crédit à Dunhuang: vie matérielle et société en Chine médiévale
1997	Françoise Bottéro	Sémantisme et classification dans l'écriture chinoise: les systèmes de classement des caractères par clés du Shuowen Jiezi au Kangxi Zidian
1998	Anne Cheng	Histoire de la pensée chinoise
1999	Elfriede Regina Knauer	The Camel's Load in Life and Death
2000	Robert Hegel	Reading Illustrated Fiction in Late Imperial China
2001	Ll Xiaohong	Céleste Dragon. - Genèse de l'iconographie du dragon chinois
2002	Marianne Bujard	Le Sacrifice au Ciel dans la Chine ancienne. Théorie et pratique sous les Han occidentaux
2003	Michela Bussotti	Gravures de Hui, étude du livre illustré chinois du 16e siècle à la première moitié du 17e siècle
2004	Christian Lamouroux	Fiscalité, comptes publics et politiques financières dans la Chine des Song. – Le chapitre 179 du Songshi
2005	Mark Elvin	The Retreat of the Elephants: an Environmental History of China
2006	François Lachaud	La jeune fille et la mort
2007	Stephen Teiser	Reinventing the Wheel: Paintings of Rebirth in Medieval Buddhist Temples
2008	Christine Mollier	Buddhism and Taoism Face to Face: Scripture, Ritual, and Iconographic Exchange in Medieval China
2009	Mark Edward Lewis	The Early Chinese Empires: Qin and Han
2010	James Robson	Power of Place: The Religious Landscape of the Southern Sacred Peak (Nanyue 南嶽) in Medieval China
2011	Rafe de Crespigny	Imperial Warlord : A Biography of Cao Cao, 155-220 AD
2012	Pierre Marsone	La Steppe et l’Empire. La formation de la dynastie Khitan (Liao), IVe-Xe siècles
2013	Li Fanwen	XiXia-Chinese Dictionary
2014	Endymion Wilkinson	Chinese History: A New Manual
2015	Koichi Shinohara	Spells, Images, and Mandalas: Tracing the Evolution of Esoteric Buddhist Rituals
2016	Michel Vieillard-Baron	Recueil des joyaux d’or (Kingyoku wakashu)
2017	Terry Frederick Kleeman	Celestial Masters : History and Ritual in Early Daoist Communities Awarded in the form of a medal.
2018	Patrick Wertmann	Sogdians in China Awarded in the form of a medal.
2019	Jean Levi	Les deux arbres de la Voie, Les entretiens de Confucius et Le Livre de Lao-Tseu Awarded in the form of a medal.
2020	Stephen Owen	Just a Song: Chinese Lyrics from the Eleventh and Early Twelfth Centuries
2021	Frédéric Constant	Le droit mongol dans l’État impérial sino-mandchou (1644-1911), entre autonomie et assimilation. Awarded in the form of a medal.
2022	Robert Ford Campany	The Chinese Dreamscape, 300 BCE - 800 CE. Awarded in the form of a medal.
2023	Catherine Despeux	For her translation of Classique du Thé . Awarded in the form of a medal.
2024	Siyan Jin	Awarded in the form of a medal for her work La poétique de Liu Xie: une histoire littéraire de la Chine ancienne. Published as a complement to the translation by Siyan Jin and Leon Vandermeersch titled, L’esprit de la littérature ciseleur de dragons.
2025	Romain Graziani	Les Lois et les Nombres. Essais sur les ressorts de la culture politique chinoise Awarded as a medal.
2026	Lü Pengzhi	For their work La liturgie du taoïsme médiéval. Awarded in the form of a medal.

== See also ==
- Prix Giles, awarded biennially for a work related to China, Japan or East Asia that was published in the previous two years by a French author
