= Prix Giles =

The Prix Giles (also known as the Prix Hérbert Allen Giles) is awarded biennially for a work related to China, Japan or East Asia that was published in the previous two years by a French author. It is named after the British sinologist Herbert Giles, and is awarded by the Académie des Inscriptions et Belles-Lettres. The prize was established in 1917 and was funded by Herbert Giles himself. The first award was given in 1919.

== Prize winners ==
1919	Georges Maspero; André Silvestre	Partial award for Grammaire de la langue Khmère; Partial award for 'Les Thais blancs de Phong-Tho'
1921	Léopold de Saussure	For his work on Chinese astronomy
1923	Gabriel Ferrand	L'Empire sumatranais de Çrîvijaya
1925	François-Marie Savina	Dictionnaire étymologique français-nung -chinois
1927	Émile Licent	Dix Annees (1916-1923) dans la bassin du Fleuve Jaune et autres tributaires du Golfe du Pei Tcheu Ly
1929	Jean-Marie Martin	Le shintoïsme religion nationale
1931	Jules Sion; Victor Barbier	1200 francs were awarded to Jules Sion for L'asie moussons. Victor Barbier received 300 francs and a mention for his Dictionnaire classique annamite-français et français-annamite.
1933	M.A. Roland-Cabaton	For her index to Henri Cordier's Bibliotheca Indosinica
1935	Victor Goloubew	For his work on the archaeology of the Far East, especially for his work on the site of Angkor
1937	Paul Mus	For his work on Indochinese architecture.
1939	René Grousset	L'empire des steppes
1941		No prize awarded this year
1943		No prize awarded this year
1945		No prize awarded this year
1946	Georges Coedès	Histoire ancienne des États hindouisés d'Extrême-Orient
1947	Pierre Daudin	Vécrin des gemmes en quatre caractères
1949	Robert des Rotours	Traité des fonctionnaires et traité de l'armée, traduits de la nouvelle histoire des T'ang
1951	Henri Deydier	For his contributions to the study of Gandharan art
1953	Charles Haguenauer	La morphologie du japonais moderne
1955	Marcelle Lalou	For her Bibliographie bouddhique volumes xxi, xxii and xxiii
1957	Jacques Gernet	Les aspects économiques du Bouddhisme dans la société chinoise du Ve au xe siècle
1959	Kanda Kiichiro	On the occasion of his sixtieth birthday
1961	Maurice Durand	Techniques et panthéons des médiums vietnamiens and Imagerie populaire vietnamienne
1963	Louis Hambis	For his editorship of Oeuvres posthumes de Paul Pelliot
1965	Louis Malleret; Yves Hervouet	L'archéologie du delta du Mékong; Un poète de cour sous les Han : Sseu-Ma Siang-Jou
1969	Pierre Diény	Aux origines de la poésie classique en Chine, étude sur la poésie lyrique à l'époque des Han
1971	Hubert Maës	Hiraga Gennai et son temps
1973	Claudine Lombard-Salmon	Un exemple d'acculturation chinoise: La province du Gui Zhou au XVIIIe siècle
1975	André Lévy	Le conte en langue vulgaire du XVIIe siècle : vogue et déclin d'un genre narratif de la littérature chinoise
1977	Donald Holzman	Poetry and Politics: The Life and Poetry of Juan Chi
1979	Jacques Dars	For his translation, Au bord de l'eau
1981	Pierre-Étienne Will	Bureaucratie et famine en Chine au XVIIIe siècle
1983	Jacqueline Pigeot	Michiyuki-bun. Poétique de l'itinéraire dans la littérature du Japon ancien
1985	Hartmut O. Rotermund	Pèlerinage aux neuf sommets. Carnet de route d'un religieux itinérant dans le Japon du XIX^{e} siècle
1987	Kwong Hin Foon	Wang Zhaojun. Une héroïne chinoise de l'histoire à la légende
1989		No prize awarded this year
1991	Kamaleswar Bhattacharya	The dialectical method of Nâgârjuna (Vigrahavyâvartani)
1993		No prize awarded this year
1995	Jean-Marie Lafont	La présence française dans le royaume sikh du Penjab, 1822-1849
1997	Nicolas Fiévé	L'architecture et la ville au Japon ancien. Espace architectural de la ville de Kyoto et des résidences shogunales aux XIVe et XV siècles
1999	Frédéric Obringer	L'aconit et l'orpiment. Drogues et poisons en Chine ancienne et médiévale
2001	Jean-François Soum	Nakae Toju (1608-1648) et Kumazawa Banzan (1619-1691), deux penseurs de l'époque d'Edo
2003	Étienne de La Vaissière	Histoire des marchands sogdiens
2005	Isabelle Landry-Deron	La preuve par la Chine. La « Description » de J.-B. Du Halde, Jésuite, 1735
2007	Vincent Goossaert	L'interdit du boeuf en Chine. Agriculture, éthique et sacrifice
2009	Michèle Pirazzoli-t'Serstevens	Giuseppe Castiglione : 1688-1766. Peintre et architecte à la cour de Chine
2013	Damien Chaussende	Des Trois royaumes aux Jin. Légitimation du pouvoir impérial en Chine au IIIe siècle
2015	Daniela Campo	La construction de la sainteté dans la Chine moderne : la vie du maître bouddhiste Xuyun
2017	Jean-Pierre Drège	Le papier dans la Chine impériale. Origines, fabrication, usages
2019	Michael Lucken	Le Japon grec. Culture et possession
2021	Pierre-Étienne Will	Handbooks and Anthologies for Officials in Imperial China. Awarded in the form of a medal.
2023	Michel Vieillard-Baron	For his translation of Kokin waka shû – Recueil de poèmes japonais d'hier et d'aujourd'hui
2025	Pierre-Emmanuel Roux	For his work Au tribunal du repentir. La proscription du catholicisme en Chine (1724-1860) Awarded in the form of a medal.

== See also ==
- Prix Stanislas Julien, awarded annually for a sinological work usually published in the previous year
