= Rault =

Rault is a surname that may refer to:

- Didier Rault (born 1968), Founder and Chairman of International Finance Capital
- Lucie Rault (born 1944), French ethnomusicologist
- Yves Rault (1958–1997), French pianist
- Jeb Rault (born 1971), American guitarist, singer, songwriter
