= The Weiqi Devil =

- Short story by Pu Songling
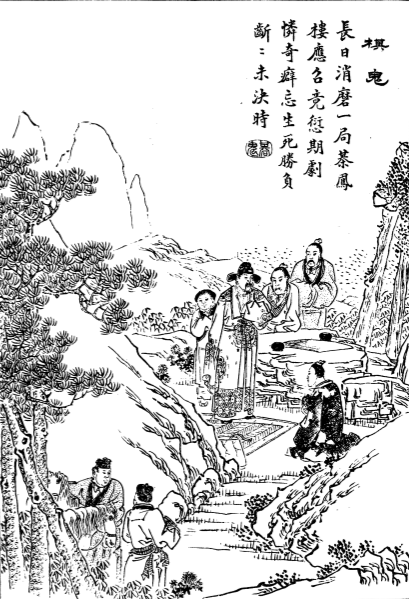
- 19th-century illustration from Xiangzhu liaozhai zhiyi tuyong (Liaozhai Zhiyi with commentary and illustrations; 1886)
- Original title: 棋鬼 (Qigui)
- Translator: Herbert Giles
- Country: China
- Language: Chinese
- Genre(s): Chuanqi

Publication
- Published in: Strange Stories from a Chinese Studio
- Publication type: Anthology
- Publication date: c. 1740

Chronology
| The Miniature Hunting Dog (小猎犬) | (辛十四娘) |

The Weiqi Devil, also known as The Chess Ghost, (Chinese: 棋鬼; pinyin: Qíguǐ) is a short story by Qing dynasty writer Pu Songling, collected in Strange Tales from a Chinese Studio (Liaozhai; 1740). It pertains to a Chinese general's encounter with the titular "weiqi devil". The story was first translated into English by Herbert Giles in his 1878 translation of Liaozhai.

== Plot ==
A General Liang is enjoying a public holiday at his residence. Halfway into his game of weiqi with a peer, a dishevelled-looking passer-by appears and begins observing the game intently. Courteous but aloof, the stranger initially declines the general's game request but ultimately gives in, only to lose. At this point the stranger has become immersed in the game, and he continues to playing with the general and his mates.

Towards the end of one match, the stranger is suddenly terrified and begs for General Liang's rescue; upon enquiry, he reveals that the general's gardener, Ma Cheng, is out to get him. Without warning, however, the stranger is vanquished. The general deduces that he was a ghost and presses Ma Cheng for details. Ma, who had been possessed by an underling from Hell, elaborates that the stranger was an unfilial scholar – a weiqi addict who lost massive amounts of money gambling on the game so much so that his father died of sorrow.

For seven years, the scholar was cursed to be a hungry devil. The sentence had already ended when the general met him, but the "weiqi devil" failed to complete his final task, that is to promptly inscribe verses on the stone facade of the Phoenix Tower, a complex in Hell. With that, the ghost sealed his fate – condemnation to the deepest regions of the Netherworld, without any chance of rebirth. Liang laments that "men are ruined by any inordinate passion". (Note: In Chinese: "癖之误 人也，如是夫！")
