= Pierre Marsone =

French sinologist

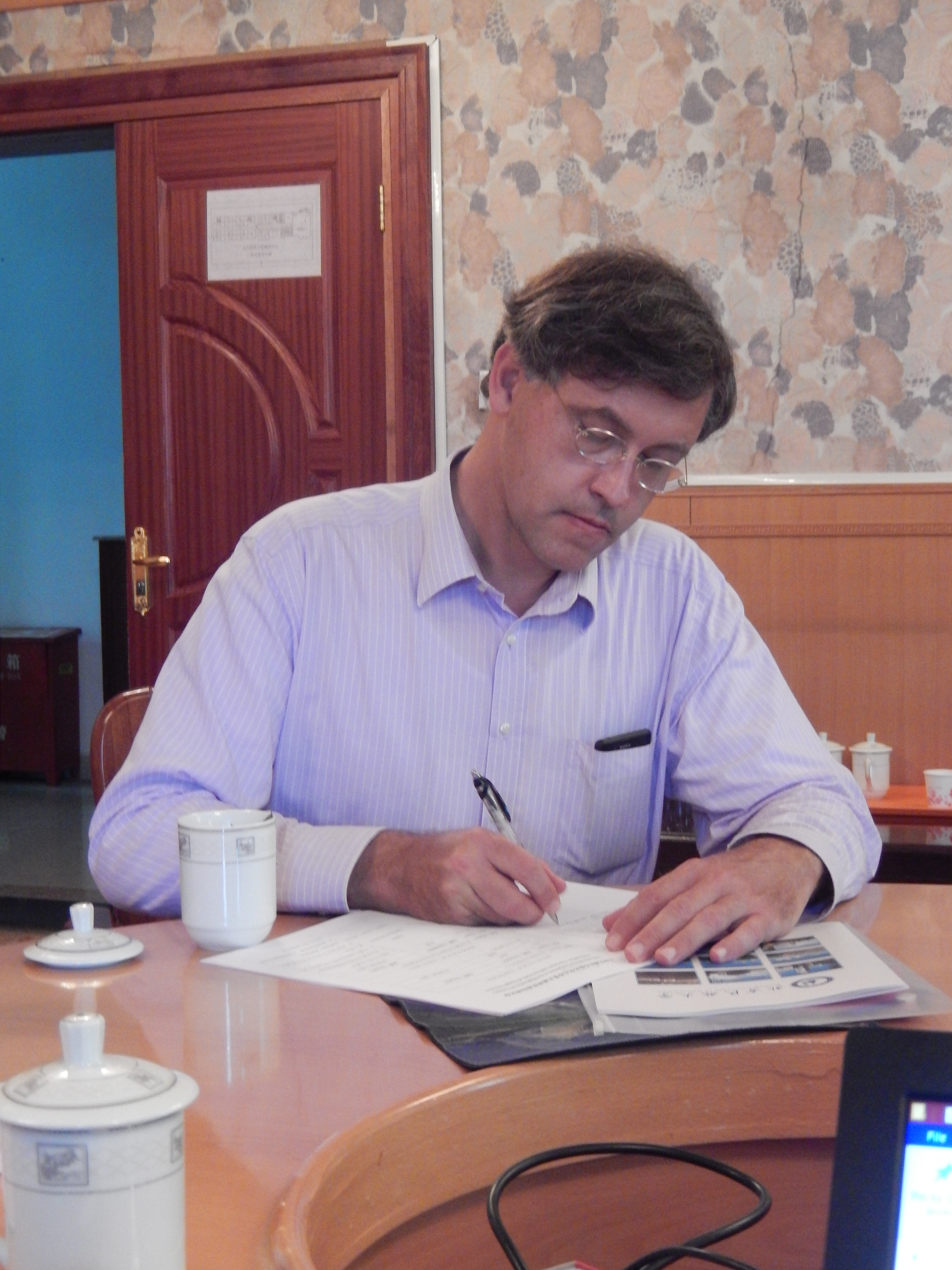
Pierre Marsone at a conference in Yinchuan, China, 20 August 2016

Pierre Marsone is a French sinologist. He is Directeur d'études (Professor) at the Department of Historical Sciences and Philology of the École Pratique des Hautes Études (EPHE) in Paris, France. His principal fields of research are the political and religious history of China, including the Khitan Liao dynasty, the Jurchen Jin dynasty and Mongolian Yuan dynasty; the Quanzhen School of Taoism, Japanese Zen Buddhism, and the semantic analysis of Chinese.

In June 2012, Pierre Marsone received from the Académie des Inscriptions et Belles-Lettres the Prix Stanislas Julien for his book La Steppe et l’Empire (Les Belles Lettres, 2011).

== Biography ==
After graduate studies in philosophy, Chinese and Japanese, Pierre Marsone undertook his PhD research under the direction of Pr Kristofer Schipper in 1995 at the École pratique des Hautes Etudes (Sorbonne, Paris). From 1996 to 1998, he received a research grant from the French government, and then the research grant from the Chiang Ching-Kuo foundation (1998-1999). From 1999 to 2002, he has been teaching Chinese as a professeur agrégé in high schools of Paris. In 2001, he published the annotated translation of the Kôzen gokoku ron (Treatise of the instauration of Zen for Protecting the State) written by Japanese monk Eisai around 1198. The same year, he also defensed his doctoral dissertation, entitled "Wang Chongyang and the foundation of the Taoist Quanzhen movement". In 2002, Pierre Marsone was elected assistant professor at the Section of History and Philology of the École pratique des hautes Etudes. He also taught at Paris 12 Val de Marne University in Creteil (2001-2006) and at Institut national des langues et civilisations orientales (2004-2007). He passed the habilitation in 2009 and was elected Directeur d’études (full professor) at the Ecole Pratique des hautes Etudes in 2012. Since 2002, his teaching and research focus on the history, society and religion of the Liao Jin Yuan period (10th to 14th centuries).

== Selected works ==
Books

- 2002. Aux origines du Zen, édition bilingue, commentée et annotée, du Kōzen gokoku ron 興禪護國論 de Eisai (1143–1215). Paris, Éditions You-feng.
- 2010. Wang Chongyang et la fondation du Quanzhen : ascètes taoïstes et alchimie intérieure. Coll. Mémoires de l’Institut des Hautes Études chinoises, vol. XL. Paris, Collège de France.
- 2011. La Steppe et l’Empire : la formation de la dynastie Khitan (Liao). Paris, Les Belles-Lettres.

Editor

- 2013. (with Jean-Noël Robert) "Les Astres et le Destin : astrologie et divination en Asie Orientale", Extrême-Orient Extrême-Occident, n° 35.
- 2014. (with John Lagerwey) Modern Chinese Religion I (Song-Liao-Jin-Yuan, 960-1368 AD). Leiden, Brill, 2 vol.
- 2015. (with Pier Giorgio Borbone) Le christianisme syriaque en Asie centrale et en Chine. Paris, Geuthner.

Articles

- 2009. "When was the Temple of the Cross at Fangshan a 'Christian temple'?"; Li Tang et Dietmar W. Winkler dir.,Hidden Treasures and Intercultural Encounters : Studies on East Syriac Christianity in China and Central Asia, Berlin – Vienne, Lit Verlag, 2009, pp. 215–223.
- 2009. "La fondation de l’ordre monastique taoïste Quanzhen et celle de l’ordre des Franciscains : un faisceau de coincidences"; Des moines et des moniales dans le monde. La vie monastique dans le miroir de la parenté, Chapter V. Paris, L’Harmattan, 2009.
- 2010. "Fondateurs d’ordres monastiques : quand l’histoire s’amuse"; Religions et Histoire, hors-série No. 3, 2010, pp. 30–31.
- 2010. "Vers 140 : Fondation de l’Eglise des maîtres célestes"; Sciences Humaines, hors-série No. 12, Nov.–Dec. 2010, pp. 30–31.
- 2011. "Alghun Shari (Aluhun Sali 阿魯渾薩理, 1245-1307) : a Uyghur at the head of the administration in China", Control and Management in Arid and Semi-arid Zones, Paris, Hermann, 2011, pp. 295–304.
- 2012. "Le Ciel des Khitan", Journal asiatique, vol. 300, 2012–2, pp. 797-822.
- 2012. "The contribution of the latest decipherment of Khitan scripts for the history of the Khitan-Liao dynasty" [契丹文字的最新解讀對契丹遼朝歷史的貢獻], Shoujie Zhongguo shaoshu minzu guji wenxian guoji xueshu yantaohui lunwenji 首届中國少数民族古籍文献國際學術研討會論文集 (Proceedings of the 1st International Colloquium on Ancient Manuscripts and Literatures of the Minorities in China), Peking, Minzu chubanshe, 2012, pp. 171–178.
- 2012. "Les Châtiments dans l’empire khitan (Liao 遼, 907-1125)", Publications de l’IPOA du Collège de France, vol. X, 2012, pp. 217–239.
- 2013. "Khubilai ou la Chine sous tutelle", L’Histoire, « Les Mongols, le plus grand empire du monde », 2013, pp. 58–63.
- 2013. "Two portraits for one man : George, king of the Önggüt", Li Tang et Dietmar W. Winkler dir., From the Oxus River to the Chinese Shores : Studies on East Christianity in China and Central Asia, Zürich Berlin, LIT, 2013, pp. 225–236.
- 2013. "Quanzhenjiao de chuangli : shenzhuan yu lishi" 全真教的創立：神傳與歷史, Duochong shiye xia de Xifang Quanzhenjiao yanjiu 多重視野下的西方全真教研究 [Researches on Quanzhen Daoism from Western Perspectives], Zhang Guangbao 張廣保 and Song Xueli 宋學立 dir., Qi Lu shushe, 2013, pp. 53–77.
- 2014. "Daoism during the Jin dynasty", Modern Chinese Religion I Song-Liao-Jin-Yuan, J. Lagerwey et P. Marsone dir., Leiden Boston, Brill, 2014, vol. 2, pp. 1111–1159.
- 2015. "Les Önggüt 汪古, chrétiens en Mongolie Intérieure", Migrations de langues et d'idées en Asie, Jean-Louis Bacqué-Grammont, Pierre-Sylvain Filliozat et Michel Zink dir., Paris, AIBL, 2015, pp. 149–159.
- 2016. "The Dongtian/Fudi and the sacred places of the emerging Quanzhen Daoism", Dōkyō no seichi to chihōshin 道教の聖地と地方神, Tuchiya Masaaki et Vincent Goossaert éd., Tokyo, Tōhō shoten, 2016, p. 161-171.
