= Simplified Wade =

Simplified Wade, abbreviated SW, is a modification of the Wade–Giles romanization system for writing Standard Mandarin Chinese. It was devised by the Swedish linguist Olov Bertil Anderson (1920–1993), who first published the system in 1969. Simplified Wade uses tonal spelling: in other words it modifies the letters in a syllable in order to indicate tone differences. It is one of only two Mandarin romanization systems that indicate tones in such a way (the other being Gwoyeu Romatzyh). All other systems use diacritics or numbers to indicate tone.

== Initials ==
One of the important changes that Anderson made to Wade–Giles to was to replace the apostrophe following aspirated consonants with an ⟨h⟩. (Note: The IPA also indicates aspiration with a (superscript) ^{h}.) This modification, previously used in the Legge romanization, was also adopted by Joseph Needham in his Science and Civilisation in China series. The table below illustrates the spelling difference.

Wade– Giles	Simplified Wade	Hànyǔ Pīnyīn	IPA
pʻ	ph	p	pʰ
tʻ	th	t	tʰ
kʻ	kh	k	kʰ
chʻ	chh	q	tɕʰ
chʻ	chh	ch	tʂʰ
tsʻ	tsh	c	tsʰ
tzʻ	tsh	c	tsʰ

While Wade–Giles spells the initials differently before the vowel [ɹ̩] (written ŭ in WG but y in SW), Simplified Wade spells them the same as everywhere else:

Wade– Giles	Simplified Wade
tzŭ but tsu, tsang, etc.	tsy like tsu, tsang, etc.
tzʻŭ but tsʻu, tsʻang, etc.	tshy like tshu, tshang, etc.
ssŭ but su, sang, etc.	sy like su, sang, etc.

Like most romanization systems for Standard Mandarin, Simplified Wade uses r for Wade–Giles j: WG jih, jê, jên, jêng, jo, jui, jung, etc., become SW ry, re, ren, reng, ro, ruei, rung, etc.

All other initials are the same as in Wade–Giles.

== Finals ==
The finals of Simplified Wade differ from those of Wade–Giles in the following ways:

- An -h at the end of a Wade–Giles final is dropped in Simplified Wade: WG -ieh, yeh, -üeh, yüeh, êrh become SW -ie, ye, -üe (but see below), yüe (but see below), er.
- A circumflex in a Wade–Giles final is dropped in Simplified Wade: WG ê, -ên, wên, -êng, wêng, êrh become SW e, -en, wen, -eng, weng, er.
- The Wade–Giles ê/o final is always e in Simplified Wade: for Wade–Giles ko, kʻo, ho; ê or o; tê, tʻê, chê, chʻê, tsê, tsʻê, jê, etc., Simplified Wade has ke, khe, he; e; te, the, che, chhe, tse, tshe, re, etc.
- The Wade–Giles ui/uei final is always uei in Simplified Wade (except when it forms a syllable on its own; then it is wei in both WG and SW). Wade–Giles writes kuei and kʻuei but otherwise -ui (hui, shui, jui, etc.), while Simplified Wade writes not only kuei and khuei but also huei, shuei, ruei, etc.
- While Wade–Giles writes the syllable [i] as i or yi depending on the character, Simplified Wade consistently uses yi.
- Like Gwoyeu Romatzyh, Simplified Wade uses -y for Wade–Giles -ih and -ŭ: WG chih, chʻih, shih, jih, tzŭ, tzʻŭ, ssŭ become SW chy, chhy, shy, ry, tsy, tshy, sy.

=== Equivalents of Wade–Giles ü ===
When ü is available, it is used as in Wade–Giles. Otherwise, the following rules apply:

- The Wade–Giles syllable yu becomes you and WG yü becomes yu: WG yu, yü, yüeh, yüan, yün become you, yu, yue, yuan, yun (yung remains yung).
- Wade–Giles hsü becomes hsu or hsyu: WG hsüeh becomes hsue or hsyue; WG hsüan becomes hsuan or hsyuan; WG hsün becomes hsun or hsyun; WG hsü becomes hsu or hsyu.
- In all other cases, Wade–Giles ü becomes yu, e.g., nyu, lyue, chyu, chyun, chhyu, chhyue, chhyuan.

== Tones ==
Both Gwoyeu Romatzyh and Simplified Wade use tonal spelling, but in two very different fashions. In Gwoyeu Romatzyh, the spelling of the tone and the spelling of the final often fuse together: WG -iao has the basic spelling -iau in GR, which becomes -yau in the 2nd tone, -eau in the 3rd tone, -iaw in the 4th tone, and remains -iau in the 1st tone – hence WG chiao^{1}, chiao^{2}, chiao^{3}, chiao^{4} become GR jiau, jyau, jeau, jiaw. There are different rules for different cases: WG pʻin^{1}, pʻin^{2}, pʻin^{3}, pʻin^{4} become GR pin, pyn, piin, pinn, but WG sui^{1}, sui^{2}, sui^{3}, sui^{4} become GR suei, swei, soei, suey.

In Simplified Wade, on the other hand, the 2nd, 3rd and 4th tones are always indicated by an otherwise silent letter following the final: -v for the 2nd tone, -x for the 3rd tone, and -z for the 4th tone. The spelling of the tone and the spelling of the final are always separable from each other. Simplified Wade's tonal spelling is therefore similar to the adding of a digit at the end of the syllable.

The 1st tone is always indicated by the absence of a letter following the final. Examples:

First tone	Second tone	Third tone	Fourth tone
ma	mav	max	maz
chiao	chiaov	chiaox	chiaoz
phin	phinv	phinx	phinz
suei	sueiv	sueix	sueiz

When a vertical apostrophe is used above one or more syllables, any syllable without a vertical apostrophe carries the neutral tone: Hànyǔ Pīnyīn lái le is la̍iv-le in Simplified Wade.

== The right apostrophe ==
A right apostrophe is used to indicate a syllable break in an otherwise ambiguous spelling, e.g., piʼaox for WG pi^{1}-ao^{3}, freeing up the spelling piaox to unambiguously mean WG piao^{3}. Due to the tone letters, this is only needed when the first syllable carries tone 1.

== See also ==
- Wade–Giles
- Wade–Giles table
- Comparison of Chinese transcription systems
- Spelling in Gwoyeu Romatzyh

== Bibliography ==
- Anderson, Olov Bertil (1970). A Concordance to Five Systems of Transcription for Standard Chinese. Lund: Studentlitteratur.
- Anderson, Olov Bertil (1973). Konkordans till fem transkriptionssystem för kinesiskt riksspråk. Lund: Studentlitteratur.
- Malmqvist, N. G. D. (2011). Bernhard Karlgren: Portrait of a Scholar. Bethlehem, Pennsylvania: Lehigh University Press.
