= Maurice Durand =

Maurice Durand may refer to:

- Maurice Durand (architect)
- Maurice Durand (linguist)
