= Léon Wieger =

French Jesuit, physician, and sinologist (1856–1933)

Léon Wieger (born 9 July 1856 in Strasbourg, France - died 25 March 1933 in Xian County, Hebei, China), was a French Jesuit missionary, medical doctor, theologist and sinologist who worked at the Catholic Jesuit mission in Hejian, together with Séraphin Couvreur.

He joined the Jesuits in 1881 and was ordained in 1887, travelling to Chihli (Hebei) a few months later.

He published numerous books on Chinese culture, Taoism, Buddhism and the Chinese language. He also wrote a ten-volume history of China and won the Prix Stanislas Julien three times.

== Books ==
- Wieger, Léon, 1856-1933: Chinese Characters: Their Origin, Etymology, History, Classification And Signification (2 volumes; Hejian: Catholic Mission Press, 1915), trans. by L. Davrout
- Histoire de croyances religieuses (History of the Religious Beliefs)
