= Angelo Zottoli =

Angelo Zottoli (Chao Deli 晁德蒞; 1826–1902) was an Italian Catholic priest and missionary in China and a sinologist.

== Biography ==
Zottoli was born in Acerno on June 21, 1826, and joined the Jesuits in 1843. In Naples he studied theology and philosophy, and his work as a teacher was greatly appreciated by his religious brothers. He then went as a missionary to China in 1848.

From 1853 he taught, and was headmaster, at the St. Ignatius College for Chinese Christian students founded in 1849.

He was known for his sinological works and was an important leader in the Shanghai Catholic community of Zikawei, encouraging figures such as Ma Xiangbo to carefully study the Chinese and Western classics. During his stay in Zikawei, he also provided insights into the political, ritual and religious aspects of Chinese culture.

== Sinology ==
Zottoli produced a Latin textbook of the Chinese language, Cursus litteraturae Sinicae neo-missionariis accommodatus, in five volumes in octavo. He also produced Latin translations of some classic works of Chinese literature (Confucius), a Chinese–Latin dictionary, and many theological texts in Chinese. He also produced several works in Latin and Chinese providing insights into Jesuit terminology in both languages; a key example is the Ascetica Nomenclatio (1877).

In 1884 he was awarded the Prix Stanislas Julien by the Académie des Inscriptions et Belles-Lettres of Paris for his Cursus litteraturae Sinicae neo-missionariis accommodatus. He published several works on Chinese literature and Catholic theology in both Latin and Chinese.
