= Wade–Giles =

Romanization scheme for Mandarin Chinese

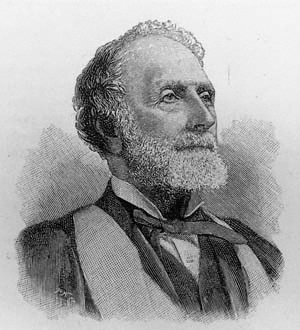
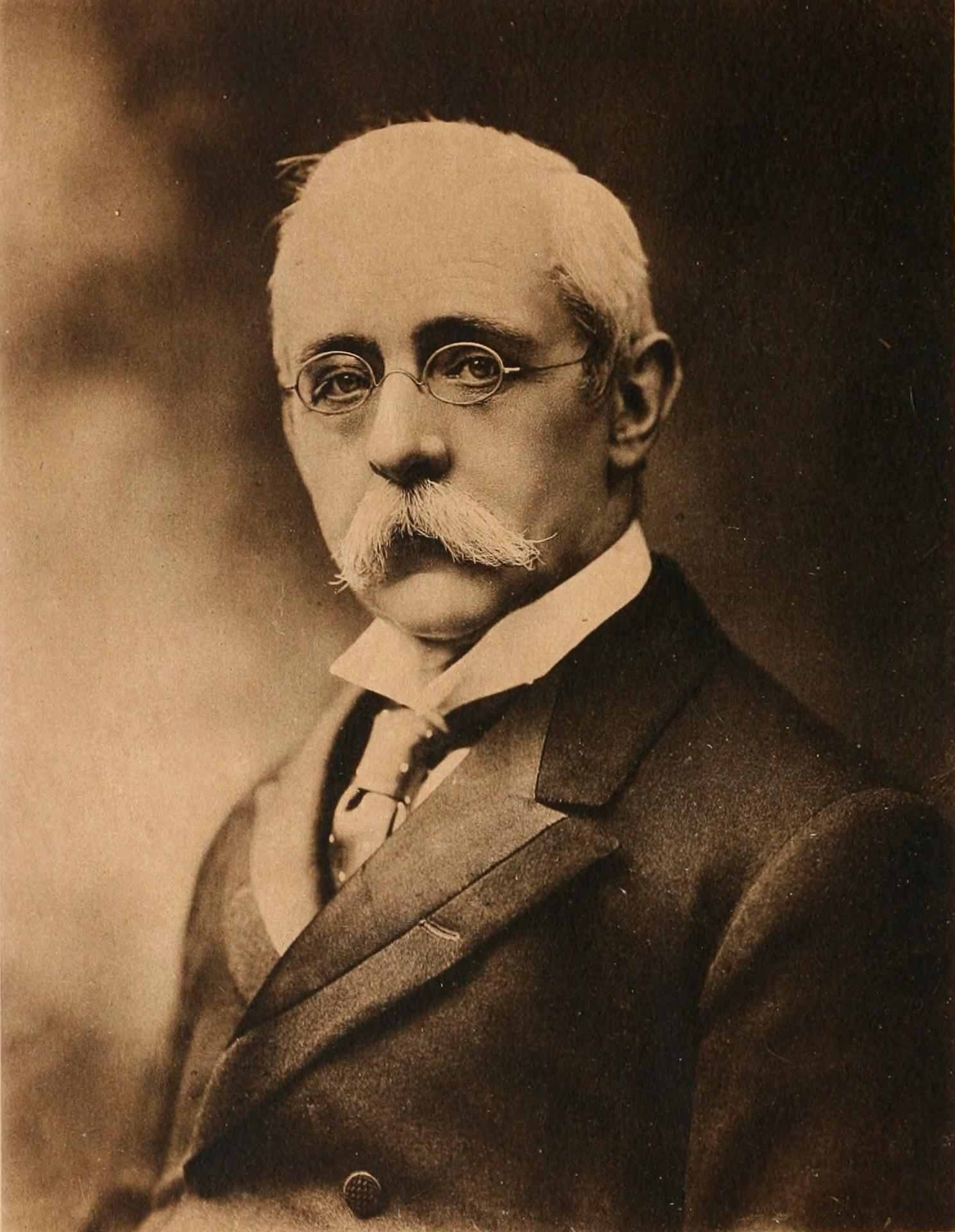
- Thomas Francis Wade (left) and Herbert Giles (right)
- Script type: Alphabet romanization
- Creator: Thomas Wade and Herbert Giles
- Created: 19th century
- Languages: Mandarin Chinese

ISO 15924
- ISO 15924: BCP 47 variant subtag: wadegile

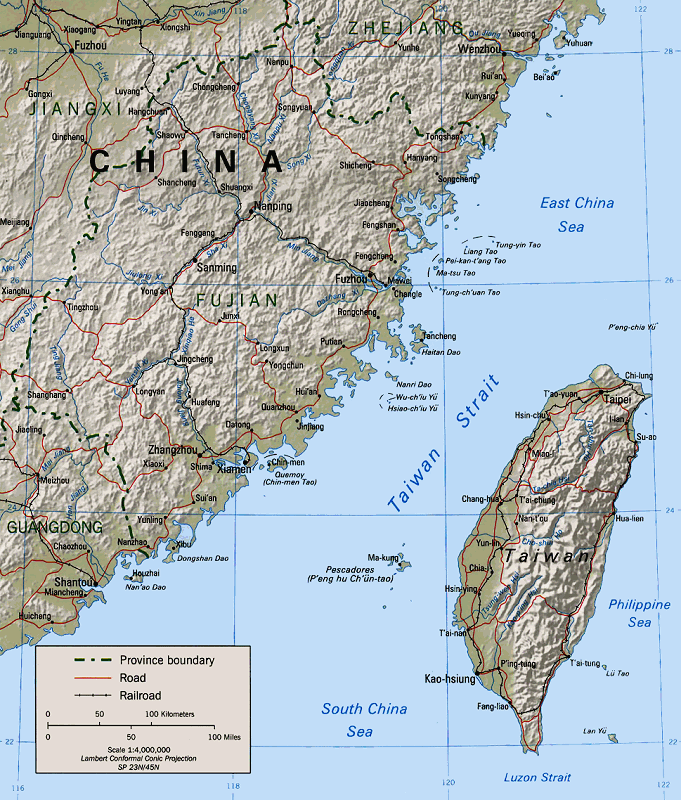
Map of the Taiwan Strait, featuring names using Wade–Giles in Taiwan versus those using pinyin in mainland China

Wade–Giles is a romanization system for the Mandarin Chinese language and the second most common transcription after Pinyin. Based on the Beijing dialect, Wade–Giles was developed from a system produced by Thomas Francis Wade during the mid-19th century, and was given completed form with Herbert Giles's A Chinese–English Dictionary (1892). It became the system of transcription familiar in the English-speaking world for most of the 20th century. It still sees majority usage for names in Taiwan, and has retained a "significant role" in international sinology.

In mainland China, Wade–Giles has been mostly replaced by Hanyu Pinyin, which was officially adopted in 1958, with exceptions for the romanized forms of some of the most commonly used names of locations and persons and other proper nouns. In Taiwan, however, the romanized name for most locations, persons and other proper nouns is still based on the Wade–Giles derived romanized form, for example Kaohsiung, the Matsu Islands and Chiang Ching-kuo.

British library cataloguings adopted Pinyin in 1966, and Wade–Giles began to decline in the 1970s with the gradual acceptance of Pinyin by most nations by 1979 and by the ISO in 1982. It saw continued English publication as late as A.C. Graham's Disputers of the Tao (1989) and Livia Kohn's Lao-tzu and the Tao-te-Ching (1998), and in re-publications such as of Feng Youlan. The Cambridge History of China (2016) continues to use Wade–Giles in conformity with earlier editions.

== History ==
Before the late 19th century, romanization was commonly based on the Nanjing dialect, as a prestigious form of speech at the time dating back to the early 1600s. Wade–Giles was developed by Thomas Francis Wade, a British ambassador in China and a scholar of Chinese who was the first professor of Chinese at the University of Cambridge. Wade published Yü-yen Tzŭ-erh Chi (語言自邇集; 语言自迩集) in 1867, the first textbook on the Beijing dialect of Mandarin in English, which became the basis for the system later known as Wade–Giles. The system was designed to transcribe Chinese terms for Chinese specialists, and was further refined in 1892 in A Chinese–English Dictionary by Herbert Giles, a British diplomat in China, and his son Lionel Giles, a curator at the British Museum.

In the west, Wade–Giles saw early competition with Yale romanization from World War II to the late 1970s, with field manuals reworked into college textbooks.

Taiwan used Wade–Giles for decades as the de facto standard, co-existing with several official romanizations in succession, namely Gwoyeu Romatzyh (1928), Mandarin Phonetic Symbols II (1986), and Tongyong Pinyin (2000). In 2009, under Ma Ying-jeou's Kuomintang-led government, Taiwan officially adopted Pinyin, and the English romanizations on a number of street signs in cities with Kuomintang mayors were switched over to conform to this. However, a majority of Taiwanese people, both resident and overseas, still spell romanized Chinese words and transcribe their legal names using the Wade–Giles system, as well as the other aforementioned systems.

== Initials and finals ==
The tables below show the Wade–Giles representation of each Chinese sound (in bold type), together with the corresponding IPA phonetic symbol (in square brackets), and equivalent representations in Bopomofo and Hanyu Pinyin.

=== Initials ===
		Labial	Dental/Alveolar	Retroflex	Alveolo-palatal	Velar
Nasal		**m** [m] ㄇ m	**n** [n] ㄋ n			
Plosive	Unaspirated	**p** [p] ㄅ b	**t** [t] ㄉ d			**k** [k] ㄍ g
Plosive	Aspirated	**pʻ** [pʰ] ㄆ p	**tʻ** [tʰ] ㄊ t			**kʻ** [kʰ] ㄎ k
Affricate	Unaspirated		**ts** [ts] ㄗ z	**ch** [ʈʂ] ㄓ zh	**ch** [tɕ] ㄐ j	
Affricate	Aspirated		**tsʻ** [tsʰ] ㄘ c	**chʻ** [ʈʂʰ] ㄔ ch	**chʻ** [tɕʰ] ㄑ q	
Fricative		**f** [f] ㄈ f	**s** [s] ㄙ s	**sh** [ʂ] ㄕ sh	**hs** [ɕ] ㄒ x	**h** [x] ㄏ h
Liquid			**l** [l] ㄌ l	**j** [ɻ~ʐ] ㄖ r		

Instead of ts, tsʻ and s, Wade–Giles writes tz, tzʻ and ss before ŭ (see below).

=== Finals ===
		Coda												
		∅			/i/		/u/		/n/		/ŋ/			/ɻ/
Medial	∅	**ih/ŭ** [ɨ] ㄭ -i	**ê/o** [ɤ] ㄜ e	**a** [a] ㄚ a	**ei** [ei] ㄟ ei	**ai** [ai] ㄞ ai	**ou** [ou] ㄡ ou	**ao** [au] ㄠ ao	**ên** [ən] ㄣ en	**an** [an] ㄢ an	**ung** [ʊŋ] ㄨㄥ ong	**êng** [əŋ] ㄥ eng	**ang** [aŋ] ㄤ ang	**êrh** [aɚ̯] ㄦ er
Medial	/j/	**i** [i] ㄧ i	**ieh** [je] ㄧㄝ ie	**ia** [ja] ㄧㄚ ia			**iu** [jou] ㄧㄡ iu	**iao** [jau] ㄧㄠ iao	**in** [in] ㄧㄣ in	**ien** [jɛn] ㄧㄢ ian	**iung** [jʊŋ] ㄩㄥ iong	**ing** [iŋ] ㄧㄥ ing	**iang** [jaŋ] ㄧㄤ iang	
Medial	/w/	**u** [u] ㄨ u	**o/uo** [wo] ㄛ/ㄨㄛ o/uo	**ua** [wa] ㄨㄚ ua	**ui/uei** [wei] ㄨㄟ ui	**uai** [wai] ㄨㄞ uai			**un** [wən] ㄨㄣ un	**uan** [wan] ㄨㄢ uan			**uang** [waŋ] ㄨㄤ uang	
Medial	/ɥ/	**ü** [y] ㄩ ü	**üeh** [ɥe] ㄩㄝ üe						**ün** [yn] ㄩㄣ ün	**üan** [ɥɛn] ㄩㄢ üan				

Wade–Giles writes -uei after kʻ and k, otherwise -ui: kʻuei, kuei, hui, shui, chʻui.

It writes [-ɤ] as -o after kʻ, k and h, otherwise as -ê: kʻo, ko, ho, shê, chʻê. When [ɤ] forms a syllable on its own, it is written ê or o depending on the character.

Wade–Giles writes [-wo] as -uo after kʻ, k, h and sh, otherwise as -o: kʻuo, kuo, huo, shuo, bo, tso. After chʻ, it is written chʻo or chʻuo depending on the character.

For -ih and -ŭ, see below.

Giles's A Chinese–English Dictionary also includes the finals -io (in yo, chio, chʻio, hsio, lio and nio) and -üo (in chüo, chʻüo, hsüo, lüo and nüo), both of which are pronounced -üeh in modern Standard Chinese: yüeh, chüeh, chʻüeh, hsüeh, lüeh and nüeh.

=== Syllables that begin with a medial ===
		Coda											
		∅			/i/		/u/		/n/		/ŋ/		
Medial	/j/	**i/yi** [i] ㄧ yi	**yeh** [je] ㄧㄝ ye	**ya** [ja] ㄧㄚ ya		**yai** [jai] ㄧㄞ yai	**yu** [jou] ㄧㄡ you	**yao** [jau] ㄧㄠ yao	**yin** [in] ㄧㄣ yin	**yen** [jɛn] ㄧㄢ yan	**yung** [jʊŋ] ㄩㄥ yong	**ying** [iŋ] ㄧㄥ ying	**yang** [jaŋ] ㄧㄤ yang
Medial	/w/	**wu** [u] ㄨ wu	**wo** [wo] ㄨㄛ wo	**wa** [wa] ㄨㄚ wa	**wei** [wei] ㄨㄟ wei	**wai** [wai] ㄨㄞ wai			**wên** [wən] ㄨㄣ wen	**wan** [wan] ㄨㄢ wan		**wêng** [wəŋ] ㄨㄥ weng	**wang** [waŋ] ㄨㄤ wang
Medial	/ɥ/	**yü** [y] ㄩ yu	**yüeh** [ɥe] ㄩㄝ yue						**yün** [yn] ㄩㄣ yun	**yüan** [ɥɛn] ㄩㄢ yuan			

Wade–Giles writes the syllable [i] as i or yi depending on the character.

== System features ==
=== Consonants and initial symbols ===
A feature of the Wade–Giles system is the representation of the unaspirated-aspirated stop consonant pairs using a character resembling an apostrophe. Thomas Wade and others used the spiritus asper (ʽ or ʻ), borrowed from the polytonic orthography of the Ancient Greek language. Herbert Giles and others used a left (opening) curved single quotation mark (‘) for the same purpose. A third group used a plain apostrophe ('). The backtick, and visually similar characters, are sometimes seen in electronic documents using the system.

Examples using the spiritus asper: p, pʻ, t, tʻ, k, kʻ, ch, chʻ. The use of this character preserves b, d, g, and j for the romanization of Chinese varieties containing voiced consonants, such as Shanghainese (which has a full set of voiced consonants) and Min Nan (Hō-ló-oē) whose century-old Pe̍h-ōe-jī (POJ, often called Missionary Romanization) is similar to Wade–Giles. POJ, Legge romanization, Simplified Wade, and EFEO Chinese transcription use the letter ⟨h⟩ instead of an apostrophe-like character to indicate aspiration. (This is similar to the obsolete IPA convention before the revisions of the 1970s). The convention of an apostrophe-like character or ⟨h⟩ to denote aspiration is also found in romanizations of other Asian languages, such as McCune–Reischauer for Korean and ISO 11940 for Thai.

People unfamiliar with Wade–Giles often ignore the spiritus asper, sometimes omitting them when copying texts, unaware that they represent vital information. Hanyu Pinyin addresses this issue by employing the Latin letters customarily used for voiced stops (which are unneeded in Mandarin) to represent the unaspirated stops: b, p, d, t, g, k, j, q, zh, ch.

Partly because of the popular omission of apostrophe-like characters, the four sounds represented in Hanyu Pinyin by j, q, zh, and ch often all become ch, including in many proper names. However, if the apostrophe-like characters are kept, the system reveals a symmetry that leaves no overlap:

- The non-retroflex ch (Pinyin j) and chʻ (Pinyin q) are always before either ü or i, but never ih.
- The retroflex ch (Pinyin zh) and chʻ (Pinyin ch) are always before ih, a, ê, e, o, or u.

=== Vowels and final symbols ===
==== Syllabic consonants ====
Like Yale and Mandarin Phonetic Symbols II, Wade–Giles renders the two types of syllabic consonant (simplified Chinese: 空韵; traditional Chinese: 空韻; Wade–Giles: kʻung^{1}-yün^{4}; Hanyu Pinyin: kōngyùn) differently:

- -ŭ is used after the sibilants written in this position (and this position only) as tz, tzʻ and ss (Pinyin z, c and s).
- -ih is used after the retroflex ch, chʻ, sh, and j (Pinyin zh, ch, sh, and r).

These finals are both written as -ih in Tongyong Pinyin, as -i in Hanyu Pinyin (hence distinguishable only by the initial from [i] as in li), and as -y in Gwoyeu Romatzyh and Simplified Wade. They are typically omitted in Bopomofo.

IPA	ʈ͡ʂɻ̩	ʈ͡ʂʰɻ̩	ʂɻ̩	ɻɻ̩	t͡sɹ̩	t͡sʰɹ̩	sɹ̩
Yale	jr	chr	shr	r	dz	tsz	sz
MPS II	jr	chr	shr	r	tz	tsz	sz
Wade–Giles	chih	chʻih	shih	jih	tzŭ	tzʻŭ	ssŭ
Tongyong Pinyin	jhih	chih	shih	rih	zih	cih	sih
Hanyu Pinyin	zhi	chi	shi	ri	zi	ci	si
Gwoyeu Romatzyh	jy	chy	shy	ry	tzy	tsy	sy
Simplified Wade	chy	chhy	shy	ry	tsy	tshy	sy
Bopomofo	ㄓ	ㄔ	ㄕ	ㄖ	ㄗ	ㄘ	ㄙ

==== Vowel o ====
Final o in Wade–Giles has two pronunciations in modern Peking dialect: [wo] and [ɤ].

What is pronounced in vernacular Peking dialect as a close-mid back unrounded vowel [ɤ] is written usually as ê, but sometimes as o, depending on historical pronunciation (at the time Wade–Giles was developed). Specifically, after velar initials k, kʻ and h (and a historical ng, which had been dropped by the time Wade–Giles was developed), o is used; for example, "哥" is ko^{1} (Pinyin gē) and "刻" is kʻo^{4} (Pinyin kè). In Peking dialect, o after velars (and what used to be ng) have shifted to [ɤ], thus they are written as ge, ke, he and e in Pinyin. When [ɤ] forms a syllable on its own, Wade–Giles writes ê or o depending on the character. In all other circumstances, it writes ê.

What is pronounced in Peking dialect as [wo] is usually written as o in Wade–Giles, except for wo, shuo (e.g. "說" shuo^{1}) and the three syllables of kuo, kʻuo, and huo (as in 過, 霍, etc.), which contrast with ko, kʻo, and ho that correspond to Pinyin ge, ke, and he. This is because characters like 羅, 多, etc. (Wade–Giles: lo^{2}, to^{1}; Pinyin: luó, duō) did not originally carry the medial [w]. Peking dialect does not have phonemic contrast between o and -uo/wo (except in interjections when used alone) and a medial [w] is usually inserted in front of -o to form [wo].

IPA	pwo	pʰwo	mwo	fwo	two	tʰwo	nwo	lwo	kɤ	kʰɤ	xɤ	ʈ͡ʂwo	ʈ͡ʂʰwo	ʐwo	t͡swo	t͡sʰwo	swo	ɤ	wo
Wade–Giles	po	pʻo	mo	fo	to	tʻo	no	lo	ko	kʻo	ho	cho	chʻo	jo	tso	tsʻo	so	o/ê	wo
Zhuyin	ㄅㄛ	ㄆㄛ	ㄇㄛ	ㄈㄛ	ㄉㄨㄛ	ㄊㄨㄛ	ㄋㄨㄛ	ㄌㄨㄛ	ㄍㄜ	ㄎㄜ	ㄏㄜ	ㄓㄨㄛ	ㄔㄨㄛ	ㄖㄨㄛ	ㄗㄨㄛ	ㄘㄨㄛ	ㄙㄨㄛ	ㄜ	ㄨㄛ
Pinyin	bo	po	mo	fo	duo	tuo	nuo	luo	ge	ke	he	zhuo	chuo	ruo	zuo	cuo	suo	e	wo

Zhuyin and Pinyin write [wo] as ㄛ -o after ㄅ b, ㄆ p, ㄇ m and ㄈ f, and as ㄨㄛ -uo after all other initials.

=== Tones ===
Tones are indicated in Wade–Giles using superscript numbers (1–4) placed after the syllable. This contrasts with the use of diacritics to represent the tones in Pinyin. For example, the Pinyin qiàn (fourth tone) has the Wade–Giles equivalent chʻien^{4}.

Tone	Sample text (s; t; lit)	Hanyu Pinyin	Wade–Giles
1. high	妈; 媽; 'mom'	mā	ma^{1}
2. rising	麻; 麻; 'hemp'	má	ma^{2}
3. low (dipping)	马; 馬; 'horse'	mǎ	ma^{3}
4. falling	骂; 罵; 'scold'	mà	ma^{4}
5. neutral (Note: See neutral tone for more.)	吗; 嗎; (interrogative)	ma	ma

=== Punctuation ===
Wade–Giles uses hyphens to separate all syllables within a word (whereas Pinyin separates syllables only in specially defined cases, using hyphens or closing (right) single quotation marks as appropriate).

If a syllable is not the first in a word, its first letter is not capitalized, even if it is part of a proper noun. The use of apostrophe-like characters, hyphens, and capitalization is frequently not observed in place names and personal names. For example, the majority of overseas Taiwanese people write their given names like "Tai Lun" or "Tai-Lun", whereas the Wade–Giles is actually "Tai-lun". (See also Chinese names.)

== Comparison with other systems ==
=== Pinyin ===
- Wade–Giles chose the French-like ⟨j⟩ (implying a sound like IPA's [ʒ], as in s in English measure) to represent a Northern Mandarin pronunciation of what is represented as ⟨r⟩ in pinyin (Northern Mandarin [ʐ]/ Southern Mandarin [ɻ])
- Ü (representing /y/) always has an umlaut above, while pinyin only employs it in the cases of nü, nüe, lü, lüe and lüan, while leaving it out after j, q, x and y as a simplification because ⟨u⟩/[u] cannot otherwise appear after those letters. (The vowel ⟨u⟩/[u] can occur in those cases in pinyin where the diaeresis are indicated ⟨ü⟩/[y] or [ɥ]; in which cases it serves to distinguish the front vowel [y] from the back vowel [u]. By contrast it is always present to mark the front vowel in Wade–Giles.) Because yü (as in 玉 "jade") must have an umlaut in Wade–Giles, the umlaut-less yu in Wade–Giles is freed up for what corresponds to you (有 "have"/"there is") in Pinyin.
- The Pinyin cluster ⟨-ong⟩ is ⟨-ung⟩ in Wade–Giles, reflecting the pronunciation of [ʊ] as in English book /bʊk/. (Compare kung^{1}-fu to gōngfu as an example.)
- After a consonant, both Wade–Giles and Pinyin use ⟨-iu⟩ and ⟨-un⟩ instead of the complete syllables: ⟨-iou⟩ and ⟨-uên⟩/⟨-uen⟩.

=== Chart ===
Vowels a, e, o
IPA	a	ɔ	ɛ	ɤ	ai	ei	au	ou	an	ən	aŋ	əŋ	ʊŋ	aɹ
Pinyin	a	o	ê	e	ai	ei	ao	ou	an	en	ang	eng	ong	er
Tongyong Pinyin	a	o	ê	e	ai	ei	ao	ou	an	en	ang	eng	ong	er
Wade–Giles	a	o	eh	ê/o	ai	ei	ao	ou	an	ên	ang	êng	ung	êrh
Bopomofo	ㄚ	ㄛ	ㄝ	ㄜ	ㄞ	ㄟ	ㄠ	ㄡ	ㄢ	ㄣ	ㄤ	ㄥ	ㄨㄥ	ㄦ
example	阿	喔	誒	俄	艾	黑	凹	偶	安	恩	昂	冷	中	二

Vowels i, u, y
IPA	i	je	jou	jɛn	in	iŋ	jʊŋ	u	wo	wei	wən	wəŋ	y	ɥe	ɥɛn	yn
Pinyin	yi	ye	you	yan	yin	ying	yong	wu	wo/o	wei	wen	weng	yu	yue	yuan	yun
Tongyong Pinyin	yi	ye	you	yan	yin	ying	yong	wu	wo/o	wei	wun	wong	yu	yue	yuan	yun
Wade–Giles	i/yi	yeh	yu	yen	yin	ying	yung	wu	wo/o	wei	wên	wêng	yü	yüeh	yüan	yün
Bopomofo	ㄧ	ㄧㄝ	ㄧㄡ	ㄧㄢ	ㄧㄣ	ㄧㄥ	ㄩㄥ	ㄨ	ㄨㄛ/ㄛ	ㄨㄟ	ㄨㄣ	ㄨㄥ	ㄩ	ㄩㄝ	ㄩㄢ	ㄩㄣ
example	一	也	又	言	音	英	用	五	我	位	文	翁	玉	月	元	雲

Non-sibilant consonants
IPA	p	pʰ	m	fəŋ	tjou	twei	twən	tʰɤ	ny	ly	kɤ	kʰɤ	xɤ
Pinyin	b	p	m	feng	diu	dui	dun	te	nü	lü	ge	ke	he
Tongyong Pinyin	b	p	m	fong	diou	duei	dun	te	nyu	lyu	ge	ke	he
Wade–Giles	p	pʻ	m	fêng	tiu	tui	tun	tʻê	nü	lü	ko	kʻo	ho
Bopomofo	ㄅ	ㄆ	ㄇ	ㄈㄥ	ㄉㄧㄡ	ㄉㄨㄟ	ㄉㄨㄣ	ㄊㄜ	ㄋㄩ	ㄌㄩ	ㄍㄜ	ㄎㄜ	ㄏㄜ
example	玻	婆	末	封	丟	兌	頓	特	女	旅	歌	可	何

Sibilant consonants
IPA	tɕjɛn	tɕjʊŋ	tɕʰin	ɕɥɛn	ʈʂɤ	ʈʂɨ	ʈʂʰɤ	ʈʂʰɨ	ʂɤ	ʂɨ	ɻɤ	ɻɨ	tsɤ	tswo	tsɨ	tsʰɤ	tsʰwo	tsʰɨ	sɤ	swo	sɨ
Pinyin	jian	jiong	qin	xuan	zhe	zhi	che	chi	she	shi	re	ri	ze	zuo	zi	ce	cuo	ci	se	suo	si
Tongyong Pinyin	jian	jyong	cin	syuan	jhe	jhih	che	chih	she	shih	re	rih	ze	zuo	zih	ce	cuo	cih	se	suo	sih
Wade–Giles	chien	chiung	chʻin	hsüan	chê	chih	chʻê	chʻih	shê	shih	jê	jih	tsê	tso	tzŭ	tsʻê	tsʻo	tzʻŭ	sê	so	ssŭ
Bopomofo	ㄐㄧㄢ	ㄐㄩㄥ	ㄑㄧㄣ	ㄒㄩㄢ	ㄓㄜ	ㄓ	ㄔㄜ	ㄔ	ㄕㄜ	ㄕ	ㄖㄜ	ㄖ	ㄗㄜ	ㄗㄨㄛ	ㄗ	ㄘㄜ	ㄘㄨㄛ	ㄘ	ㄙㄜ	ㄙㄨㄛ	ㄙ
example	件	囧	秦	宣	哲	之	扯	赤	社	是	惹	日	仄	左	字	策	撮	次	色	索	斯

Tones
IPA	ma˥	ma˧˥	ma˨˩˦	ma˥˩	ma
Pinyin	mā	má	mǎ	mà	ma
Tongyong Pinyin	ma	má	mǎ	mà	må
Wade–Giles	ma^{1}	ma^{2}	ma^{3}	ma^{4}	ma
Bopomofo	ㄇㄚ	ㄇㄚˊ	ㄇㄚˇ	ㄇㄚˋ	˙ㄇㄚ
example (Chinese characters)	媽	麻	馬	罵	嗎

Note: In Hanyu Pinyin, the so-called neutral tone is written leaving the syllable with no diacritic mark at all. In Tongyong Pinyin, a ring is written over the vowel.

== Adaptations ==
There are several adaptations of Wade–Giles.

=== Mathews ===
The romanization system used in the 1943 edition of Mathews' Chinese–English Dictionary differs from Wade–Giles in the following ways:

- It uses the right apostrophe: pʼ, tʼ, kʼ, chʼ, tsʼ, tzʼŭ; while Wade–Giles uses the left apostrophe, similar to the aspiration diacritic used in the International Phonetic Alphabet before the revisions of the 1970s: pʻ, tʻ, kʻ, chʻ, tsʻ, tzʻŭ.
- It consistently uses i for the syllable [i], while Wade–Giles uses i or yi depending on the character.
- It uses o for the syllable [ɤ], while Wade–Giles uses ê or o depending on the character.
- It offers the choice between ssŭ and szŭ, while Wade–Giles requires ssŭ.
- It does not use the spellings chio, chʻio, hsio, yo, replacing them with chüeh, chʻüeh, hsüeh, yüeh in accordance with their modern pronunciations.
- It uses an underscored ^{3} to denote a second tone which comes from an original third tone, but only if the following syllable has the neutral tone and the tone sandhi is therefore not predictable: hsiao^{3}•chieh.
- It denotes the neutral tone by placing a dot (if the neutral tone is compulsory) or a circle (if the neutral tone is optional) before the syllable. The dot or circle replaces the hyphen.

=== Shadick ===
In Harold Shadick's A First Course in Literary Chinese, the following modifications are made to Wade–Giles:

- Tones are marked with diacritics instead of tone numbers. The diacritics used are the same as in Yale and Pinyin.
- ssu is replaced with szu.
- ê and ŭ are written as e and u.

The Chinese phrase 文言文入門 (Wên^{2}-yen^{2} wên^{2} ju^{4}-mên^{2}) would thus be romanized as Wén-yén wén jù-mén.

=== Anderson ===
This adaptation of Wade–Giles by Olov Anderson has several distinctive features, most notably the use of tonal spelling and the replacement of apostrophes with the letter ⟨h⟩. For example, the aspirated consonants pʻ, tʻ and kʻ become ph, th and kh. Tones are marked by appending the silent letters ⟨v⟩, ⟨x⟩ and ⟨z⟩ to a syllable. Additionally, ŭ is written as y, and circumflexes and -h are dropped in the final position.

== Gallery ==
Examples of Wade–Giles derived English language terminology:

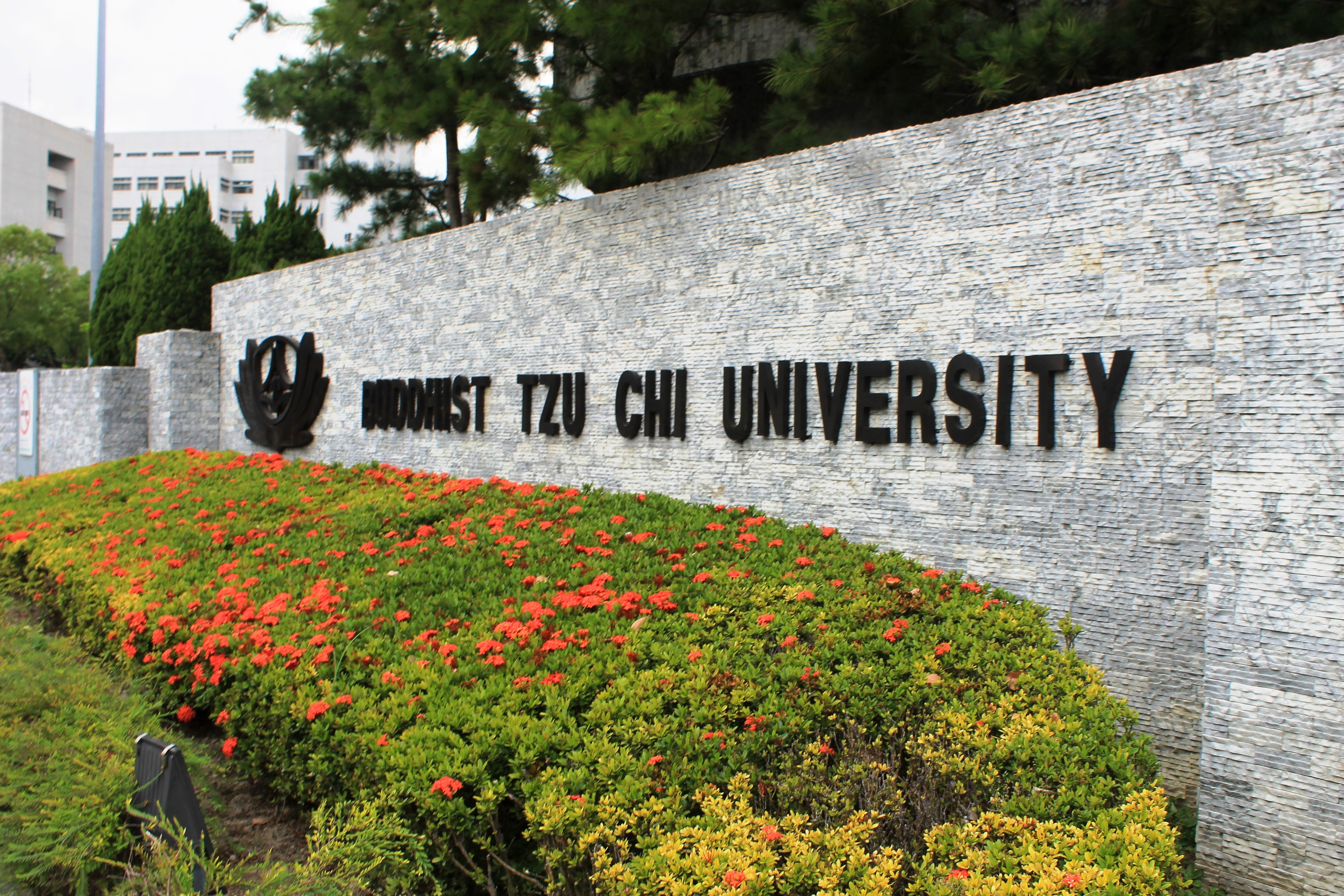
Tzu Chi University, Hualien

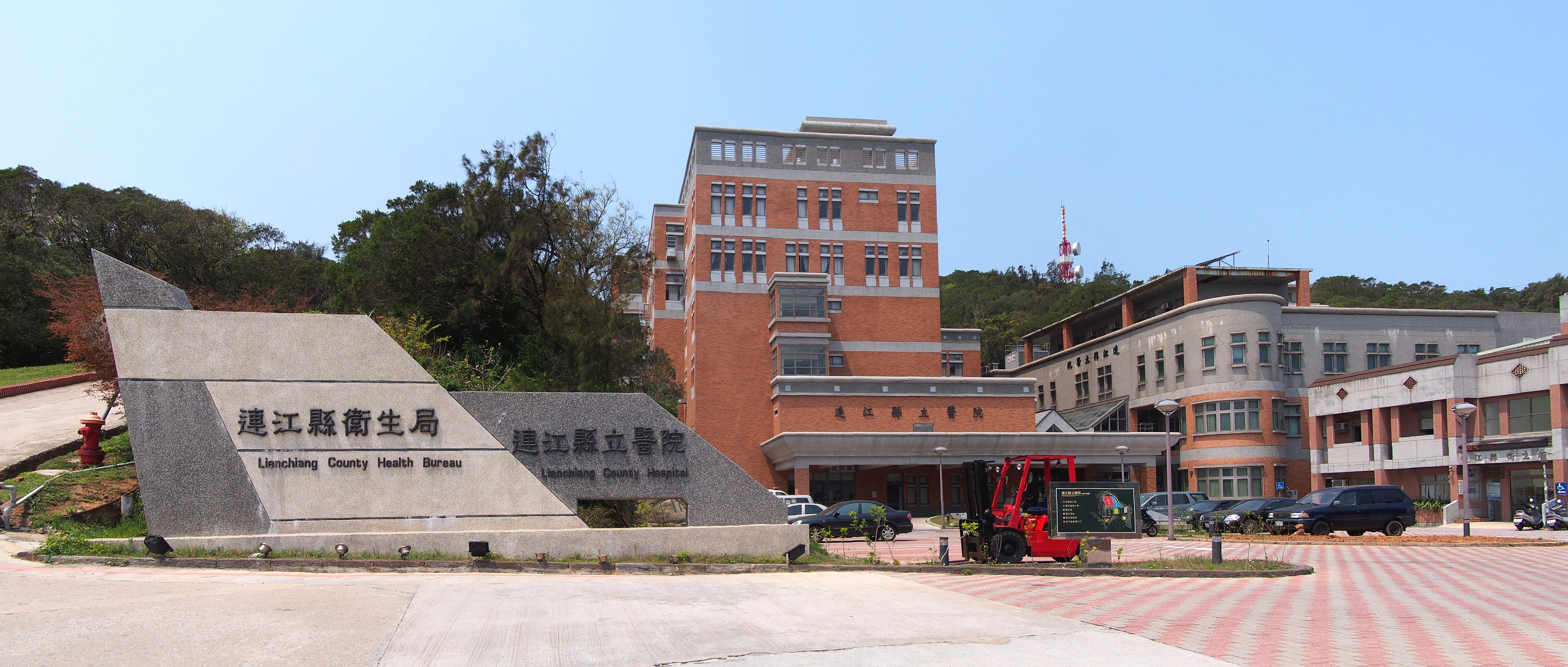
Lienchiang County Hospital and Health Bureau

Emblem of Pingtung County

== See also ==
- Comparison of Chinese transcription systems
- Cyrillization of Chinese
- Daoism–Taoism romanization issue
- Legge romanization
- Romanization of Chinese
- Simplified Wade

== Bibliography ==
- Wade, Thomas Francis. A progressive course designed to assist the student of Colloquial Chinese (Yü Yen Tzǔ Êrh Chi) in two volumes. Third edition Shanghai: Hong Kong: Singapore: Yokohama: London: Kelly & Walsh, Limited, 1903.
- Giles, Herbert A. A Chinese–English Dictionary. 2-vol. & 3-vol. versions both. London: Shanghai: Bernard Quaritch; Kelly and Walsh, 1892. Rev. & enlarged 2nd ed. in 3 vols. (Vol. I: front-matter & a-hsü, Vol. II: hsü-shao, and Vol. III: shao-yün), Shanghai: Hong Kong: Singapore: Yokohama: London: Kelly & Walsh, Limited; Bernard Quaritch, 1912. Rpt. of the 2nd ed. but in 2 vols. and bound as 1, New York: Paragon Book Reprint Corp., 1964.
