= EFEO Chinese transcription =

Francophone romanization system for Mandarin

The Chinese transcription system invented by the French School of the Far East (EFEO) was the most widely used in the French-speaking world until the mid-20th century. While it is often deemed to have been devised by Séraphin Couvreur, who was not an EFEO member, its actual creator was Arnold Vissière (1858–1930). It was superseded by Hanyu Pinyin.

The transcription of the EFEO did not borrow its phonetics from the national official Standard Chinese. Rather, it was synthesized independently to be a mean of Chinese dialects, and shows a state of sounds a little older in form (as in Latinxua Sin Wenz and the older version of Wade-Giles). Hence, the phoneme [tɕ] (Pinyin: ⟨j⟩), is transcribed as either ⟨ts⟩ or ⟨k⟩; before the jian-tuan merger in contemporary Mandarin, i.e. the merger between the alveolar consonants and the alveolo-palatal consonants, before the high front vowels [i] and [y].

Since EFEO makes use, to a large extent, of the phonetic values of Latin letters as used in French, the transcription of many Chinese syllables into the EFEO system is quite similar to how they were transcribed by French missionaries in the late 17th to 19th centuries (e.g., as seen in Description ... de la Chine compiled by Jean-Baptiste Du Halde); for example, "Yanzhou Fou" is "Yen-tcheou-fou" in both cases. However, a few features (notably, the wide use of "ts", and the use of apostrophes to show aspiration) distinguishes it from the early French missionary systems.

== Table ==
=== Initials ===
| | | Bilabial | | Labiodental | Alveolar | | Retroflex | | Alveolo-palatal | Velar |
| | | Voiceless | Voiced | Voiceless | Voiceless | Voiced | Voiceless | Voiced | Voiceless | Voiceless |
|---|---|---|---|---|---|---|---|---|---|---|
| Nasal | | | m /m/ ㄇ m | | | n /n/ ㄋ n | | | | |
| Plosive | Unaspirated | p /p/ ㄅ b | | | t /t/ ㄉ d | | | | | k /k/ ㄍ g |
| Plosive | Aspirated | p' /pʰ/ ㄆ p | | | t' /tʰ/ ㄊ t | | | | | k' /kʰ/ ㄎ k |
| Affricate | Unaspirated | | | | ts /ts/ ㄗ z | | tch /ʈʂ/ ㄓ zh | | k or ts /tɕ/ ㄐ j | |
| Affricate | Aspirated | | | | ts' /tsʰ/ ㄘ c | | tch' /ʈʂʰ/ ㄔ ch | | k' or ts' /tɕʰ/ ㄑ q | |
| Fricative | | | | f /f/ ㄈ f | s /s/ ㄙ s | | ch /ʂ/ ㄕ sh | | h or s /ɕ/ ㄒ x | h /x/ ㄏ h |
| Liquid | | | | | | l /l/ ㄌ l | | j /ɻ~ʐ/ ㄖ r | | |

=== Finals ===
| | | Coda | | | | | | | | | | | | |
| | | ∅ | | | /i/ | | /u/ | | /n/ | | /ŋ/ | | | /ɻ/ |
|---|---|---|---|---|---|---|---|---|---|---|---|---|---|---|
| Medial | ∅ | e/eu /ɨ/ ㄭ -i | ö/é /ɤ/ ㄜ e | a /a/ ㄚ a | ei /ei̯/ ㄟ ei | ai /ai̯/ ㄞ ai | eou /ou̯/ ㄡ ou | ao /au̯/ ㄠ ao | en /ən/ ㄣ en | an /an/ ㄢ an | ong /ʊŋ/ ㄨㄥ ong | eng /əŋ/ ㄥ eng | ang /aŋ/ ㄤ ang | eul /aɚ̯/ ㄦ er |
| Medial | /j/ | i /i/ ㄧ i | ie /je/ ㄧㄝ ie | ia /ja/ ㄧㄚ ia | | | ieou /jou̯/ ㄧㄡ iu | iao /jau̯/ ㄧㄠ iao | in /in/ ㄧㄣ in | ien /jɛn/ ㄧㄢ ian | iong /jʊŋ/ ㄩㄥ iong | ing /iŋ/ ㄧㄥ ing | iang /jaŋ/ ㄧㄤ iang | |
| Medial | /w/ | ou /u/ ㄨ u | ouo /wo/ ㄨㄛ uo | oua /wa/ ㄨㄚ ua | ouei /wei̯/ ㄨㄟ ui | ouai /wai̯/ ㄨㄞ uai | | | ouen /wən/ ㄨㄣ un | ouan /wan/ ㄨㄢ uan | ouong /wəŋ/ ㄨㄥ ueng | | ouang /waŋ/ ㄨㄤ uang | |
| Medial | /y/ | iu /y/ ㄩ ü | iue /ɥe/ ㄩㄝ üe | | | | | | iun /yn/ ㄩㄣ ün | iuan /ɥɛn/ ㄩㄢ üan | | | | |

== Bibliography ==
- Drettas, Dimitri (2016). "Fact-Checking Against Diluted Knowledge: Setting the Record Straight on Séraphin Couvreur and the EFEO Romanization System". Sinology News 稷風. No. 2. Jao Tsung-I Academy of Sinology. pp. 39–41.
