= Stephen F. Teiser =

American scholar of Chinese religion

- Occupations: D. T. Suzuki Professor in Buddhist Studies and Professor of Religion, Princeton University
- Awards: Joseph Levenson Book Prize

Academic background
- Education: Oberlin College (AB), Princeton University (MA, PhD)

Academic work
- Discipline: Scholar of religions and East Asia

Stephen F. Teiser (born 1956) is the D. T. Suzuki Professor in Buddhist Studies and Professor of Religion at Princeton University, where he is also the Director of the Program in East Asian Studies. His scholarship is known for a broad conception of Buddhist thinking and practice, showing the interactions between Buddhism in India, China, Korea and Japan, especially in the medieval period; for the use of wide-ranging sources, not only texts and documents, but artistic and material; for a theoretical approach that builds insights from history, anthropology, literary theory, and religious studies; and for seeing Buddhism in both elite and popular contexts.

Each of his monographs has won a major award. Teiser's first monograph, The Ghost Festival in Medieval China (1988) was awarded the prize in History of Religions by the American Council of Learned Societies. His second book, The Scripture on the Ten Kings and the Making of Purgatory in Medieval Chinese Buddhism (1994) was awarded the Joseph Levenson Book Prize (pre-twentieth century) in Chinese Studies. Reinventing the Wheel: Paintings of Rebirth in Medieval Buddhist Temples (2007) won the Prix Stanislas Julien, awarded by the Académie des Inscriptions et Belles-Lettres, Institut de France.

== Education and career ==
Teiser took his undergraduate degree from Oberlin College, then his Master's and Doctorate from Princeton University, where he studied with Alan Sponberg and Denis Twitchett. He is known to his friends as "Buzzy."

== Thought, ritual, and popular religion ==
The Ghost Festival was the subject of Teiser's first book, The Ghost Festival in Medieval China. This festival spread geographically and lasted to the present day in various forms in China, Japan, Korea, and Vietnam. Ancestral spirits are honored, as well as ones that had no descendants to honor them. Teiser found that most of the historical sources and modern scholarship focused on the institutions of the Buddhist church or the services held within its confines, and that they assumed that these institutions and practices developed logically into their historic form. He felt that this neglected the "diffused" nature of Chinese religion. The Ghost Festival, however, was a "complex symbolic event" that was not constrained by any one authoritative text. Its myths and rituals involved every social class, each for its own reasons, and expressed their vitality in a range of social contexts not usually identified as "religious." Teiser shows that the festival is rooted in traditional Chinese observances in the seventh month, with offerings from the harvest, and also in Buddhist practices from India, where there was not a connection with ancestors, but to a yearly retreat for confession and self-release. There has been disagreement on relation of the festival to the Daoist Festival in which offerings are made to the gods who come to this world to judge the living. Teiser argues that the Buddhist festival influenced the Daoist practice, and that the two are "two peaks of pyramids with a common base."

The scholar B. J. Ter Haar praised Teiser's approach in because it "distinguishes itself from existing historical studies by an extremely open and broad-minded attitude towards the subject and the available sources." That is, Teiser does not "confine himself to (or arbitrarily exclude) doctrinal sources, but tries to give all available sources their due," and analyses the different social, literary and religious dimensions of the subject.

His second book, Reinventing the Wheel: Paintings of Rebirth in Medieval Buddhist Temples (2006) won the Prix Stanislas Julien, awarded by the Académie des Inscriptions et Belles-Lettres, Institut de France. Teiser uses both literary and visual sources to follow history and interpretations of the Wheel of Rebirth, or Bhavacakra, an iconic circle divided into sections to represent the Buddhist cycle of transmigration. The meaning of the wheel has been interpreted in different ways in India, Tibet, Central Asia, and China. The book shows how these depictions have appeared in local religious architecture and religious rituals, and that these representations shaped concepts of time and reincarnation and organized the cosmology and daily life of these Buddhist societies.

"The Scripture on the Ten Kings: Making of Purgatory in Medieval Chinese Buddhism, published in 1994, argues that this scripture signals the beginning of a "new concept of the afterlife in medieval Chinese Buddhism" as a "period between death and the next life during which the spirit of the deceased suffers retribution for past deeds and enjoys the comfort of family members." This concept, argues Teiser, is close enough to the situation in medieval Europe to justify the use of the term "purgatory." The text of Scripture on the Ten Kings is dated to the ninth century, though the concepts in it crystalized several centuries earlier. Teiser shows that this idea of purgatory was produced by a collaboration between Indic and Chinese worlds, and was then taken up by Korean and Japanese Buddhism. This conception of purgatory is still a defining concept in modern Chinese life.

John Kieschnick wrote in Harvard Journal of Asiatic Studies that Teiser in these three monographs counters the modernist tendency in present-day Asian Buddhism to emphasize a "this-worldly" social engagement as well as the Western tendency to use Buddhist practices for self-cultivation and internal experiences. Teiser's point, says Keischnick, is that historically and perhaps even among most Buddhists today, Buddhism was not a practical guide but a "framework for understanding and negotiating a cosmos that extends far beyond the visible world in which we live, and far beyond the present, to include future and past lives as gods, ghosts, hell beings, and animals, as well as humans."

Teiser has also edited Readings of the Lotus Sutra (2009). with Jacqueline Ilyse Stone, a group of essays analyzing the Lotus Sutra, and Readings of the Platform Sutra (2012), with Morten Schlütter, which introduces the monk Hui Neng, the Chan Buddhist patriarch, and his most influential sutra.

== Selected publications ==
- Teiser, Stephen F. (1988). The Ghost Festival in Medieval China. Princeton, N.J.: Princeton University Press. ISBN 0691055254.
- —— (1994). The Scripture on the Ten Kings and the Making of Purgatory in Medieval Chinese Buddhism. Honolulu: University of Hawaii Press. ISBN 0824815874. Awarded the Joseph Levenson Book Prize (pre-twentieth century) in Chinese Studies.
- —— (1995). "Popular Religion". Journal of Asian Studies. 54 (2): 378–395. doi:10.2307/2058743. JSTOR 2058743. S2CID 156063450.
- —— (2007). Reinventing the Wheel: Paintings of Rebirth in Medieval Buddhist Temples. University of Washington Press. ISBN 9780295986494.. Awarded the Prix Stanislas Julien by the Académie des Inscriptions et Belles Lettres, Institut de France
- —— (2009). Readings of the Lotus Sutra. with Jacqueline Ilyse Stone. New York: Columbia University Press. ISBN 9780231142885.
- ——; Verellen, Franciscus (2011). "Buddhism, Daoism, and Chinese Religion" (PDF). Cahiers d'Extrême-Asie. 20: 1–14. doi:10.3406/asie.2011.1365.
- —— (2012). Readings of the Platform Sutra. with Morten Schlütter. New York: Columbia University Press. ISBN 9780231158206.
- "Social History and the Confrontation of Cultures," Preface to the Third edition of Erik Zurcher, The Buddhist Conquest of China (Leiden: Brill 2007), pp. xii- xxviii.

== Sources ==
- "Stephen F. Teiser". Princeton University.
