= James Robson (academic) =

American sinologist

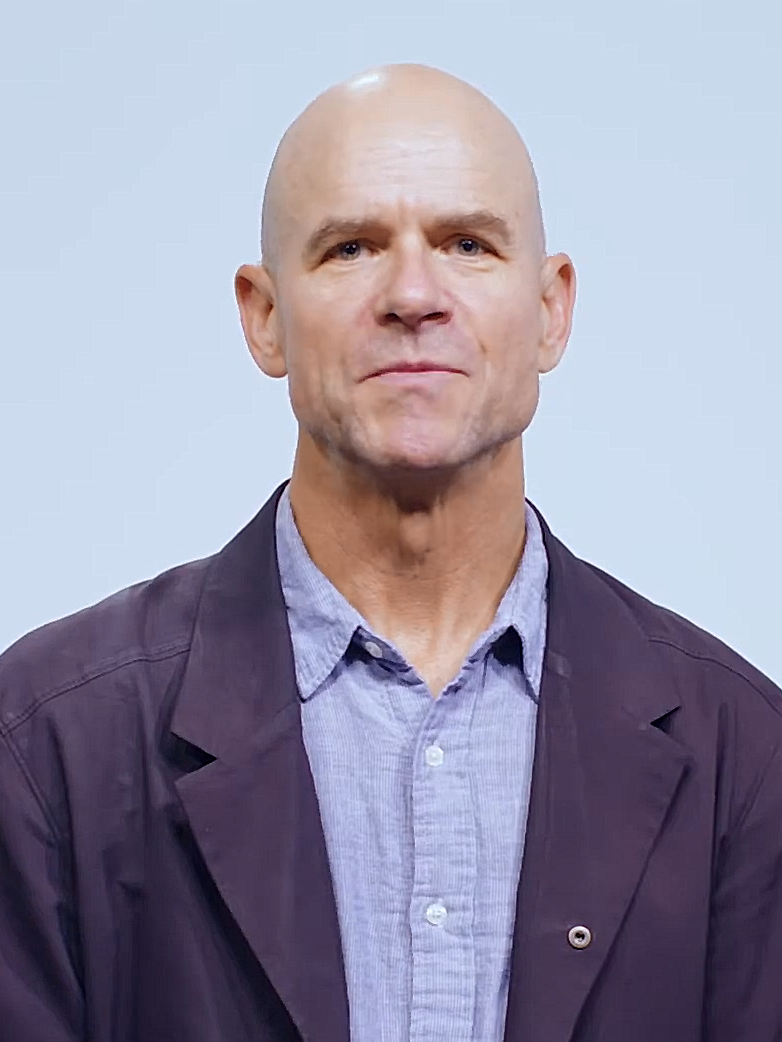
- Robson in 2019
- Born: December 1, 1965 (age 60)
- Other names: 罗柏松
- Education: University of California, Santa Barbara (BA); Stanford University (PhD)
- Occupation: Sinologist
- Employer: Harvard University

James Robson (born December 1, 1965) is an American sinologist and a James C. Kralik and Yunli Lou Professor of East Asian Languages and Civilizations at Harvard University and William Fung Director of the Harvard University Asia Center. Robson is the incoming director of the Harvard-Yenching Institute, succeeding Elizabeth J. Perry.

== Education and career ==
Robson received his BA in religious studies from the University of California, Santa Barbara in 1987, and thereafter studied in China, Japan, and Taiwan for several years before pursuing his PhD at Stanford University. After completing his doctorate in 2002, he worked at Williams College from 2002–2004, and University of Michigan from 2004–2008, where he received tenure in 2008. Robson became a Harvard faculty in 2008 and was promoted to full professor in 2012.

In January 2024, Helena Kolenda, chair of the Harvard-Yenching Institute board of trustees, announced Robson as the Institute's new director, effective July 1, 2024, succeeding Elizabeth J. Perry.

Robson's Chinese name is Luo Bosong (Chinese: 羅柏松; pinyin: Luó Bósōng).

== Awards ==
Robson's book Power of Place: The Religious Landscape of the Southern Sacred Peak (Nanyue 南嶽) in Medieval China (Harvard University Asia Center, 2009) received the Stanislas Julien Prize for 2010 by the French Academy of Inscriptions and Belles-Lettres [Prix Stanislas Julien by the Académie des Inscriptions et Belles-Lettres (Institut de France)] and the 2010 Toshihide Numata Book Prize in Buddhism.

== Publications ==
- "Faith in Museums: On the Confluence of Museums and Religious Sites in Asia." PMLA, 125, 1 (January 2010): 121–128.
- Buddhist Monasticism in East Asia: Places of Practice. London: Routledge, 2010. (Co-edited with James A. Benn and Lori Meeks)
- The Religious Landscape of the Southern Sacred Peak (Nanyue 南嶽) in Medieval China. Harvard University Asia Center, 2009.
- "Signs of Power: Talismanic Writing in Chinese Buddhism." History of Religions, 48, 2 (November 2008): 130–169.
- "Buddhism and the Chinese Marchmount System [Wuyue]: Excavating the Strata of Mt. Nanyue’s Religious History." In John Lagerwey, ed., Religion and Chinese Society: Volume 1 Ancient and Medieval China. Hong Kong: The Chinese University Press, 2004.
- "A Tang Dynasty Chan Mummy [roushen] and a Modern Case of Furta Sacra? Investigating the Contested Bones of Shitou Xiqian." Bernard Faure, ed. Chan Buddhism in Ritual Context. London: RoutledgeCurzon, 2003.
- "The Polymorphous Space of the Southern Marchmount [Nanyue]: An Introduction to Nanyue's Religious History and Preliminary Notes on Buddhist and Daoist Interaction." Cahiers d'Extrême-Asie 8 (1995): 221–64.
