= A History of Chinese Literature =

Book by Herbert Giles

- Title page for A History of Chinese Literature (1901)
- Author: Herbert Giles
- Language: English
- Subject: History
- Publication date: 1901
- Publication place: British
- Pages: 448

A History of Chinese Literature is a history of Chinese literature written by Herbert Giles and published in 1901.

Although there had been surveys of Chinese literature in Japanese, it was the first such survey to appear in English. In his preface, Giles claims that such a work of history was not already available, even in Chinese, since Chinese scholars realized the "utter hopelessness" of "achieving even comparative success in a general historical survey of the subject". But he adds that "It may be said without offence that a work which would be inadequate to the requirements of a native public, may properly be submitted to English readers as an introduction into the great field which lies beyond". A large part of the book is devoted to translations, "enabling the Chinese author, so far as is possible, to speak for himself".

== Reception and influence ==
The scholar and writer Lin Yutang commented that "'History of Chinese Literature' was a misnomer; it was a series of attempted essays on certain Chinese works, and was not even an outline covering the successive periods.”

Qian Zhongshu noted what he called an "amusing mistake" in Giles' "very readable book." Giles:

Giles gives a complete version of Ssu-k'ung Tu's 'philosophical poem, consisting of twenty-four apparently unconnected stanzas'. This poem, according to Professor Giles, 'is admirably adapted to exhibit the forms under which pure Taoism commends itself to the mind of a cultivated scholar.' This is what Professor Giles thinks Ssu-K'ung Tu to have done, but what Ssu-K'ung Tu really does is to convey in imageries of surpassing beauty the impressions made upon a sensitive mind by twenty-four different kinds of poetry—'pure, ornate, grotesque', etc.

Ezra Pound used Giles' translations as the basis for what have been called his English "translations of translations".

== Editions ==
- Giles, Herbert A. (1901), A History of Chinese Literature, New York and London: Appleton Available online at: Google Books; A History of Chinese Literature Internet Archive; A History of Chinese Literature Project Gutenberg.

== References and further reading ==
- Jasper, David; Geng, Youzhuang; Wang, Hai, eds. (2016). "The 'Ishmael' of Sinology: H. A. Giles' History of Chinese Literature (1901) and Late Victorian Perceptions of Chinese Literature and Culture". A Poetics of Translation: Between Chinese and English Literature. Baylor University Press. pp. 139–158. ISBN 978-1-4813-0418-4. Project MUSE chapter 1754524.
- Kern, Robert (1996). Orientalism, Modernism, and the American Poem. Cambridge University Press. ISBN 0-521-49613-6.
- Wang, Min (2013). The Alter Ego Perspectives of Literary Historiography: A Comparative Study of Literary Histories by Stephen Owen and Chinese Scholars. Berlin: Springer. ISBN 9783642353895.

== Reviews ==
- Candlin, George T. "A HISTORY OF CHINESE LITERATURE (Review)" The Monist 11, no. 4 (1901): 616–27.
- Suzuki, Teitaro. "PROFESSOR GILES'S HISTORY OF CHINESE LITERATURE (Review)." The Monist 12, no. 1 (1901): 116–22.
