= Legge romanization =

Mandarin Chinese transcription system

Legge romanization is a transcription system for Mandarin Chinese, used by the prolific 19th-century sinologist James Legge. It was replaced by the Wade–Giles system, which itself has been largely supplanted by Hanyu Pinyin. The Legge system is still to be found in Legge's widely available translation of the I Ching, and in some derivative works such as Aleister Crowley's version of the I Ching. The transcription was initially devised by Max Müller for the publication of the multi-volume Sacred Books of the East.

== Description ==
Although frequently called a "transliteration", Legge's system is a transcription of Chinese, as there can be no transliteration of Chinese script into any phonetic script, like the Latin alphabet.

Features of the Legge system include:

- the use of ⟨h⟩ to signal consonantal aspiration: e.g. pinyin ⟨pi⟩ or Wade–Giles ⟨p'i⟩ corresponds to ⟨phî⟩,
- the use of a Fraktur letter z ⟨𝖟⟩ distinct from Roman ⟨z⟩, and
- the use of italicized consonants distinct from their normal forms.

Comparing words in the Legge system with the same words in Wade–Giles shows that there are often minor but non-systematic differences, which makes direct correlation of the systems difficult.

=== Vowels ===
The system uses the following vowels and semivowels:

a â ă e ê i î o u û ü w y

Vowel letters also occur in various digraphs, which include:

âi âo âu eh ei ih ui

=== Consonants ===
Legge transcription uses the following consonants:

		Bilabial		Labiodental	Alveolar		Retroflex		Alveolo-palatal	Velar	
		Voiceless	Voiced	Voiceless	Voiceless	Voiced	Voiceless	Voiced	Voiceless	Voiceless	Voiced
Nasal			m [m] ㄇ m			n [n] ㄋ n					ng [ŋ] ㄫ ng
Plosive	Unaspirated	p [p] ㄅ b			t [t] ㄉ d					k [k] ㄍ g	
Plosive	Aspirated	ph [pʰ] ㄆ p			th [tʰ] ㄊ t					kh [kʰ] ㄎ k	
Affricate	Unaspirated				𝖟 [ts] ㄗ z		k [ʈʂ] ㄓ zh		k [tɕ] ㄐ j		
Affricate	Aspirated				𝖟h [tsʰ] ㄘ c		kh [ʈʂʰ] ㄔ ch		kh [tɕʰ] ㄑ q		
Fricative				f [f] ㄈ f	s [s] ㄙ s		sh [ʂ] ㄕ sh		hs [ɕ] ㄒ x	h [x] ㄏ h	
Liquid						l [l] ㄌ l		z [ɻ~ʐ] ㄖ r			
