= Lucie Rault =

French musicologist

Lucie Rault (also known as Lucie Rault-Leyrat) is an ethnomusicologist residing in Paris. She is master of conference in the Museum of Natural History, and was chief of the department of ethnomusicology of the Musée de l'Homme.

== Publications ==
- La Cithare zheng 520 p., Thèse de doctorat de 3ème cycle, Université de Paris X Nanterre, 1973.
- La Cithare chinoise zheng : un vol d'oies sauvages sur les cordes de soie, Editions du Léopard d'Or, Paris, 318 p. ISBN 978-2863770597. This work was awarded the Prix Stanislas Julien from the Académie des Inscriptions et Belles Lettres.
- Musiques de la tradition chinoise, (Paris, Actes-Sud/cité de la musique, coll. Musiques du monde, 2000) 18x14 cm, 192 p. + CD (Diapason d'Or recipient)
- Instruments de musique du monde, (Paris, Hervé de La Martinière, coll. Patrimoine, 2000) 25x31cm, pp232, ISBN 273243678X
- Musical Instruments: A Worldwide Survey of Traditional Music-making Musical Instruments: A Worldwide Survey of Traditional Music-making, Thames & Hudson Ltd (November 6, 2000), ISBN 978-0500510353
- Vom Klang der Welt. Vom Echo der Vorfahren zu den Musikinstrumenten der Neuzeit, Frederking & Thaler (2000), ISBN 3894054239
