= Herbert Giles =

British sinologist and diplomat (1845-1935)

Herbert Giles 翟理斯
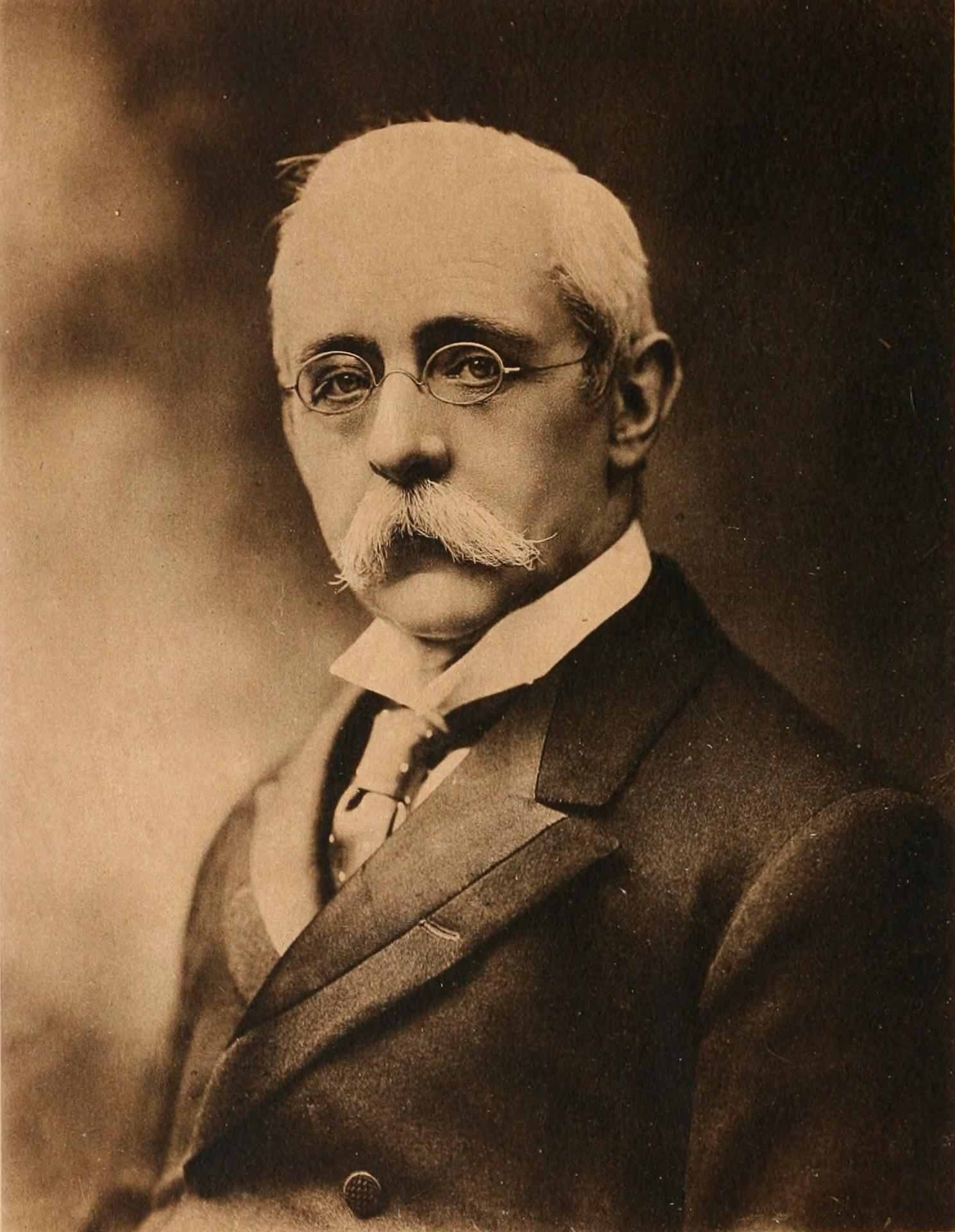
- Giles c. 1922
- Born: Herbert Allen Giles; 8 December 1845; Oxford, England
- Died: 13 February 1935 (aged 89); Cambridge, England
- Known for: Wade–Giles romanization
- Awards: Order of Chia-Ho
- Scientific career
- Workplaces: University of Cambridge

Chinese name
- Chinese: 翟理斯
- Wade–Giles: Chai^{2} Li^{3}-ssŭ^{1}
- Hanyu Pinyin: Zhái Lǐsī
Transcriptions
Standard Mandarin
- Hanyu Pinyin: Zhái Lǐsī
- Bopomofo: ㄓㄞˊ ㄌㄧˇ ㄙ
- Gwoyeu Romatzyh: Jair Liisy
- Wade–Giles: Chai^{2} Li^{3}-ssŭ^{1}
- Tongyong Pinyin: Jhái Lǐsih
- Yale Romanization: Jái Lǐsz̄
- MPS2: Jái Lǐ-sz̄
- IPA: [ʈʂǎɪ lì.sɹ̩́]

Herbert Allen Giles (Chinese: 翟理斯, romanized: Zhái Lǐsī; 8 December 1845 – 13 February 1935) was a British diplomat and sinologist who held the Professorship of Chinese at the University of Cambridge for 35 years. Giles was educated at Charterhouse School before becoming a British diplomat in China. He modified a Mandarin Chinese romanization system established by Thomas Wade, resulting in the widely known Wade–Giles Chinese romanization system. Among his many works were translations of the Analects of Confucius, the Lao Tzu (Tao Te Ching), the Chuang Tzu, and, in 1892, the widely published A Chinese–English Dictionary.

== Biography ==
Herbert Allen Giles was the fourth son of John Allen Giles (1808–1884), an Anglican clergyman. After studying at Charterhouse, Herbert became a British diplomat to Qing China, serving from 1867 to 1892. He also spent several years (1885–1888) at Fort Santo Domingo in Tamsui, northern Taiwan. Giles' great-grandson, Giles Pickford, stated in an address at the opening of the Fort Santo Domingo Museum – 8 November 2005, that his great-grandfather, Herbert A Giles, was Her Britannic Majesty's Consul in Tamsui, Fort Santo Domingo from 1885 until 1891. Prior to that time, in 1869, Giles was based at Kaohsiung. He married Catherine Maria (Kate) Fenn in 1870 and was the father of Bertram, Valentine, Lancelot, Edith, Mable, and Lionel Giles.

In 1897 Herbert Giles became only the second professor of Chinese language appointed at the University of Cambridge, succeeding Thomas Wade. At the time of his appointment, there were no other sinologists at Cambridge. Giles was therefore free to spend most of his time among the ancient Chinese texts earlier donated by Wade, publishing what he chose to translate from his eclectic reading in Chinese literature. Giles published over sixty books, lectures, pamphlets, journal articles, book reviews, and newspaper articles. During his long life he completed a comprehensive Chinese-English Dictionary which took over fifteen years to compile and became a standard reference for many years. Giles also published the first history of Chinese literature and art, which also became a reference work. Some of his translations have stood the test of time and are still among the best available. Giles was not afraid to be controversial and outspoken on numerous topics. To quote his great-grandson, "Most of his enemies were people whose work he had criticized. Such people included E H Parker, a sinologist at Manchester University; Sir Walter Hillier a sinologist from London; and Sir Thomas Wade, Minister to China (1870-76 and 1880-82) and therefore Giles's superior in the Consular Service. Wade was later Professor of Chinese at the University of Cambridge (1888-95). Giles was to succeed him in this position in 1897." Giles was also outspoken on the work of Christian Missionaries and British traders because of the overcrowding of Chinese emigrants on British ships. Yet as Charles Aylmer wrote, in his Memoirs of H. A. Giles, "Notwithstanding his reputation for abrasiveness, he would speak to anyone in the street from the Vice-Chancellor to a crossing-sweeper and was remembered by acquaintances as a man of great personal charm. " Giles wrote some of his works in conjunction with his son, Dr. Lionel Giles, also an expert on China, who was employed as the Deputy Keeper of Oriental Printed Books and Manuscripts at the British Museum.

His later works include a history of the Chinese Pictorial Art in 1905 and his 1914 Hibbert Lectures on Confucianism which was published in 1915 by Williams and Norgate. He dedicated the third edition of Strange Stories from a Chinese Studio (1916) to his seven grandchildren, but at the end of his life was on speaking terms with only one of his surviving children. An ardent agnostic, he was also an enthusiastic freemason. He never became a Fellow at one of the constituent colleges of the University of Cambridge, despite being a university professor for 35 years. Dr. Giles was married twice. His first wife was Miss Catherine Maria Fenn and his second wife was Miss Elise Williamina Edersheim, who died in 1921. On her death, Giles wrote, "In all those 38 years not a syllable came from my pen which was not examined by her and approved before publication." Elise was herself an author, her best known work being China Coast Tales, which she wrote during her time in Tamsui (1885-1888) and which she published under the pseudonym Lise Boehm. On 4 July 1922, the Royal Asiatic Society awarded Giles their Triennial Gold Medal. His friend L. C. Hopkins, was reported to say the following. "If he were asked to formulate in a sentence the special mark and merit of Professor Giles's lifelong labours, he would say that beyond all other living scholars he had humanized Chinese studies. He had by his writings made more readers know more things about China, things that were material, things that were vital – he had diffused a better and a truer understanding of Chinese intellect, its capabilities and achievements, than any other scholar." Giles finally retired in 1932, and died at Cambridge on 13 February 1935, aged 89.

== Legacy ==
Giles received the Prix Julien award from the French Academy in 1897 for his Chinese Biographical Dictionary. Generally considered unreliable among modern academics, Endymion Wilkinson described it as:

full of inaccuracies and the selection leaves much to be desired. Between one third and a half of the dates are wrong because Giles supposed that if somebody is recorded as having died in 1200 aged 63 he or she must have been born in 1137 (in most cases 1138 would have been a better guess).

He also ran afoul of the Chinese scholar Ku Hung-ming, who declared

Dr. Giles' Chinese biographical dictionary, it must be admitted, is a work of immense labour. But here again Dr. Giles shows an utter lack of the most ordinary judgment. In such a work, one would expect to find notices only of really notable men.

Nor did Ku appreciate Giles' Chinese-English Dictionary describing it as

... in no sense a dictionary at all. It is merely a collection of Chinese phrases and sentences, translated by Dr. Giles without any attempt at selection, arrangement, order or method," and "decidedly of less value than even the old dictionary of Dr. Williams."

A recent book on Chinese lexicography says Giles' dictionary has "special significance and interest" and "enjoys pride of place in the history of Chinese bilingual dictionaries as the authoritative source for the Wade-Giles system of Romanization."

The English sinologist and historian Endymion Wilkinson (2013: 85) says Giles' dictionary is "still interesting as a repository of late Qing documentary Chinese, although there is little or no indication of the citations, mainly from the Kangxi zidian)." (Wilkinson 2013: 85) In 1917, Giles funded an award, the Prix Giles, in the amount of eight hundred francs. Administered by the Académie des Inscriptions et Belles-Lettres, it is given every two years to a French person who has written a work about China, Japan, or East Asia, in general.

== Diplomatic postings ==
- British Vice Consul at Pagoda Island, Mawei (1880–1883)
- British Vice Consul at Shanghai (1883–1885)
- British Consul at Tamsui (1885–1891)
- British Consul at Ningbo (1891–1893)

== Awards ==
List of awards and honours:

- Order of Chia-Ho
- Gold medal of the Royal Asiatic Society
- Prix St. Julien by the French Academy (twice)
- Honorary degrees from the University of Aberdeen (1897) and University of Oxford (1924)

== Bibliography ==
=== Books by Herbert Giles ===
- Giles, Herbert Allen (1872). Chinese Without a Teacher. A. H. de Carvalho, Shanghai.
- — (1873). A Dictionary of Colloquial Idioms in the Mandarin Dialect. A. H. De Carvalho, Shanghai.
- — (1874). Synoptical Studies in the Chinese Character. Kelly & Company, Shanghai.
- — (1876). Chinese Sketches. Trübner & Company,, London and Kelly & Walsh, Shanghai. Gutenberg.org: Full text
- — (1877). Handbook of the Swatow Dialect: With a Vocabulary. [Published with the Assistance of the Straits' Government]. N.p., Shanghai.
- — (1877). From Swatow to Canton: (Overland). Trübner, London and Kelly & Walsh, Shanghai.
- — (1878). A Glossary of Reference, on Subjects Connected with the Far East. Messrs. Lane, Crawford & Co., London, Kelly & Walsh, Shanghai, and Bernard Quaritich, New York.
- — (1879). On Some Translations and Mistranslations in Dr. Williams' Syllabic Dictionary of the Chinese Language. A.A. Marçal, Amoy.
- — (1892). A Chinese-English Dictionary. Bernard Quaritch, London and Kelly & Walsh, Shanghai, Hongkong, Yokohama and Singapore. Volume 1
- — (1892). A Chinese Biographical Dictionary (PDF). Bernard Quaritch, London and Kelly & Walsh, Limited, Shanghai and Yokohama. Volumes 1-2
- — (1898). Chinese Poetry in English Verse. Bernard Quaritch, London and Kelly & Walsh, Shanghai.
- — (1898). A Catalogue of the Wade Collection of Chinese and Manchu Books in the Library of the University of Cambridge, Cambridge University Press.
- — (1901). History of Chinese Literature, D. Appleton & Company, New York and London. Wikipedia page: History of Chinese Literature
- — (1901). Great Religions of the World, Harper & Brothers Publishers, New York and London.
- — (1901). Chinese Without a Teacher: Being a Collection of Easy and Useful Sentences in the Mandarin Dialect, with a Vocabulary. Kelly & Walsh, Limited, Shanghai.
- — (1902). China and the Chinese. Columbia University Press, New York.
- — (1905). An Introduction to the History of Chinese Pictorial Art, Bernard Quaritch, London
- — (1905). Religions of Ancient China, Archibald Constable & Co. Ltd., London (Religions: Ancient and Modern series)
- — (1911). Chinese Fairy Tales. Gowans & Gray. Ltd., London and Glasgow.
- — (1911). The Civilization of China.
- — (1912). China and the Manchus. Cambridge University Press. (The Cambridge Manuals of Science and Literature). Gutenberg.org: Full text
- — (1915). Confucianism and Its Rivals: Lectures Delivered in the University Hall of Dr. William's Library, London, October-December 1914, London: Williams and Norgate, 1915 (The Hibbert Lectures: Second Series)
- — (1919). How to Begin Chinese: The Hundred Best Characters. Kelly & Walsh, Shanghai; Bernard Quaritch, London.
- — (1922). How to Begin Chinese: The Second Hundred Best Characters. Kelly & Walsh, Shanghai.
- Revision of Bullock's Progressive Exercises (1922)
- The Chinese and Their Food (Zhonghua Fanshi) (1947, Shanghai) (posthumous)
- "The Memoirs of H.A. Giles," East Asian History 13 (1997): 1–90. Dated 1925.

=== Translations by Herbert Giles ===
- Faxian, Record of the Buddhistic Kingdoms, Trübner & Co., London and Kelly & Walsh, Shanghai, 1877
- Gems of Chinese Literature, 1883; second edition: Shanghai, Kelly & Walsh, 1922
- The Remains of Lao Tzu, 1886
- Chuang Tzǔ: Mystic, Moralist, and Social Reformer, Bernard Quaritich, 1889
- Wang Yinglin, Elementary Chinese: San Tzu Ching, Shanghai: Messrs. Kelly & Walsh, Ld., 1900
- Pu Songling, Strange Stories from a Chinese Studio, Shanghai, etc.: Kelly & Walsh, Ltd., 1916
- Chinese Fairy Tales, 1920 reprint of 1911 first edition. Wikisource: Full text

=== Books relating to Herbert Giles ===
- Launcelot Cranmer-Byng (1902). The Never-Ending Wrong: and Other Renderings of the Chinese from the Prose Translations of Herbert A. Giles. Grant Richards.

== Sources ==
- Cooley, James C., Jr. T.F. Wade in China: Pioneer in Global Diplomacy 1842–1882. Leiden: E. J. Brill, 1981.
- Minford, John and Tong Man. "Whose Strange Stories? P'u Sung-ling (1640–1715), Herbert Giles (1845–1935), and the Liao-chai chih-i" (Archive).East Asian History 17/18 (1999), pp. 1–48. Accessed 1 February 2014.
- Giles, Herbert, Edited and with an Introduction by Charles Aylmer, "The Memoirs of H.A. Giles, The," East Asian History.13 (1997): 1–90.
