= Kristofer Schipper =

Dutch sinologist and ordained Taoist priest (1934–2021)

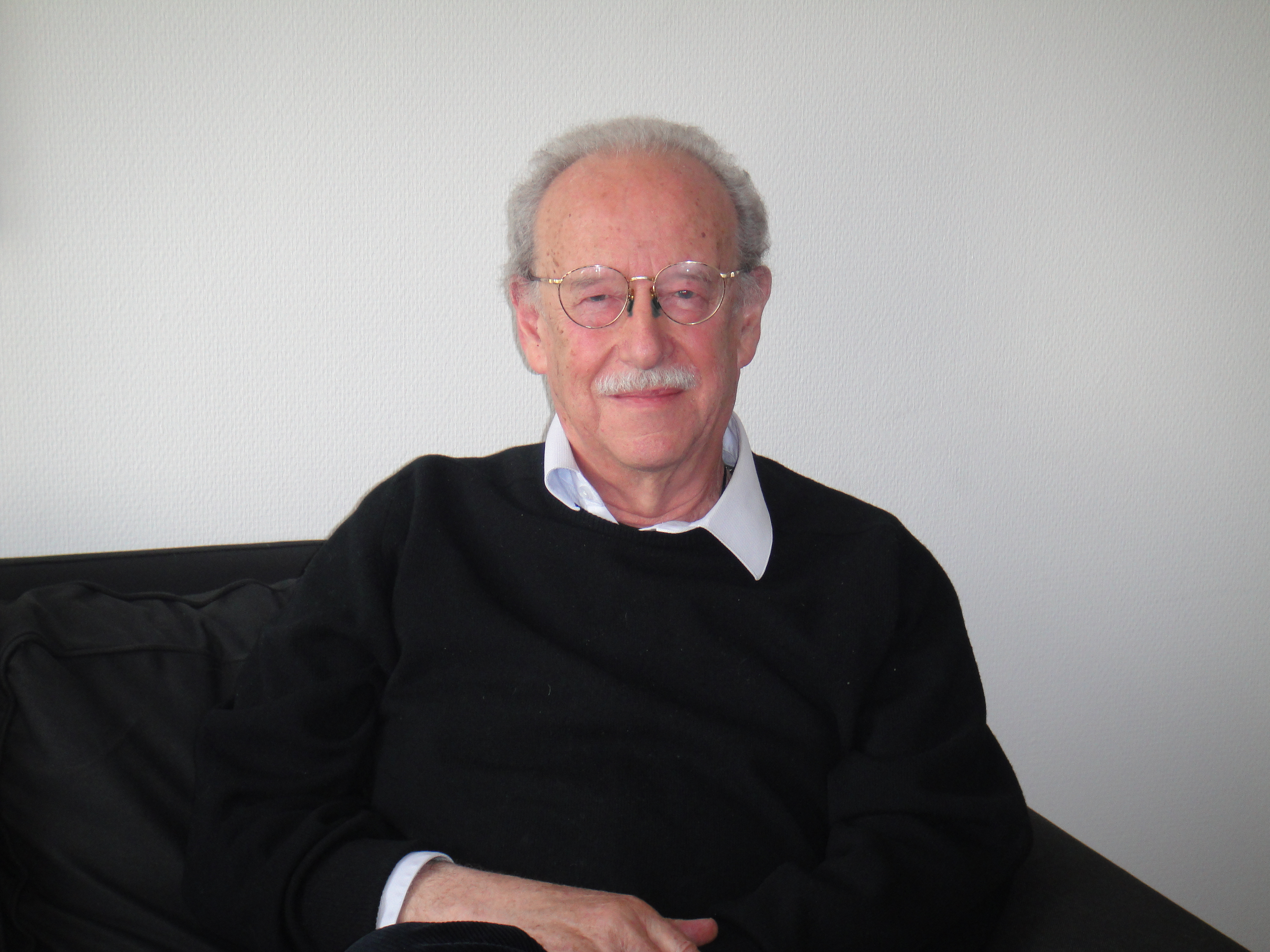
- Kristofer Schipper 2009 photo: Dr.Yuan Bingling
- Born: 23 October 1934; Eda Municipality, Värmland County, Sweden
- Died: 18 February 2021 (aged 86); Amsterdam, North Holland, Netherlands
- Occupation: Sinologist
- Spouses: Wendela Gorter (m. 1962) Yuan Bingling (m. 2000)
- Children: 5

Academic background
- Education: University of Paris
- Doctoral advisor: Maxime Kaltenmark

Academic work
- Discipline: Sinology; Taoism
- Institutions: Fuzhou University

Kristofer Marinus Schipper (23 October 1934 – 18 February 2021), also known as Rik Schipper and by his Chinese name Shi Zhouren (Chinese: 施舟人), was a Dutch sinologist. He was a professor of Oriental studies at Leiden University, appointed there in 1993. Schipper worked as researcher for École française d'Extrême-Orient and later taught as directeur de recherche in History of Daoism studies at the École pratique des hautes études in Paris. He was head of the Institut des Hautes Études Chinoises from the Collège de France. He also taught at Fuzhou University and Zhangzhou College. After his retirement, he and his wife Yuan Bingling moved to Fuzhou (Fujian) in China.

== Early life and education ==
Schipper was born in Järnskog, Eda Municipality, on 23 October 1934. Schipper grew up near Edam, Netherlands.

His father, Klaas Abe Schipper, was a Mennonite Christian pastor, and his mother Johanna Schipper was a devout believer. The couple was declared “Righteous Among the Nations” by Israel's Yad Vashem Holocaust remembrance center, for their efforts in hiding Jewish people during the German occupation of Holland in World War II.

== Research ==
Schipper studied in Taiwan. He was very interested in the ceremonies and rituals that are part of Taoism. Knowledge of the rituals may only be passed on within a family. He was adopted by a befriended family, so he could be trained in Taoism. In 1968, he was initiated as a priest in the Zhengyi School of Taoism. He organized and edited the first complete scientific study of the 1500 works contained in the Taoist Canon of the Ming Dynasty.

Schipper became a member of the Royal Netherlands Academy of Arts and Sciences in 1995.

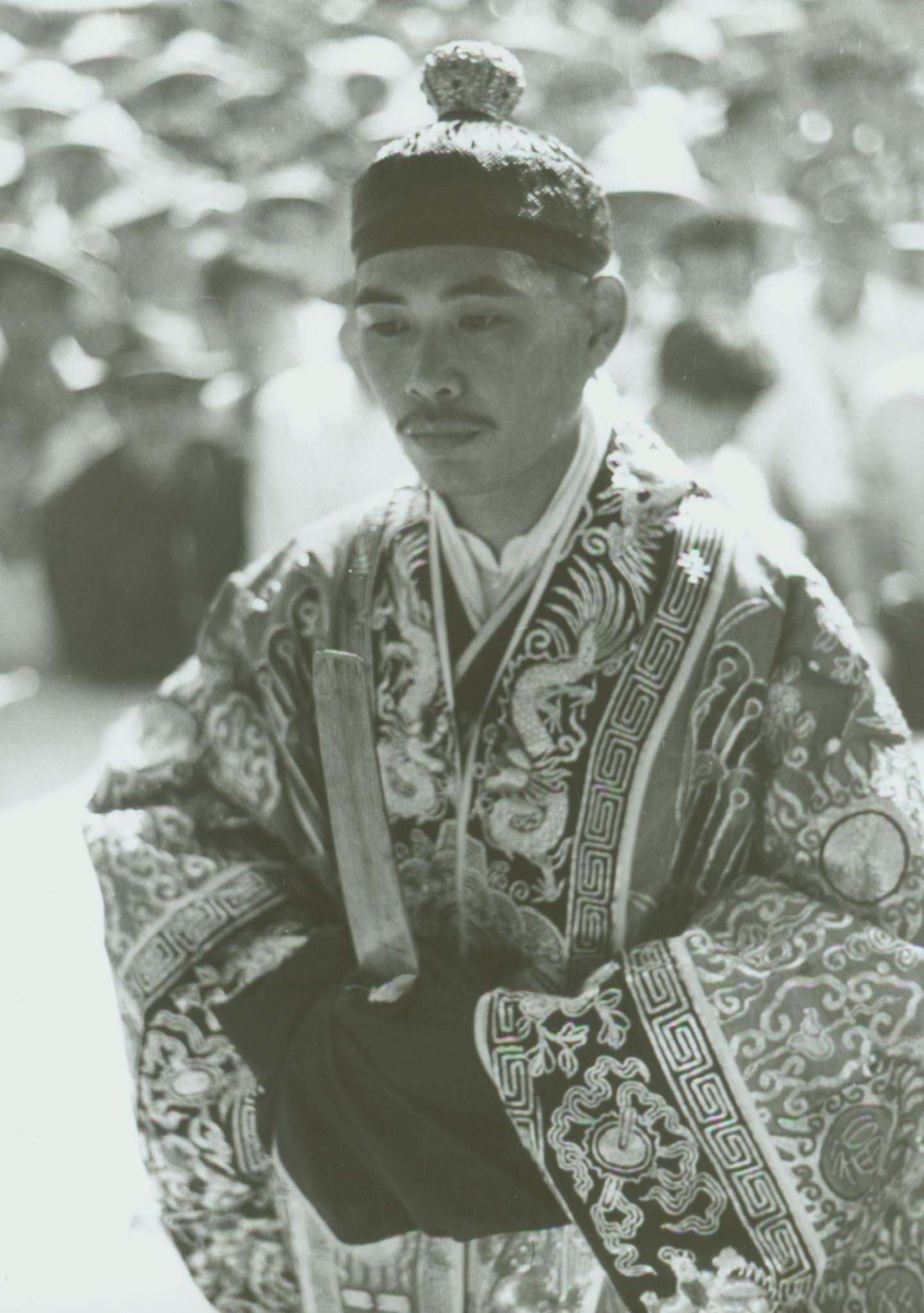
Young Taoist master during his initiation ritual in the Zhengyi order. (Photo: Kristofer Schipper, Gangshan, 1963)

== Library of the Western Belvedere ==
In 2001, Kristofer Schipper and his wife Dr. Yuan Bingling founded the first library in China specialised in western art, literature, and culture, in Fuzhou. It is called the "Library of the Western Belvedere" or "Xiguan cangshulou 西观藏书楼" (Fuzhou University Global Civilization Research Center and Library of the Western Belvedere.)

With his library, they intend to make western literature more accessible to Chinese scientists. The collection consisted, in 2007, of about 25000 titles on literature, art history, and philosophy in many languages, such as English, French, German, Dutch, and other western languages.

== Bibliography ==
- The Taoist Canon, ed. Kristofer Schipper and Franciscus Verellen, The University of Chicago Press 2005, ISBN 978-0-226-73817-8.
- The Taoist Body. Berkeley: University of California Press, 1993.

Schipper, Kristofer, Tao. De levende religie van China, Amsterdam (Meulenhoff) 1988, ISBN 90-290-7731-X (5e druk 2006).
Translation by Schipper of his Le corps taoïste. Corps physique, corps social, Parijs (Fayard) 1982.

- Zhuangzi, De innerlijke geschriften, transl. from the Chinese by Kristofer Schipper, Amsterdam (Meulenhoff) 1997, ISBN 90-290-5619-3
- Zhuang Zi, De volledige geschriften. Het grote klassieke boek van het taoïsme, transl. from the Chinese and annotated by Kristofer Schipper, Amsterdam (Uitgeverij Augustus) 2007, ISBN 978-90-457-0085-4, 439 pg.
