= Séraphin Couvreur =

French Jesuit missionary and sinologist (1835–1919)

Séraphin Couvreur (Chinese: 顧賽芬; pinyin: Gù Sàifēn; EFEO Chinese transcription: kóu sái fēn; 14 January 1835 – 19 November 1919) was a French Jesuit missionary to China, sinologist, and translator. He was also the creator of the EFEO Chinese transcription. The system devised by Couvreur of the École française d'Extrême-Orient was used in most of the French-speaking world to transliterate Chinese until the middle of the 20th century, after what it was gradually replaced by pinyin.

== Biography ==
Couvreur was born in Varenne, France; he entered the Society of Jesus in September 1853, was ordained a priest in 1867 and travelled to China in 1870.

Couvreur arrived at the Catholic Jesuit mission in Hejian, Cangzhou. Also working there was Léon Wieger (1856–1933), another French Jesuit missionary.

He served as a parish priest and a professor in the seminary at Sien-hsien (Xianxian) before publishing a Latin-Chinese dictionary in 1877.

He received the Stanislas Julien Prize twice.

== Works ==
His edition of the 書經 Chou King (Shu Jing), with French and Latin translations, was used by Pound in the Rock Drill section of the Cantos (LXXXV - XCV).

- Langue Mandarine Guide de la Conversation Français-Anglais-Chinois, Contenant un Vocabulaire et des Dialogues Familiers, 1890.
- Les quatre livres. I. La Grande Étude. II. L'Invariable Milieu. (= Les Humanités d'Extrême-Orient. Textes de la Chine). Paris, Cathasia, 1895.
- Cheu king. Traduction de Séraphin Courvreur (1835–1919). Éditions Kuangchi Press, 4e édition, 1966, 556 pages. Fac-simile de l’édition Ho kien Fou, Imprimerie de la Mission Catholique, 1896.
- Chou king, Les Annales de la Chine, avec dessins. Traduction de Séraphin Couvreur. Éditions You Feng, 1999, 464 pages. Fac-simile de l’édition Ho kien Fou, Imprimerie de la Mission Catholique, 1897.
- Choix de documents. Textes chinois avec trad. en latin et en français, 2. éd. - Ho Kien Fou, 1898.
- Choix des documents, Ho Kien Fou, 1901.
- Dictionnaire classique de la langue chinoise. Ho Kien Fu, 1904.
- Dictionnaire français-chinois contenant les expressions les plus usitées de la langue mandarine. Ho Kien Fou, Impr. de la Mission catholique, 1908.
- Dictionnaire classique de la langue chinoise suivant l'ordre alphabétique de la prononciation. 3. éd. Ho Kien Fu, Impr. de la Mission Catholique, 1911.
- Tch'ouen Ts'iou / Tso Tchouan. La Chronique de la principaute de Lou. Drei Bände. Hg. von Séraphin Couvreur. Paris, Leiden 1913 u.a.: Cathasia, Brill u.a. 1951 (Les Humannités d'Extrême-Orient / Textes de la Chine).
- Li Ki. Ou Mémoires sur les Bienséances et les Cérémonies. Texte chinois avec une double traduction en français et en latin (2 Bände). Ho Kien Fou, La Mission Catholique, 1913.
- I-li : Cérémonial. Texte chinois et trad. Hsien Hsien, Mission Catholique, 1916.
- Ceremonial. Paris-Leiden, E.J. Brill-Cathasia-Soc. Les Belles Lettres, 1951 (2nd edition [1916]). - Volume: Série Culturelle des Hautes Études de Tien-Tsin [1916]. Reprint Series: Les Humanités d'Extrême-Orient [1951]. Préface [edition 1916]: Parmi les ouvrages de la Chine, les San Li tiennent un rang distingué. Le premier, le Li Ki , a été traduit en anglais par Legge; nous l'avons traduit en français. Le deuxième, le Tcheou Li , a été traduit en français par Édouard Biot. Le troisième, le I Li , a-t-il jamais été traduit en langue européenne ? Nous l'ignorons. Sans avoir la même importance que les deux autres, il n'est pas sans intérêt. Mais, pour le bien comprendre, il est nécessaire de recourir aux chapitres correspondants du Li Ki . Il aurait été trop long de reporter ici en notes les explications contenues dans le Li Ki . Il sera très utile de consulter souvent les gravures qui sont dans cet ouvrage, spécialement celle qui represente le plan du palais impérial, page 69. Les grandes maisons, les résidences des officiels étaient disposées à peu près de la même manière. La préface et l'introduction placées un tête de la traduction du Li Ki fournissent des renseignements sur la formation, la disparition, la réapparition et les commentaires des trois Li [Hsien Hsien, janvier 1916].
- Géographie ancienne et moderne de la Chine. Hien Hien, Mission cath., 1917.
- Guide de la conversation français-anglais-chinois, Couvreur, S[éraphin], S.J.; Guide to conversation in French, English and Chinese. 11. éd. Sien-Hsien dans le Tcheu Li, Mission cath., 1926.
- Les Quatre Livres - avec un commentaire abrégé en chinois, une double traduction en français et en latin, et un vocabulaire des lettres et des noms propres. Imprimerie de la Mission Catholique de Sien Hsien, 1930, troisième édition
- Confucius: Entretiens de Confucius et de ses disciples. Les Quatre Livres, Band 3. Aus dem Chinesischen ins Französische und Lateinische übersetzt von Séraphin Couvreur. Paris/Leiden, Cathasia/Brill, ca. 1951 (Les Humanités d'Extrême-Orient).
- Meng Tzeu: Oeuvres de Meng Tzeu. Les Quatre Livres, Band 4. Aus dem Chinesischen ins Französische und Lateinische übersetzt von Seraphin Couvreur. Paris/Leiden, Cathasia/Brill, ca 1951.
- Li ki: Ou, Mémoires sur les bienséances et les cérémonies
