= François Marie Savina =

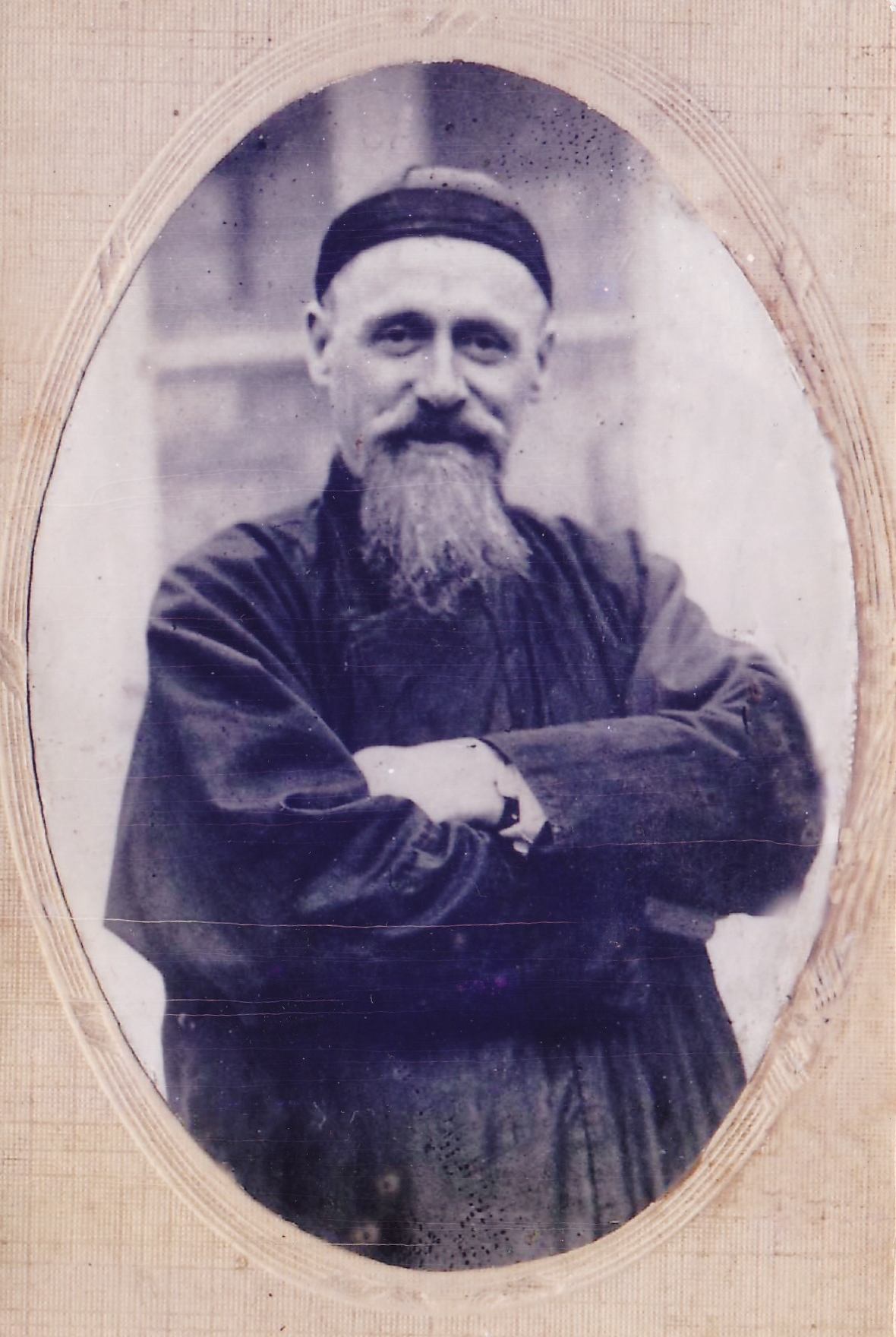
François Marie Savina

François Marie Savina (20 March 1876 – 23 July 1941) was a Frenchman who worked as a Catholic priest and as an anthropologist. For an approximately forty-year period he worked in the Upper-Tonkin Vicariate, Hainan, and Laos. He studied the Hmong people of northern Vietnam and Laos as he was asked to spread Christianity to them. Nicholas Tapp, author of The Impossibility of Self: An Essay on the Hmong Diaspora, described Savina as "One of our earliest informants who is at all frank about the nature of his day-today encounters with the Hmong". Charles Keith, author of Catholic Vietnam: A Church from Empire to Nation, wrote that Savina was "[t]he most notable" missionary ethnographer of Southeast Asia of his era.

Tapp wrote that "Savina spoke Hmong but we do not know how much". Savina also had studied Chinese. Robert Entenmann, author of "The Myth of Sonom, the Hmong King," wrote that Savina "was unfamiliar with Chinese history and the subtleties of Chinese vocabulary".

== History ==
He was born in Brittany, France. In 1901, he arrived in Tonkin after having joined the Société des Missions-Etrangères de Paris (MEP). He was 25 years old at the time.

Initially Savina worked with Hmong in Lào Cai, Vietnam. From 1906 to 1925 Savina worked with the Hmong people in Yunnan, China, and also with Hmong in northern French Indochina. From 1918 to 1921 Savina had an official assignment in Laos. Beginning in 1925 he worked as an ethnographic field research representative of the École française d'Extrême-Orient (EFEO). During that assignment he was based in Hainan and made frequent trips to Hong Kong, where he interacted with a printing house of the MEP. This assignment ended in 1928.

He resumed his missionary activities in 1939 and moved to Ha Giang in Upper Tonkin. He was hospitalized in Hanoi after he came down with pneumonia in March 1941. At age 65 he died on July 23 of that year.

== Publications ==
Savina collected his own data to build eight dictionaries of languages of Southeast Asia, including those in highland and lowland areas. The dictionaries and four lexicons he wrote combined have a total of over 5,000 pages; these were published from 1911 to 1939. Savina also wrote histories and ethnographic texts. Many of his works are about the Hmong people. Savina's publications discuss the Ao, Be, Chinese, Day, Hiai, Hoklo, Miao, Nung, Tay, and Vietnamese languages. His works appeared in academic journals of the era.

Savina wrote Histoire des Miao, published in 1924, and Monographie de Hainan ("Monograph of Hainan Island"), published in 1929. Of Savina's writings, Histoire des Miao is the most well-known and the most often cited. He wrote a 1920 confidential report titled "Rapport politique sur la révolte des Méos au Tonkin et au Laos."
