= Maxime Kaltenmark =

French sinologist of Austrian origin

- Born: 11 November 1910; Vienna
- Died: 26 June 2002 (aged 91); Laval, Quebec
- Occupation: Sinologist

Max Kaltenmark (11 November 1910 – 26 June 2002) was a French sinologist, of Austrian origin.

Between 1949 and 1953, he was director of the "Centre d'études sinologiques de Pékin" of the École française d'Extrême-Orient. He later was directeur d'études at the École pratique des hautes études in Paris until 1979.

== Selected works ==
- 1953: Le Lie-Sien Tchouan : biographies légendaires des immortels taoïstes de l'antiquité
- 1965: Lao Tseu et le taoïsme
- 1972: La Philosophie chinoise (Que sais-je?).
