= Maurice Durand (linguist) =

French-Vietnamese linguist

Copy of a poem in both Chữ Nôm and the Vietnamese alphabet from Durand's collection of manuscripts

Maurice M. Durand (Hanoi, 2 August 1914 – 2 May 1966) was a French-Vietnamese linguist born in Hanoi.

== Biography ==
His father, Gustave Durand, was chief translator of Annamese at the Palais de Justice, Hanoi; Gustave was from Provence and Maurice's mother was from Kien An. He studied in France and married a Belgian violinist named Sylvie Durand. During World War II he was an officer in Cameroon and Chad. In 1946 he returned to Vietnam to teach at and then direct the École française d'Extrême-Orient. On his return to France he taught Vietnamese at the École pratique des Hautes Études.

He died in Paris in 1966 and bequeathed his, and his father's, collection of publications, transliterations, photographs, research notes, and microfilm to Yale University, where they are now held in 121 boxes at the Sterling Memorial Library.

== Publications ==
- Maurice M. Durand et Nguyen Tran Huan Introduction à la littérature vietnamienne. (Paris: G. P. Maisonneuve et Larose, 1969).
- Les manuscrits de Maurice M. Durand.
