= Four-corner method =

Method of encoding Chinese characters

The code of 法 (pinyin: fǎ; meaning "method/law/France") is an example of a fifth digit for an extra part: 3413_{1} (丶十一丶_{一}). (The numbers refer to the code for the colored part, not the order of entry (which is left to right, top to bottom.)

The four-corner method or four-corner system (simplified Chinese: 四角号码检字法; traditional Chinese: 四角號碼檢字法; pinyin: sì jiǎo hàomǎ jiǎnzì fǎ; lit. 'four corner code lookup-character method') is a character-input method used for encoding Chinese characters into either a computer or a manual typewriter, using four or five numerical digits per character.

The four digits encode the shapes found in the four corners of the symbol, upper left, upper right, lower left, and lower right. Although this does not uniquely identify a Chinese character, it leaves only a very short list of possibilities. A fifth digit can be added to describe an extra part above the lower right if necessary. The fifth digit is usually written as a subscript.

The four-corner method, in its three revisions, was supported by the Chinese state for a while, and is found in numerous older reference works and some still in publication. The small Kangorin Sino-Japanese Dictionary by Yoneyama had a four-corner index when it was introduced in the 1980s, but it has since been deleted. However, it is not in common usage today, although dictionaries using it are available. It is identified, in public opinion, with the time when many Chinese were illiterate and the language was not yet unified; more Chinese today use the dictionary to help them write, not read. But it is useful for scholars, clerks, editors, compilers, and especially for foreigners who read Chinese. In recent years it has achieved a new usage as a character input system for computers, generating very short lists to browse.

== Origin ==
The four-corner method was invented in the 1920s by Wang Yunwu, the editor in chief at Commercial Press Ltd., China. Its original purpose was to aid telegraphers in looking up Chinese telegraph code numbers in use at that time from long lists of characters. This was mentioned by Wang Yunwu in an introductory pamphlet called Four-Corner Method, published in 1926. Cai Yuanpei and Hu Shih wrote introductory essays for this pamphlet.

== Mnemonics ==
The four digits used to encode each character are chosen according to the "shape" of the four corners of each character. In order, these corners are upper left, upper right, lower left and lower right. The shapes can be memorized using a poem composed by Hu Shih, called Bihuahaoma Ge (筆畫號碼歌; Bǐhuà hàomǎ gē; 'stroke number song'), as a "memory key" to the system:

Traditional

一橫二垂三點捺，
點下帶橫變零頭，
叉四插五方塊六，
七角八八小是九。

Simplified

一横二垂三点捺，
点下带横变零头，
叉四插五方块六，
七角八八小是九。

Pinyin

Yī héng, èr chuí, sān diǎn, nà;
Diǎn xià dài héng, biàn líng tóu;
Chǎ sì, chā wǔ, fāng kuài liù;
Qī jiǎo, bā ba, xiǎo shì jiǔ.

Meaning

1 for horizontal, 2 vertical, 3 is a dot;
a dot over a horizontal, or already another corner, is 0;
crossing is 4, crossing more than one is 5, a box is 6;
7 for a corner, 八 (shape of '8' character) is 8, and 小 is 9.

In the 1950s, lexicographers in the People's Republic of China changed the poem somewhat in order to avoid association with Hu Shih, who had criticized the Chinese Communist Party, although the contents remain generally unchanged. The 1950s version is as follows:

Traditional

横一垂二三點捺，
叉四插五方框六，
七角八八九是小，
點下有横變零頭。

Simplified

横一垂二三点捺，
叉四插五方框六，
七角八八九是小，
点下有横变零头。

Pinyin

Héng yī, chuí èr, sān diǎn, nà;
Chǎ sì, chā wǔ, fāng kuàng liù;
Qī jiǎo, bā ba, jiǔ shì xiǎo;
Diǎn xià yǒu héng, biàn líng tóu.

Meaning

horizontal is 1, vertical 2, 3 is a dot;
crossing is 4, crossing more than one is 5, a box is 6;
7 for a corner, 8 for 八 (shape of '8' character), 9 is 小;
and a dot over a horizontal, or already another corner is 0.

Several other notes:

- A single stroke can be represented in more than one corner, as is the case with many curly strokes. (e.g. the code for 乙 is 1771)
- If the character is fenced by 囗, 門 (门), or 鬥, the lower corners are used to denote what is inside the radical, instead of 00 for 囗 or 22 for the others. (e.g. the code for 回 is 6060)

There have been scores, maybe hundreds, of such numerical and alpha-numerical systems proposed or popularized (such as Lin Yutang's "Instant Index", Trindex, Head-tail, Wang An's Sanjiahaoma, Halpern); some Chinese refer to these generically as sijiaohaoma (after the original pamphlet) though this is not correct.

== Versions ==
Over time, the four-corner method has gone through some changes.

=== First Version ===
The first (revised) version was published in Shanghai in 1928. It was quickly adopted and popularized as a method for (among other things):

- Arranging and indexing Chinese characters in dictionaries
- Indexing Chinese classical and modern books, libraries, hospital and police records
- Chinese typewriters
- Military code making (for handling the characters quickly)

The Wang Yun-wu Da Cidian of 1928 was remarkable for its time, and although the pronunciations were very much in line with today's Standard Chinese, the lack of a phonetic index diminished its overall usefulness. The northern Mandarin pronunciations were given in Gwoyeu Romatzyh, a romanization system devised by linguist Zhao Yuanren, as well as in Mandarin Phonetic System (MPS or Bopomofo) characters with a dotted corner for tone. It also delineated parts of speech, and all compounds were listed by the four-corner method as well.

The famed lexicographer and editor of Ciyuan, Lu Erkui, as well as other lexicographers, became early proponents of the four-corner method. By 1931, it was used extensively by the Commercial Press to index virtually all classical reference works and collections of China, such as the Pei Wen Yun Fu and Complete Library of the Four Treasuries, as well as many modern ones.

Hospital, personnel and police records were organized just like the biographical indexes and dynastic histories of former times. For a while (Nash, Trindex, 1930), it seemed that use of the 214 Kangxi radicals, introduced during the Qing dynasty, was being replaced by the four-corner method.

Internationally, Harvard and other universities were using the method for their book collections, and the KMT government in Nanjing seemed to have selected this numerical system as its standard. It was taught in primary schools to children in Shanghai and other locations during the late 1920s and throughout the 1930s, up to the outbreak of war with Japan in 1937. The four-corner method was extremely popular in government education circles to promote spoken language unification until pronunciation-based systems became fashionable in the mid-1930s.

The first large-scale project to promote spoken language unification was in 1936: Wang Li's 4-volume Mandarin Phonetic System entry, Guoyu Cidian. In 1949 it was re-edited into the MPS Hanyu Da Cidian with Kangxi radical index, and a small Four Corner dictionary was available as the Xin Sijiaohaoma Cidian of 1953. After 1949, limited use of MPS and the original four-corner method continued in the People's Republic of China, until the introduction of pinyin in 1958 and after. Today's Chinese dictionaries still contain MPS characters below each pinyin class entry and sometimes in a phonetics chart in tables (Xinhua Cidian), while main entries are all in Hanyu Pinyin order. There is one all-sijiaohaoma small dictionary (Third Revision, below).

=== Second Revision ===
A minor Second Revision was made during and just after World War II. This was used by most postwar lexicographers including Morohashi Tetsuji, who created his 12-volume Sino-Japanese dictionary, the Dai Kan-Wa jiten and included the four-corner index among several other lookup methods. Oshanin included a four-corner index in his Chinese-Russian dictionary and an edition of the 25 Histories (Ershiwu shi) was published in the early 1950s with a four-corner index volume containing the entire content.

Then, in 1958, with the introduction of pinyin, a small Xin Sijiaohaoma Cidian was produced by the Beijing Commercial Press, but the rapid Han character simplification of the following years made the small (30,000 compound) book obsolete in China. Overseas and in Hong Kong, it remained popular for a number of years as a high speed key to phonetic dictionaries and indexes. It was used by those partly literate in or unfamiliar with Standard Chinese, especially Hanyu Pinyin.

Wang Yunwu produced a Xiao Cidian and Zonghe Cidian in the late 1940s; the latter remains in print in Taiwan, with an auxiliary section of rare characters and gives the telecode number, radical and stroke counts for each character.

=== Third Revision ===
During the Cultural Revolution in mainland China, the four-corner method underwent a radical Third Revision during the compilation of the experimental volume of the Xiandai Hanyu Cidian, Commercial Press, Beijing, 1972. Another medium-sized dictionary, the Xinhua Zidian, appeared with this index as well, but in the late 1990s the four-corner index disappeared from newer editions. Both works now use only the pinyin main entry and multi-door radical index systems that make it possible to look up a character with perhaps a wrong radical (i.e., characters appear redundantly under different radicals) and the number of strokes and variant forms are greatly reduced, and many more people are literate and capable of transcribing Chinese with pinyin. The use of stroke counting and radicals puts memorization of the character ahead of sheer speed in handling it. This method is more supportive of mass literacy than classical scholarship or processing and filing names or characters for the majority in China today.

The four-corner method is ultimately for readers, researchers, editors and fileclerks, not for writers who seek a character that they know in speech or recitation. In China today, a new version of the excellent small Xin Sijiaohaoma Cidian, soft cover from Commercial Press, Beijing, has been available since the late 1970s, updated in several new editions and printings. It also uses the Third Revision.

== Current usage ==
The main purpose of the original four-corner system today is in doing academic research or handling large numbers of characters, terms, index cards, or names. It is also used in computer entry, where a smaller list of items is created to browse from than with other systems. The Xinhua Zidian large type edition is available with a four-corner index for those whose failing eyesight precludes browsing and counting strokes.

In China today, many famous KMT period reference books and collections with four-corner indexes are being reprinted for sale to scholars and those interested in Old Chinese language or historical studies.

== See also ==
=== Context ===
- Chinese character encoding
- Chinese input methods for computers

=== Uses ===
- CKC Chinese Input System, implementation of the four-corner method
- Chinese four-corner index, listing of many Chinese characters sorted by four-corner number

=== Other structural encodings ===
- Chinese telegraph code, a 4-digit system
- SKIP, a structural system for Japanese kanji
- Cangjie method
