= National Languages Committee =

National language regulator in Taiwan

Agency overview
- Formed: 21 April 1919
- Dissolved: 1 January 2013
- Superseding agency: Fourth Sector (Reading and Language Education), Department of Lifelong Education, Ministry of Education
- Jurisdiction: Taiwan
- Agency executive: Tsao Feng-fu, Chairman
- Parent agency: Ministry of Education
- Website: www.edu.tw/mandr

Footnotes

Chinese name
- Traditional Chinese: 國語推行委員會
- Simplified Chinese: 国语推行委员会
- Literal meaning: National Language Promotion Committee
Transcriptions
Standard Mandarin
- Hanyu Pinyin: Guóyǔ Tuīxíng Wěiyuánhuì
- Wade–Giles: Kuo^{2}-yü^{3} T'ui^{1}-hsing^{2} Wei^{3}-yüan^{2}-hui^{4}

Name at creation
- Traditional Chinese: 國語統一籌備會
- Simplified Chinese: 国语统一筹备会
- Literal meaning: Preparatory Commission for the Unification of the National Language
Transcriptions
Standard Mandarin
- Hanyu Pinyin: Guóyǔ Tǒngyī Chóubèi Huì
- Wade–Giles: Kuo^{2}-yü^{3} T'ung^{3}-i^{1} Ch'ou^{2}-pei^{4} Hui^{4}

Second name
- Traditional Chinese: 國語統一籌備委員會
- Simplified Chinese: 国语统一筹备委员会
- Literal meaning: Preparatory Committee for the Unification of the National Language
Transcriptions
Standard Mandarin
- Hanyu Pinyin: Guóyǔ Tǒngyī Chóubèi Wěiyuánhuì
- Wade–Giles: Kuo^{2}-yü^{3} T'ung^{3}-i^{1} Ch'ou^{2}-pei^{4} Wei^{3}-yüan^{2}-hui^{4}

The National Languages Committee was established in 1919 by the Ministry of Education of the Republic of China with the purpose of standardizing and popularizing the usage of Standard Mandarin in the country. The committee was known in English as the Mandarin Promotion Council or the National Languages Promotion Committee until 2003, but the Chinese name has not changed. The phrase Guoyu (國語 "National language") typically refers to Standard Mandarin, but could also be interpreted as referring to "national languages". The reorganization of the Executive Yuan made the duties of the National Languages Committee be transferred to the Department of Lifelong Education's fourth sector (Reading and Language Education) from 2013.

It was created as the Preparatory Commission for the Unification of the National Language by the Republic (then still based in Nanjing) on 21 April 1919. On 12 December 1928, the commission was renamed to the Preparatory Committee for the Unification of the National Language, headed by Woo Tsin-hang and had 31 members. The committee was revived in 1983 as the Mandarin Promotion Council based on Taiwan.

The decisions reached by the Council include:

- Changing the first- and second-grade textbook titles from Guowen (國文 "National Script") to Guoyu (國語 "National language"), on 24 January 1920
- Publishing the Guoyin Zidian (國音字典 "National Pronunciation Dictionary") edited by Woo Tsin-hang, on 24 December 1920. The Guoyin Zidian later became the Mandarin Chinese Dictionary (國語辭典; Guóyǔ Cídiǎn), a comprehensive online and CD-ROM Traditional Chinese Mandarin dictionary.

The Committee for National Language Romanization (羅馬字母拼音研究委員會) under the Council selects and modifies Romanization Systems. The official Mandarin romanization systems in the Republic of China have been:

- Gwoyeu Romatzyh (1928–1984)
- Mandarin Phonetic Symbols II (1984–2002)
- Tongyong Pinyin (2002–2008)
- Hanyu Pinyin (starting on 1 January 2009)

Since the Taiwanization movement took hold in government, the committee also handles:

- Researching the Mandarin spoken in mainland China, often comparatively to that spoken in Taiwan
- Researching the indigenous Formosan languages
- Researching local Sinitic languages, including Taiwanese Hakka and Taiwanese Taigi

== See also ==
- List of language regulators
- Speak Mandarin Campaign (Singapore)
- Taiwanese Mandarin
- Traditional Chinese characters
