= Jack Halpern =

Jack Halpern may refer to:

- Jack Halpern (chemist) (1925–2018), inorganic chemist
- Jack Halpern (linguist) (born 1946), lexicographer, linguist, and unicyclist
