= Transliteration of Chinese =

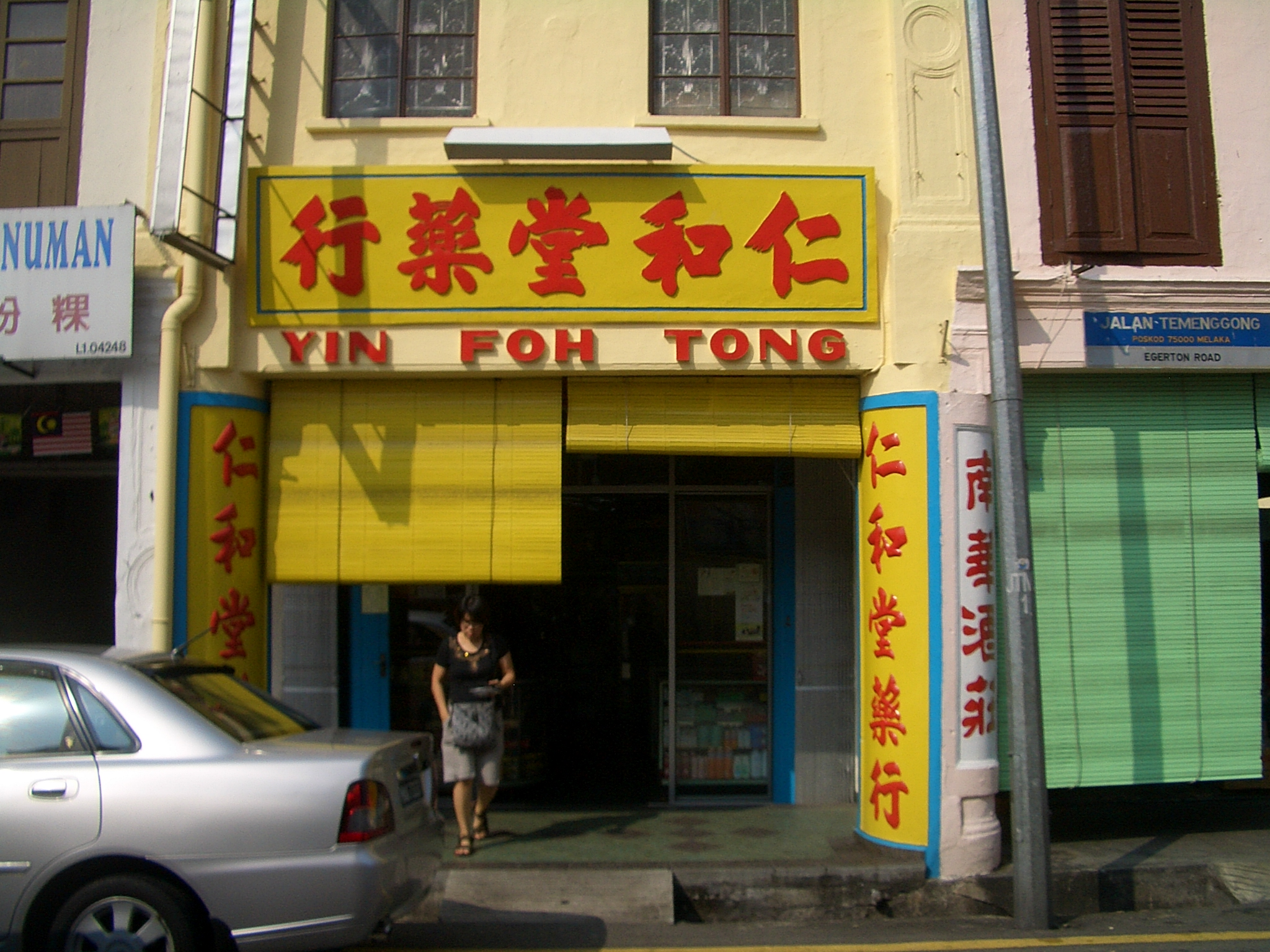
A variety of ad hoc romanisation schemes are used by non-Mandarin speakers in Southeast Asia. The name of this Melaka drugstore, 仁和堂; Rénhétáng, is transcribed as Yin Foh Tong, quite likely reflecting the Hakka pronunciation [jin˩ fɔ˩ tɔŋ˩]

The different varieties of Chinese have been transcribed into many other writing systems.

== General Chinese ==
General Chinese is a diaphonemic orthography invented by Yuen Ren Chao to represent the pronunciations of all major varieties of Chinese simultaneously. It is "the most complete genuine Chinese diasystem yet published". It can also be used for the Korean, Japanese and Vietnamese pronunciations of Chinese characters, and challenges the claim that Chinese characters are required for inter-dialectal communication in written Chinese.

General Chinese is not wholly a romanisation system, but consists of two alternative systems: one uses Chinese characters as a syllabary of 2082 glyphs, and the other is a romanisation system with similar spellings to Gwoyeu Romatzyh.

== Guanhua zimu ==
官話字母; Guānhuà zìmǔ, developed by Wang Zhao (1859–1933), was the first alphabetic writing system for Chinese developed by a Chinese person. This system was modeled on Japanese katakana, which he learned during a two-year stay in Japan, and consisted of letters that were based on components of Chinese characters. After returning to China in 1900, he taught his system in various parts of North China, but the government banned it in 1901.

One of Wang's contemporaries, Lao Naixuan 勞乃宣 (1843–1921), later adapted Guanhua zimu for use in two Wu dialects, those of Ningbo and Suzhou. In doing this, he raised the issue that was ultimately responsible for the failure of all alphabetic writing systems in China: the notion that people should be introduced to literacy in their own local dialects. Such a proposal would both challenge the unique position of the millennia-old writing system and create more than one literary language, destroying China's linguistic unity in both the historical and geographic senses. Because of this, there was strong opposition from the very beginning to proposals of this kind.

== Bopomofo ==
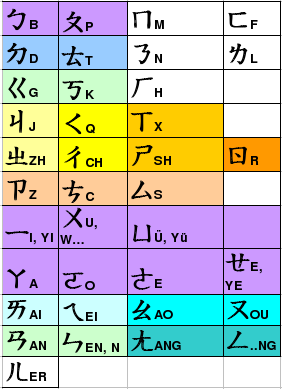
Bopomofo symbols compared to Pinyin

Wu Jingheng, who had developed a "beansprout alphabet", and Wang Zhao, who had developed Guanhua zimu in 1900, and Lu Zhuangzhang were part of the Commission on the Unification of Pronunciation (1912–1913), which developed the rudimentary Jiyin Zimu (記音字母) system of Zhang Binglin into the Mandarin-specific phonetic system now known as Zhuyin Fuhao or bopomofo, proclaimed on 23 November 1918.

The significant feature of bopomofo is that it is composed entirely of ruby characters which can be written beside any Chinese text whether written vertically, right-to-left, or left-to-right. The characters within the bopomofo system are unique phonetic characters, and are not part of the Latin alphabet. In this way, it is not technically a form of romanisation, but because it is used for phonetic transcription the alphabet is often grouped with the romanisation systems.

== Taiwanese kana ==
When Taiwan was under Japanese rule, a katakana-based writing system used to write Holo Taiwanese. It functioned as a phonetic guide to Chinese characters, much like furigana in Japanese, or bopomofo. There were similar systems for other languages in Taiwan as well, including Hakka and Formosan languages.

== Tao pronunciation letters ==
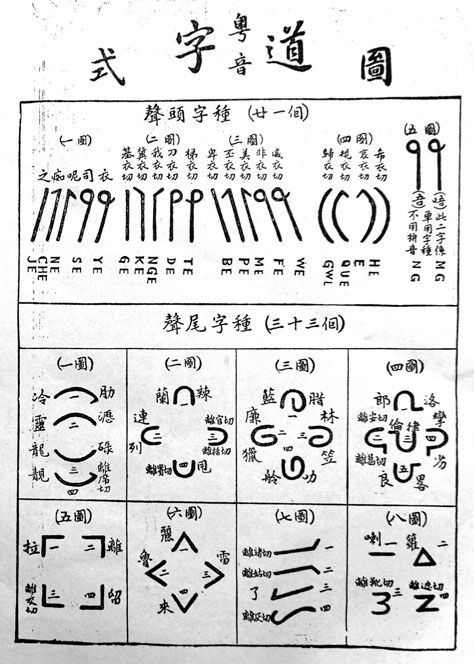
Dao pronunciation letters

Tao pronunciation letters, or Tao HanZi Yin in Chinese, are pronunciation letters invented in 1939 for a Cantonese language dictionary.

== Phags-pa script ==
The Phags-pa script was an alphabet designed by Drogön Chögyal Phagpa at the behest of Kublai Khan during the Yuan dynasty, to unify the empire's various languages. While Phags-pa has aided in the reconstruction of pre-modern Chinese pronunciation, it totally ignores tone.

== Manchu alphabet ==
The Manchu alphabet was used to write Chinese in the Qing dynasty.

== Mongolian alphabet ==
In Inner Mongolia the Mongolian alphabet is used to transliterate Chinese.

== Xiao'erjing ==
Xiao'erjing uses the Arabic alphabet to transliterate Chinese. It is used on occasion by many ethnic minorities who adhere to the Islamic faith in China (mostly the Hui, but also the Dongxiang, and the Salar), and formerly by their Dungan descendants in Central Asia. Soviet writing reforms forced the Dungan to replace xiao'erjing with a Roman alphabet and later a Cyrillic alphabet, which they continue to use up until today.

== Romanisation ==
There have been many Chinese romanisation systems throughout history. Recently, Hanyu Pinyin has become prominent since its introduction in 1982. Other well-known systems include Wade-Giles and Yale.

== Cyrillisation ==
The Russian system for Cyrillisation of Chinese is the Palladius system. The Dungan language, a variety of Mandarin, was once written in the Latin script, but now employs Cyrillic. Some use the Cyrillic alphabet to shorten pinyin—e.g. shì (是) as ш.

Various other countries employ bespoke systems for cyrillising Chinese.

== Braille ==
A number of braille transcriptions have been developed for Chinese. In mainland China, traditional mainland Chinese Braille and Two-Cell Chinese Braille are used in parallel to transcribe Standard Chinese. Taiwanese Braille is used in Taiwan for Taiwanese Mandarin.

In traditional Mainland Chinese Braille, consonants and basic finals conform to international braille, but additional finals form a semi-syllabary, as in bopomofo. Each syllable is written with up to three Braille cells, representing the initial, final and tone, respectively. In practice tone is generally omitted.

In Two-Cell Chinese Braille, designed in the 1970s, each syllable is rendered with two braille characters. The first combines the initial and medial; the second the syllable rime and tone. The base letters represent the initial and rhyme; these are modified with diacritics for the medial and tone.

Like traditional Mainland Chinese Braille, Taiwanese Braille is a semi-syllabary. Although based marginally on international braille, the majority of consonants have been reassigned.

== See also ==
- Fanqie
