= Romanization of Chinese =

Writing Chinese with the Latin alphabet

'National language' (國語; Guóyǔ) written in Traditional and Simplified Chinese characters, followed by Hanyu Pinyin, Gwoyeu Romatzyh, Wade–Giles and Yale romanizations

Romanization of Chinese is the use of the Latin alphabet to transliterate Chinese. Chinese uses a logographic script and its characters do not represent phonemes directly. There have been many systems using Roman characters to represent Chinese throughout history. Linguist Daniel Kane wrote, "It used to be said that sinologists had to be like musicians, who might compose in one key and readily transcribe into other keys." The dominant international standard for Standard Mandarin since about 1982 has been Hanyu Pinyin, invented by a group of Chinese linguists, including Zhou Youguang, in the 1950s. Other well-known systems include Wade–Giles (Beijing Mandarin) and Yale romanization (Beijing Mandarin and Cantonese).

There are many uses for Chinese romanization. Most broadly, it is used to provide a useful way for foreigners who are not skilled at recognizing Chinese script to read and recognize Chinese. It can also be helpful for clarifying pronunciation among Chinese speakers who speak mutually unintelligible Chinese dialects. Romanization facilitates entering characters on standard keyboards. Chinese dictionaries have complex and competing sorting rules for characters: romanization systems simplify the problem by listing characters in their Latin form alphabetically.

== Background ==
The Indian Sanskrit grammarians, who went to China two thousand years ago to work on the translation of Buddhist scriptures into Chinese and the transcription of Buddhist terms into Chinese, discovered the "initial sound", "final sound", and "suprasegmental tone" structure of spoken Chinese syllables. This understanding is reflected in the precise Fanqie system and is the core principle of all modern systems. While the Fanqie system was ideal for indicating the conventional pronunciation of single, isolated characters in written Classical Chinese literature, it was unworkable for the pronunciation of essentially polysyllabic, colloquial spoken Chinese dialects, such as Mandarin.

Aside from syllable structure, it is also necessary to indicate tones in Chinese romanization. Tones distinguish the definition of all morphemes in Chinese, and the definition of a word is often ambiguous in the absence of tones. Certain systems such as Wade–Giles indicate tone with a number following the syllable: ma^{1}, ma^{2}, ma^{3}, ma^{4}. Others, like Pinyin, indicate the tone with diacritics: mā, má, mǎ, mà. Still, the system of Gwoyeu Romatzyh (National Romanization) bypasses the issue of introducing non-letter symbols by changing the letters within the syllable, as in mha, ma, maa, mah, each of which contains the same vowel, but a different tone.

== Uses ==
=== Non-Chinese ===
- Teaching spoken and written Chinese to foreigners.
- Making the actual pronunciation conventions of spoken Chinese intelligible to non-Chinese-speaking students, especially those with no experience of a tonal language.
- Making the syntactic structure of Chinese intelligible to those only familiar with Latin grammar.
- Transcribing the citation pronunciation of specific Chinese characters according to the pronunciation conventions of a specific European language, to allow the insertion of that Chinese pronunciation into a Western text.
- Allowing instant communication in "colloquial Chinese" between Chinese and non-Chinese speakers via a phrase-book.

=== Chinese ===
- Identifying the specific pronunciation of a character within a specific context (Note: Chao (1968, p.172) calls them "split reading characters".) (e.g. 行 as xíng (to walk; behaviour, conduct) or háng (a store)).
- Recitation of Chinese text in one Chinese variety by literate speakers of another mutually unintelligible one, e.g. Mandarin and Cantonese.
- Learning Classical or Modern Chinese.
- Use with a standard QWERTY or Dvorak keyboard.
- Replacing Chinese characters to bring functional literacy to illiterate Chinese speakers.
- Book indexing, dictionary entry sorting, and cataloguing in general.

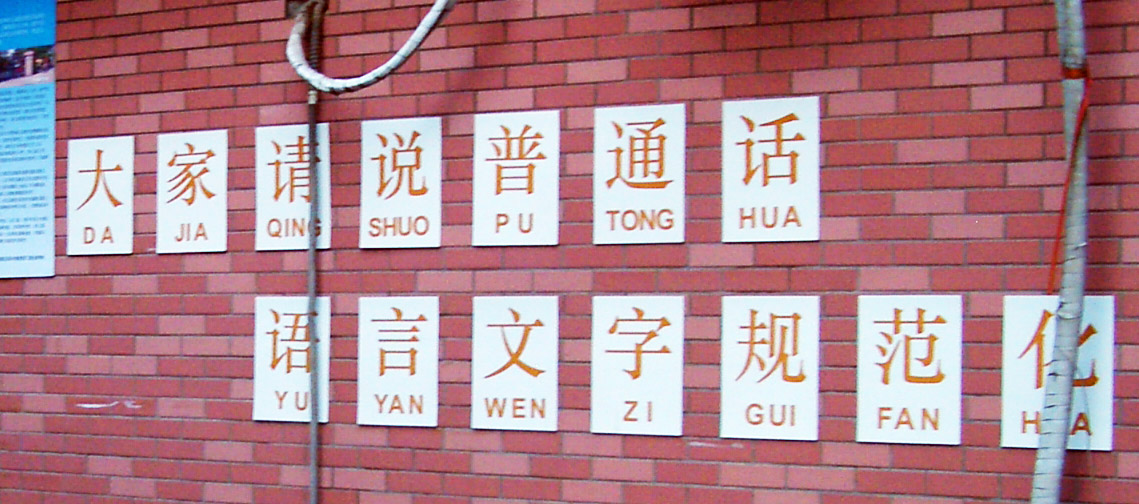
Posters and slogans in and around Chinese schools often have each character annotated with its Standard Chinese reading in Pinyin

== Non-Chinese systems ==
The Wade, Wade–Giles, and Postal systems still appear in the European literature, but generally only within a passage cited from an earlier work. Most European language texts use the Chinese Hanyu Pinyin system (usually without tone marks) since 1979 as it was adopted by the People's Republic of China. (Note: But compare The Grand Scribe's Records by Ssu-ma Chʻien; William H. Nienhauser, Jr., editor; Tsai-fa Cheng ... [et al.], translators. Bloomington 1994-present, Indiana University Press, which uses Wade-Giles for all historic names (including the author).)

=== Missionary systems ===
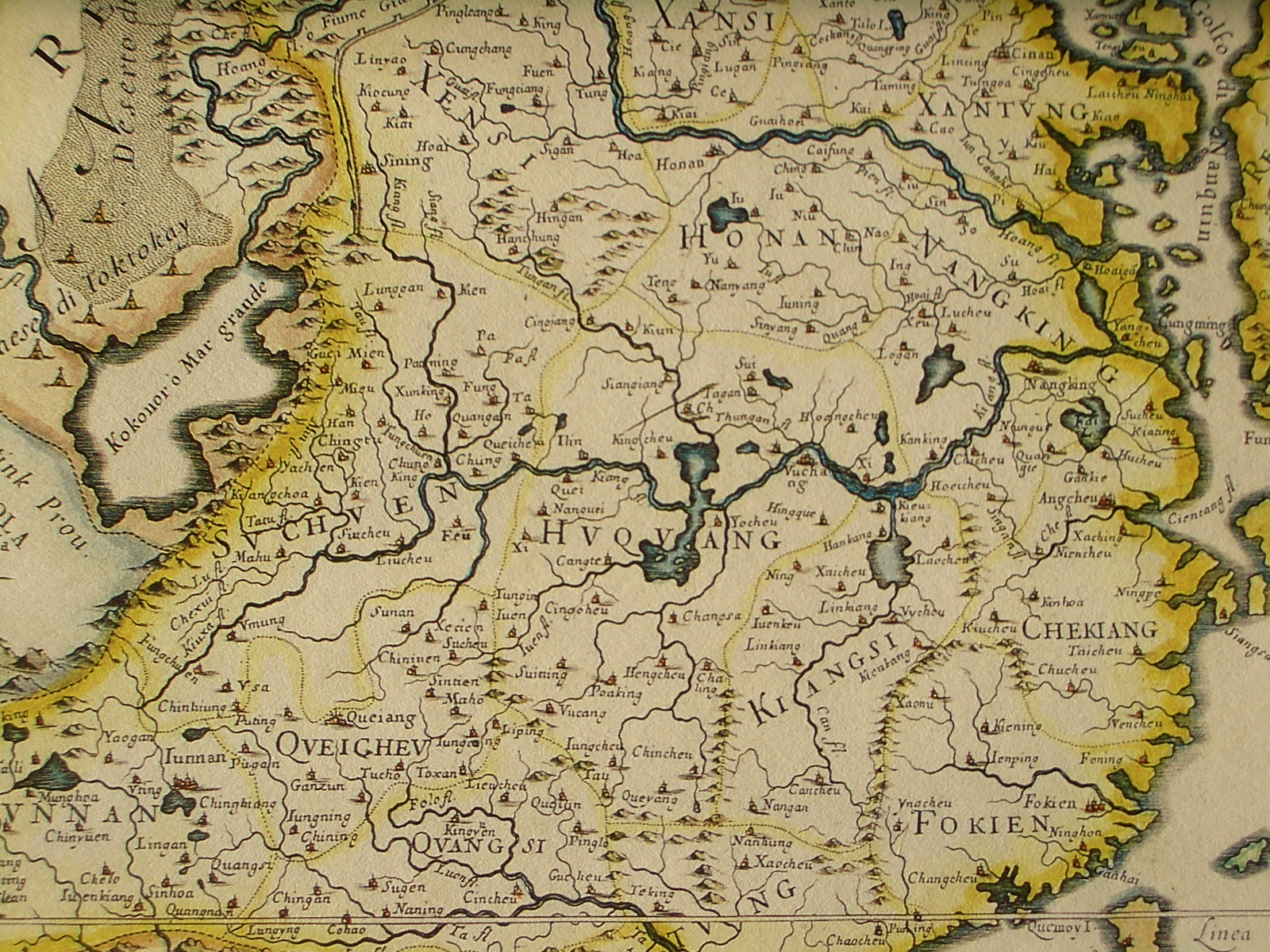
A 17th-century European map using the then-typical transcription of Chinese place names. Note the systematic use of x where pinyin has sh, si where Pinyin has xi, and qu (stylized qv) where Pinyin uses gu

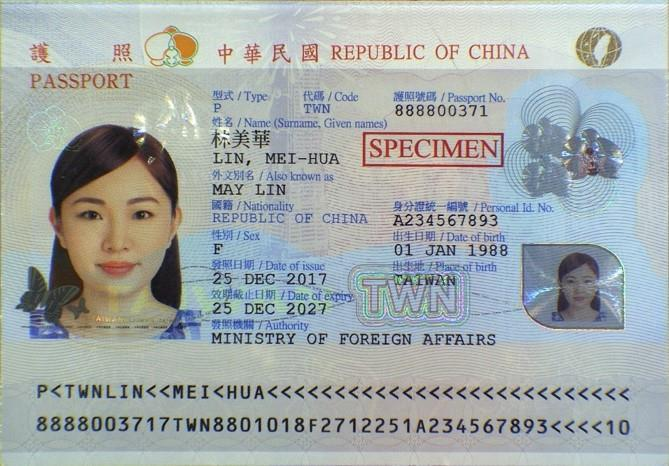
A Taiwanese passport, with the name of the bearer (Lin Mei-hua) romanized for international intelligibility

The first consistent system for transcribing Chinese words in Latin alphabet is thought to have been designed in 1583–1588 by Matteo Ricci and Michele Ruggieri for their Portuguese–Chinese dictionary—the first ever European–Chinese dictionary. The manuscript was misplaced in the Jesuit Archives in Rome, and not re-discovered until 1934. The dictionary was finally published in 2001. During the winter of 1598, Ricci, with the help of his Jesuit colleague Lazzaro Cattaneo (1560–1640), compiled a Chinese–Portuguese dictionary as well, in which tones of the romanized Chinese syllables were indicated with diacritical marks. This work has also been lost but not rediscovered.

Cattaneo's system, with its accounting for the tones, was not lost, however. It was used e.g. by Michał Boym and his two Chinese assistants in the first publication of the original and romanized text of the Xi'an Stele, which appeared in China Illustrata (1667)—an encyclopedic-scope work compiled by Athanasius Kircher.

In 1626 the Jesuit missionary Nicolas Trigault devised a romanization system in his Xiru Ermu Zi (西儒耳目资; 西儒耳目資; Xīrú ěrmù zī; 'Aid to the Eyes and Ears of Western Literati').

In the 1670 Portuguese-language Vocabulario da lingoa mandarina, the Dominican missionary Francisco Varo expanded on Trigault's system. His Spanish-language Vocabulario de la lengua Mandarina was published in 1682 and his Arte de la lengua mandarina, published in 1703, is the earliest known published Chinese grammar.

Later on, many linguistically comprehensive systems were made by the Protestants, such as that used for Robert Morrison's dictionary and the Legge romanization.In their missionary activities they had contact with many languages in Southeast Asia, and they created systems that could be used consistently across all of the languages with which they were concerned. A similar effort for a fully alphabetic system would be made by missionaries working among illiterate overseas Chinese in Southeast Asia who could speak only a local dialect of Chinese. During the Opium War of 1839-42, the Rev. Samuel Dyer of Penang, in collaboration with the Rev. John Stronach, published a work which undertook to dispense with Chinese characters in favor of a phonetic alphabet.

=== Wade–Giles ===
The first system to be widely accepted was the (1859) system of the British diplomat Thomas Wade, (Note: Wade's system, introduced in 1859, was used by the British Consular Service.) revised and improved by Herbert Giles into the (1892) Wade–Giles (威翟式拼音; wēizháishì pīnyīn) system. Apart from the correction of a number of ambiguities and inconsistencies within the Wade system, the innovation of the Wade–Giles system was that it also indicated tones.

The Wade–Giles system used the spiritus asper for aspirated consonants, diacritical marks to mark some vowels, and superscript digits to indicate the four tones.

=== French EFEO system ===
The system devised in 1902 by Séraphin Couvreur of the École française d'Extrême-Orient was used in most of the French-speaking world to transliterate Chinese until the middle of the 20th century, then gradually replaced by Hanyu pinyin.

=== Postal romanization ===
Postal romanization, standardized in 1906, combined traditional spellings, local dialect, and "Nanking syllabary." Nanking syllabary is one of various romanization systems given in a popular Chinese-English dictionary by Herbert Giles. It is based on Nanjing pronunciation. The French administered the post office at this time. The system resembles traditional romanizations used in France. Many of these traditional spellings were created by French missionaries in the 17th and 18th centuries when Nanjing dialect was China's standard. Postal romanization was used only for place names.

=== Yale system ===
The Yale romanization system was created at Yale University during World War II to facilitate communication between American military personnel and their Chinese counterparts. It uses a more regular spelling of Mandarin phonemes than other systems of its day. (Note: For example, it avoids the orthographic alternations between 'y' and 'i', 'w' and 'u', 'wei' and 'ui', 'o' and 'uo', etc. that are part of the Pinyin and Wade-Giles systems.)

This system was used for a long time, because it was used for phrase-books and part of the Yale system of teaching Chinese. The Yale system taught Mandarin using spoken, colloquial Chinese patterns. The Yale system of Mandarin has since been superseded by the Chinese Hanyu Pinyin system.

== Chinese systems ==
=== Qieyin Xinzi ===
The first modern indigenous Chinese romanization system, the Qieyin Xinzi (切音新字; 'New Phonetic Alphabet') was developed in 1892 by Lu Zhuangzhang (1854–1928). It was used to write the sounds of the Xiamen dialect of Southern Min. Some people also invented other phoneme systems.

=== Gwoyeu Romatzyh ===
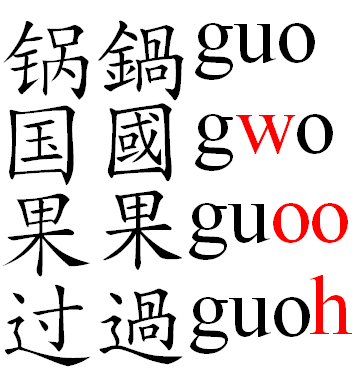
The four tones of guo as written in characters and Gwoyeu Romatzyh. Note the spelling differences, highlighted in red, for each tone.

In 1923, the Kuomintang Ministry of Education instituted a National Language Unification Commission which, in turn, formed an eleven-member romanization unit. The political circumstances of the time prevented any positive outcome from the formation of this unit.

A new voluntary working subcommittee was independently formed by a group of five scholars who strongly advocated romanization. The committee, which met twenty-two times over a twelve-month period (1925–1926), consisted of Zhao Yuanren, Lin Yutang, Qian Xuantong, Li Jinxi (黎錦熙), and one Wang Yi. They developed the Gwoyeu Romatzyh (國語羅馬字; Guóyǔ Luómǎzì; 'National Language Romanization') system, proclaimed on 26 September 1928. The most distinctive aspect of this new system was that, rather than relying upon marks or numbers, it indicated the tonal variations of the "root syllable" by a systematic variation within the spelling of the syllable itself. The entire system could be written with a standard QWERTY keyboard.

...the call to abolish [the written] characters in favor of a romanized alphabet reached a peak around 1923. As almost all of the designers of [Gwoyeu Romatzyh] were ardent supporters of this radical view, it is only natural that, aside from serving the immediate auxiliary role of sound annotation, etc., their scheme was designed in such a way that it would be capable of serving all functions expected of a bona fide writing system, and supersede [the written Chinese] characters in due course.

Despite the fact that it was created to eventually replace Chinese characters, and that it was constructed by linguists, Gwoyeu Romatzyh was never extensively used for any purpose other than delivering the pronunciation of specific Chinese characters in dictionaries. (Note: Such as, for example, Lin (1972), and Simon (1975).) The complexity of its tonal system was such that it was never popular. (Note: Seybolt and Chiang (1979) believe that a second reason was that, subsequent to the promulgation of the Gwoyeu Romatzyh system in 1928, "the increasingly conservative National Government, led by the Kuomintang, lost interest in, and later suppressed, efforts to alter the traditional script". Norman (1988): "In the final analysis, Gwoyeu Romatzy failed not because of defects in the system itself, but because it never received the official support it would have required to succeed; perhaps more importantly, it was viewed by many as the product of a group of elitist enthusiasts, and lacked any real popular base of support.")

=== Latinxua Sin Wenz ===
Work towards designing Latinxua Sin Wenz began in Moscow as early as 1928, when the Soviet Scientific Research Institute on China sought to create a means through which the large Chinese population living in the Far East of the Soviet Union could be made literate, facilitating their further education.

From the very outset, it was intended that the Latinxua Sin Wenz system, once established, would supersede the Chinese characters. The Latin alphabet was chosen over the Cyrillic alphabet because the former was thought to better serve their purposes. Unlike Gwoyeu Romatzyh, with its complex spelling rules to indicate tones, Latinxua Sin Wenz does not indicate tones at all: while GR could in principle write many different tonal systems, it had been pegged to the national standard language also promoted by the Republican government, while Latinxua Sin Wenz was simply adapted to create new systems fit for various varieties of Chinese varieties.

The eminent Moscow-based Chinese scholar Qu Qiubai (1899–1935) and the Russian linguist V. S. Kolokolov (1896–1979) devised a prototype romanization in 1929. In 1931, a coordinated effort between the Soviet sinologists B. M. Alekseev, A. A. Dragunov, and A. G. Shprintsin, with the Chinese scholars Qu Qiubai, Wu Yuzhang, Lin Boqu (林伯渠), Xiao San, Wang Xiangbao, and Xu Teli based in Moscow established Latinxua Sin Wenz. The system was supported by a number of Chinese intellectuals such as Guo Moruo and Lu Xun, and trials were conducted among 100,000 Chinese immigrant workers for about four years (Note: The "Soviet experiment with latinized Chinese came to an end [in 1936]" when most of the Chinese immigrant workers were repatriated to China (Norman, 1988, p. 261). DeFrancis (1950) reports that "despite the end of Latinxua in the U.S.S.R. it is the opinion of the Soviet scholars who worked on the system that it was an unqualified success" (p.108).) and later, from 1940 to 1942, in the communist-controlled regions of Shaanxi, Gansu, and Ningxia. The ROC government meanwhile felt compelled to ban its use between 1936 and 1938. In November 1949, the railways in northeastern China adopted Latinxua Sin Wenz for all telecommunications.

For a time, the system was very important in spreading literacy in northern China, and more than 300 publications, totaling 500,000 issues, were printed in Latinxua Sin Wenz. Ultimately, promotion of the system ceased, because of its proposed target of superseding logographic Chinese characters altogether, which was deemed too radical:

In 1944 the latinization movement was officially curtailed in the communist-controlled areas [of China] on the pretext that there were insufficient trained cadres capable of teaching the system. It is more likely that, as the communists prepared to take power in a much wider territory, they had second thoughts about the rhetoric that surrounded the latinization movement; in order to obtain the maximum popular support, they withdrew support from a movement that deeply offended many supporters of the traditional writing system.

In 2002, Zhou Youguang claimed that Joseph Stalin persuaded Mao Zedong against the complete romanization of Chinese during Mao's visit to Moscow in December 1949.

=== Hanyu Pinyin ===
In October 1949, the Association for Reforming the Chinese Written Language was established. Wu Yuzhang (one of the creators of Latinxua Sinwenz) was appointed chairman. All of the members of its initial governing body belonged to either the Latinxua Sinwenz movement (Ni Haishu (倪海曙), Lin Handa (林汉达), etc.) or the Gwoyeu Romatzyh movement (Li Jinxi (黎锦熙), Luo Changpei, etc.). For the most part, they were also highly trained linguists. Their first directive (1949–1952) was to take "the phonetic project adopting the Latin alphabet" as "the main object of [their] research"; linguist Zhou Youguang was put in charge of this branch of the committee.

In a speech delivered on 10 January 1958, (Note: Two different translations of the speech are at Zhou (1958) and Zhou (1979).) Zhou Enlai observed that the committee had spent three years attempting to create a non-Latin Chinese phonetic alphabet (they had also attempted to adapt Zhuyin Fuhao) but "no satisfactory result could be obtained" and "the Latin alphabet was then adopted". He also emphatically stated:

In future, we shall adopt the Latin alphabet for the Chinese phonetic alphabet. Being in wide use in scientific and technological fields and in constant day-to-day usage, it will be easily remembered. The adoption of such an alphabet will, therefore, greatly facilitate the popularization of the common speech [i.e. Putonghua (Standard Chinese)].

The development of the Pinyin (Chinese: 汉语拼音; pinyin: hànyǔ pīnyīn; lit. 'Chinese Phonetic Writing') system was a complex process involving decisions on many difficult issues, such as:

- Should Hanyu Pinyin's pronunciation be based on that of Beijing?
- Was Hanyu Pinyin going to supersede Chinese written characters altogether, or would it simply provide a guide to pronunciation? (Note: If intended to supersede the Chinese written characters, then the ease of writing the pronunciation (including tones) in a cursive script would be critical.)
- Should the traditional Chinese writing system be simplified?
- Should Hanyu Pinyin use the Latin alphabet? (Note: Mao Zedong and the Red Guards were strongly opposed to the use of the Latin alphabet.)
- Should Hanyu Pinyin indicate tones in all cases (as with Gwoyeu Romatzyh)?
- Should Hanyu Pinyin be Mandarin-specific, or adaptable to other dialects and other Chinese varieties?
- Was Hanyu Pinyin to be created solely to facilitate the spread of Putonghua throughout China? (Note: For example, an American delegation that visited China in 1974 reported that "the principal uses of pinyin at present are to facilitate the learning of Chinese characters, and to facilitate the speed of Putonghua popularization, primarily for Chinese-speakers but also for minorities and foreigners.")

Despite the fact that the "Draft Scheme for a Chinese Phonetic Alphabet" published in "People's China" on 16 March 1956 contained certain unusual and peculiar characters, the Committee for Research into Language Reform soon reverted to the Latin Alphabet, citing the following reasons:

- The Latin alphabet is extensively used by scientists regardless of their native tongue, and technical terms are frequently written in Latin.
- The Latin alphabet is simple to write and easy to read. It has been used for centuries all over the world. It is easily adaptable to the task of recording Chinese pronunciation.
- While the use of the Cyrillic alphabet would strengthen ties with the U.S.S.R., the Latin alphabet is familiar to most Russian students, and its use would strengthen the ties between China and many of its Southeast Asian neighbours who are already familiar with the Latin alphabet.
- As a response to Mao Zedong's remark that "cultural patriotism" should be a "weighty factor" in the choice of an alphabet: despite the fact that the Latin alphabet is "foreign" it will serve as a strong tool for economic and industrial expansion; and, moreover, the fact that two of the most patriotic Chinese, Qu Qiubai and Lu Xun, were such strong advocates of the Latin alphabet indicates that the choice does not indicate any lack of patriotism.
- On the basis that the British, French, Germans, Spanish, Polish and Czechoslovaks have all modified the Latin alphabet for their own usage, and because the Latin alphabet is derived from the Greek alphabet, which, in turn came from Phoenician and Egyptian, there is as much shame attached to using the Latin alphabet as there is in using Arabic numerals and the conventional mathematical symbols, regardless of their point of origin.

The movement for language reform came to a standstill during the Cultural Revolution and nothing was published on language reform or linguistics from 1966 to 1972. The Pinyin subtitles that had first appeared on the masthead of the People's Daily newspaper and the Red Flag journal in 1958 did not appear at all between July 1966 and January 1977.

In its final form Hanyu Pinyin:

- was used to indicate pronunciation only
- was exclusively based on the pronunciation of the Beijing dialect
- included tone marks
- embodied the traditional "initial sound", "final sound", and "suprasegmental tone" model
- was written in the Latin alphabet

Hanyu Pinyin has developed from Mao's 1951 directive, through the promulgation on 1 November 1957 of a draft version by the State Council, (Note: It was adopted and promulgated by the Fifth Session of the First National People's Congress on 11 February 1958. The 1957 draft was titled "First draft of phonetic writing system of Chinese (in Latin alphabet", while the 1958 version was titled "Phonetic scheme of Chinese". The crucial difference was the removal of the term "Wenzi" (writing system); this explicitly indicated that the system was no longer intended to eventually replace Chinese written characters, but only to act as an auxiliary to assist pronunciation.) to its final form being approved by the State Council in September 1978, (Note: As a consequence of this approval, Pinyin began to be used in all foreign language publications for Chinese proper names, as well as by Foreign Affairs and the Xinhua News Agency [from 1 January 1979].) to being accepted in 1982 by the International Organization for Standardization as the standard for transcribing Chinese.

John DeFrancis has described Mao Zedong's belief that pinyin would eventually replace Chinese characters, but this has not come to pass, and in fact such a plan had already ceased together with the end of Latinxua Sinwenz movement.

=== Jyutping ===
The Linguistic Society of Hong Kong Cantonese Romanization Scheme, (Note: Chinese: 香港語言學學會粵語拼音方案; Jyutping: hoeng1 gong2 jyu5 jin4 hok6 hok6 wui2 jyut6 jyu5 ping3 jam1 fong1 on3) also known as Jyutping, is a romanisation system for Cantonese developed in 1993 by the Linguistic Society of Hong Kong (LSHK).

=== Tongyong Pinyin ===
Tongyong Pinyin is a system with some usage in Taiwan. It was introduced by the linguist Yu Bor-chuan in 1998 and was the official romanization of Mandarin in Taiwan between 2002 and 2008. The system was developed in part to make the Taiwanese identity more distinct from China's, the latter of which uses Hanyu Pinyin. Whether to use this system is considered a political issue in Taiwan.

== Variations in pronunciation ==
"The Chinese and Japanese repository" stated that romanization would standardize the different pronunciations Chinese often had for one word, which was common for all mostly unwritten languages. Contributor Rev James Summers wrote, in 1863:

"Those who know anything of the rude and unwritten languages of the other parts of the world will have no difficulty in imagining the state of the spoken dialects of China. The most various shades of pronunciation are common, arising from the want of the analytic process of writing by means of an alphabet. A Chinaman has no conception of the number or character of the sounds which he utters when he says mau-ping; indeed one man will call it maw (mor)-bing, and another mo-piang, without the first man perceiving the difference. By the people themselves these changes are considered to be simple variations, which are of no consequence. And if we look into the English of Chaucer's or of Wickliffe's time, or the French of Marco Polo's age, we shall find a similar looseness and inattention to correct spelling, because these languages were written by few, and when the orthography was unsettled. Times are changed. Every poor man may now learn to read and write his own language in less than a month, and with a little pains he may do it correctly with practice. The consequence is that a higher degree of comfort and happiness is reached by many who could never have risen above the level of the serf and the slave without this intellectual lever. The poor may read the gospel as well as hear it preached, and the cottage library becomes a never-failing treasury of profit to the labouring classes."

== See also ==
- Comparison of Standard Chinese transcription systems
- Transliteration of Chinese
- Transcription into Chinese characters
- Romanization of Japanese
