= Lu Zhuangzhang =

Chinese scholar and reformer (1854–1928)

- Born: 1854 Tong'an, Xiamen, Fujian
- Died: December 28, 1928 (aged 73–74) Xiamen
- Occupation: linguist, translator, lexicographer

Chinese name
- Traditional Chinese: 盧戇章
- Simplified Chinese: 卢戆章
Transcriptions
Standard Mandarin
- Hanyu Pinyin: Lú Zhuàngzhāng
- Wade–Giles: Lu Chuang-chang
Southern Min
- Hokkien POJ: Lô͘ Gōng-chiong

Courtesy name
- Chinese: 祥瑛
Transcriptions
Standard Mandarin
- Hanyu Pinyin: Xiángyīng
Southern Min
- Hokkien POJ: Siông-eng

Lu Zhuangzhang (1854–1928) was a Chinese scholar notable for creating the Qieyin xinzi (切音新字 'new phonetic alphabet'), the first romanization system for Chinese designed by a native speaker, which he published in 1892. Lu's work stimulated Chinese interest in script reform, where Chinese characters were seen as inefficient in comparison to alphabetic writing. Lu was an influential and prolific Chinese language reformer during the late Qing dynasty (1644–1911) and early Republic of China.

== Life ==
Lu was born in Fujian, on the southeast coast of China, and was raised in Xiamen—where Christian missionaries had introduced a romanization of the local variety of Chinese that was widely used in newspapers and books. When he was 18, Lu Zhuangzhang failed the imperial examination for the civil service, and he subsequently converted to Christianity and sought out opportunities in the missionary community. In 1875, at the age of 21, Lu moved to Singapore, where he studied English intensively. After returning to Xiamen in 1879, he worked as a language tutor and translator for Chinese and foreigners. John MacGowan of the London Missionary Society recruited Lu to help compile the English and Chinese Dictionary of the Amoy Dialect (1883), which used the romanization system from Carstairs Douglas (1876).

While assisting MacGowan, Lu extensively worked with the missionaries' system of huayin (話音; 'speech-sound script') that used Latin alphabet letters to transcribe local varieties of Chinese, and came to believe that he could develop a better system. The speech-sound script required several letters to convey a pronunciation, making some word spellings longer than others. Lu devised a streamlined system of 55 distinctly pronounced zimu (字母; 'alphabet letters'), symbols largely derived from the Latin alphabet. Based on the traditional Chinese fanqie method of indicating pronunciation with one Chinese character for the initial consonant and another for the final sound, Lu's system spelled each syllable with two zimu signs denoting the initial and final.

Lu Zhuangzhang's Qieyin Xinzi system was designed for Southern Min varieties of Chinese, specifically the Xiamen, Zhangzhou, and Quanzhou varieties, but he said that it could also be adapted for the other languages of China. Lu believed that his romanization method was easy to learn and claimed that a student could pick it up in a few weeks. However, when he tried teaching it to his family members, few could master the complex spelling rules, principles, and exceptions. The historical linguist Luo Changpei found Lu's scheme cumbersome and esoteric, "neither Chinese nor Western".

After two decades of work on developing his New Phonetic Alphabet, Lu's innovative Yimu liaoran chujie: Zhongguo qie yin xin zi Xia qiang (一目了然初階: 中国切音新字廈腔 "First Steps in Being Able to Understand at a Glance: Chinese new phonetic script in the Amoy topolect]") was published in 1892. Victor H. Mair, a sinologist and professor of Chinese at the University of Pennsylvania, calls it "the first book written by a Chinese which presented a potentially workable system of spelling for a Sinitic language" and says Lu is now viewed as the "father of script reform". Among other improvements, Lu's Chinese romanization system links up syllables into words and separates them with spaces.

Lu's 1892 preface to the Yimu liaoran chujie explains the New Phonetic Alphabet's pragmatic advantages.

Chinese characters are perhaps the most difficult of all characters in the whole world today…. Normally, when one writes poems and essays, one uses only a little over 5,000 of these characters. But if he wants to recognize these several thousand characters, even the most intelligent person will have to spend more than ten years of hard work. Herein lies the suitability of spelling. In my humble opinion, the wealth and strength of a nation are based on science; the advancement of science is based on the desire for learning and understanding principle of all men and women, young and old. Their being able to desire learning and understand principle is based on the spelling of words. Once they have become familiar with the letters and the methods of spelling, they can read any word by themselves without a teacher. Because the written and spoken word are the same, when they read with their mouths they comprehend in their hearts. Furthermore, because the strokes of the letters are simple, they are easy to recognize and easy to write, saving more than ten years of a person's life. This time may be dedicated to mathematics, physics, chemistry, and all kinds of practical learning. What worry would there then be for the wealth and strength of the nation? In the whole world today, except for China, all the other nations mostly use 20 or 30 letters for spelling.... Therefore, in the civilized nations of Europe and America, all men and women over the age of ten, even in remote villages and isolated areas, are able to read.... What is the reason for this? It is because they spell their words, because the written and the spoken word are the same, and because the strokes of the letters are simple... That men and women of foreign nations all can read is due to spelling.

The publication of Lu's work opened the floodgates for new systems of Chinese transliteration, and inspired others to develop 29 phonetic schemes between 1892 and 1910. When Lu later supervised a language school in colonial Taiwan, he realized the flaws with his Qieyin Xinzi and attempted to redesign the system on the basis of the Japanese kana syllabary, but there were already too many competing schemes.

Lu Zhuangzhang continued to work on reforming written Chinese, and in 1912 he was appointed as one of 55 members in the Commission on the Unification of Pronunciation, which developed Zhang Binglin's Jiyin Zimu (記音字母 "Alphabetic Phonetic Notation") into the Bopomofo transcription system, which the Beiyang government adopted in 1918.

The linguist, sinologist, and lexicographer John DeFrancis dedicated his innovative ABC Chinese-English Dictionary to Lu Zhuangzhang and five other advocates of Chinese script reform, and described him as the "Pioneer reformer whose publication in 1892 of alphabetic schemes for several varieties of Chinese marked the beginning of Chinese interest in reform of the writing system".
