= CJK Dictionary Institute =

Japanese dictionary compilation company

The CJK Dictionary Institute
- Industry: Computational lexicography, lexical database compilation
- Founder: Jack Halpern
- Headquarters: Niiza, Saitama, Japan
- Website: www.cjk.org

The CJK Dictionary Institute, Inc. (CJKI) is a Japan-based dictionary compilation company headed by Jack Halpern. It specializes in Chinese, Japanese, Korean, and Arabic lexicography, as well as the compilation and maintenance of large-scale lexical databases.

Notable works include the forthcoming CJKI Arabic Learner's Dictionary and the Kodansha Kanji Learner's Dictionary, known for introducing SKIP (System of Kanji Indexing by Patterns), a popular method of Kanji indexing.

In addition to printed works, CJKI produces language-oriented mobile applications for iOS, Android, and various electronic dictionaries. These include a large number of technical dictionaries covering such subjects as mechanical engineering, economics, and medicine.

CJKI maintains and licenses large-scale lexical databases covering a total of approximately 24 million entries in Japanese, Chinese, Korean, and Arabic. Notably, the Database of Arabic Names (DAN) contains over 6.5 million entries and is designed for security applications (e.g. terrorist watchlists, anti-money laundering systems, customer identity management systems) and general natural language processing. CJKI’s databases are currently licensed to a number of software development and IT companies including Fujitsu, Sony, IBM, Google, Microsoft, Yahoo, and Amazon.

CJKI is also responsible for producing academic papers regarding technological and linguistic issues pertaining to Chinese, Japanese, Korean, and Arabic. These include papers discussing natural language processing and the use of dictionaries in language education. A 2009 paper introduces the CJKI Arabic Romanization System (CARS), a new Arabic romanization including indications of word stress and vowel neutralization.

== Jack Halpern ==
Jack Halpern is the founder and CEO of the CJK Dictionary Institute. A linguist and entrepreneur, Halpern is a speaker of over 10 languages and Editor in Chief of the Kodansha Kanji Learner’s Dictionary. In addition to his work with CJKI, Halpern is an avid unicyclist, founding and serving as Executive Director for International Development for the International Unicycling Federation. He has been living in Japan for over 50 years.

== See also ==
- Jack Halpern
- The Kodansha Kanji Learner's Dictionary
- SKIP
