= The Kodansha Kanji Learner's Dictionary =

Japanese kanji dictionary by Jack Halpern

Old dictionary cover

The Kodansha Kanji Learner's Dictionary is a kanji dictionary based on the New Japanese-English Character Dictionary by Jack Halpern at the CJK Dictionary Institute and published by Kenkyūsha. Originally published in 1999 (with a minor update in 2001), a Revised and Updated Edition was issued on 2013, reflecting the new changes in the jōyō kanji mandated in 2010. This Revised and Expanded Edition increases the number of kanji entries from 2,230 to 3,002, as well as changing all pronunciations from romaji to kana. In 2021, a second edition of the Revised and Expanded edition was published, taking into account an increase in the number of jōyō kanji which had occurred earlier in 2020, while also providing relevant compound words. There also exist electronic forms of this dictionary for both iOS and Android. A more extensive version of this dictionary by the CJK Dictionary Institute is also published by Kodansha called The Kodansha Kanji Dictionary.

The dictionary arranges entries according to an original system called SKIP (System of Kanji Indexing by Patterns). The dictionary also has indexing by radical and character readings.

== SKIP ==
The SKIP method encodes Kanji into four main categories: Left-Right, Up-Down, Enclosure, and Whole; and then by stroke count (or by subtype of the Whole category).

The SKIP method used by The Kodansha Kanji Learner's Dictionary is an original system for indexing kanji, meant to be accessible to those who have no prior knowledge of them. Instead of organizing kanji based on radicals, they are organized based on pattern. Based on how a kanji can be divided into sections, they are grouped into four main categories: Left-Right (1), Up-Down (2), Enclosure (3), and Solid (4). Users then count the number of strokes in each segment, and use them to determine the kanji's SKIP number. Since December 12, 2014, the SKIP coding system and all established SKIP codes have been released for public use under a Creative Commons licence.

=== Determining SKIP numbers ===
==== 1) Left-Right ====
Left-Right kanji are those which can be broken down into sections segmented vertically such as 明 (bright), which can be broken down into the left segment 日 (sun) and the right segment 月 (moon). Thus, 明 would be in the first main category (Left-Right), would have four strokes in its left segment and four in its right, giving it a SKIP number 1-4-4.

In the above example, the kanji can be broken down into two segments, both of which are actual radicals, but such does not need to be the case. The kanji 測 (measure) can be broken down into three segments 氵 (water), 貝 (shell money), and 刂 (knife). In such cases, the leftmost discrete element is treated as the left segment, and the rest of the kanji as the right segment. Therefore, 測 is split into the left segment of 氵 and the right segment of 則 (rule), and the resulting SKIP number is 1-3-9.

==== 2) Up-Down ====
Up-Down kanji are kanji that can be broken down into sections segmented horizontally such as 男 (male), which can be broken down into the up segment 田 (rice field) and the down segment 力 (power). Thus, 男 would be in the second main category (Up-Down), would have five strokes in its up section and two strokes in its down section, giving it a SKIP number of 2-5-2.

Again, the up and down sections do not necessarily need to be radicals, and can consist of more than two segments. The kanji 薬 (medicine) can be split into three segments. In such cases, the topmost discrete element is the up segment, while the remainder of the kanji (楽) is the down segment. Thus, 薬 has a SKIP number of 2-3-13.

==== 3) Enclosure ====
Enclosure kanji are those where one element borders or surrounds other elements of the kanji. Such elements can border other elements on two sides (近 and 症), three sides (風 and 区), or completely surround the other elements (囲). In SKIP numbers for enclosure kanji, the bordering element's stroke count comes first, followed by the stroke count of the elements inside the enclosure. Thus, the SKIP number of 風 (wind) is 3-2-7.

==== 4) Solid ====
Solid kanji are kanji that cannot be easily broken down into elements based on the patterns of the other categories. Often these kanji are formed from a single radical. Solid kanji are broken down into four sub-patterns:

1. Top line – Kanji which have a prominent horizontal stroke at the top, e.g. 耳 (ear) and 子 (child).
2. Bottom line – Kanji which have a prominent horizontal stroke at the bottom, e.g. 上 (up) and 丘 (hill).
3. Through line – Kanji which have a prominent vertical stroke through the middle, e.g. 本 (book) and 中 (middle).
4. Others – Kanji which cannot be placed in the preceding sub-patterns, e.g. 女 (woman) and 丸 (circle).

SKIP numbers for Solid kanji follow the following pattern:

- Main category (in this case, 4 for whole kanji)
  - Stroke count for whole kanji
    - Subpattern

Thus, the SKIP number of 子 is 4-3-1 and the SKIP number for 本 is 4-5-3.

The Solid SKIP codes put the stroke count second, and the subpattern third, in order to aid in linear searching (such as in the paper dictionary). Since it is straightforward to count the entire kanji's strokes, while classifying its subpattern can be subjective, this ordering makes it more likely a Solid kanji will be found, even if the reader misclassifies its subpattern.

=== Aids in searching ===
In its index for kanji, pages where a user might erroneously expect a kanji to be located (either because of incorrect classification or incorrect stroke count) are cross-referenced with their correct SKIP number.

For example, 門 is correctly a 1 (Left-Right) kanji split into two 4-stroke parts, making it 1-4-4. But it is also cross-referenced at 3-8-0 as an incorrect classification of an Enclosure (corresponding to radical 169, ⾨), with eight containing strokes and zero contained strokes. Since many kanji sharing this radical (such as 開, 3-8-4, or 閉, 3-8-3) follow this 3-8-... pattern, 門 itself is also cross-referenced there.

== See also ==
- Four corner method, a structural encoding for Chinese characters
