= CKC Chinese Input System =

The CKC Chinese Input System is a Chinese input method for computers that uses the four corner method to encode characters.

The encoding uses a maximum of four digits ("0" - "9") to represent a Chinese character. All possible shapes of strokes that forms any given Chinese character are classified into ten groups, each represented by one of the ten possible digits 0-9. Chinese characters can then be input by following the order in which the strokes are identified at the four corners of the character. As a result of this simplicity in coding using the ten numeric digits, users typically need to use only a numeric keypad to input Chinese.

Implementations for both Traditional and Simplified Chinese are available, though the coding principle applies to both. In other words, users only need to be trained once and the skill can be applied equally well to both Traditional and Simplified Chinese version of the CKC Chinese Input System.

Training courses on the CKC Chinese Input System are provided by training centres in CKC Centre for the Development of Information Technology for Chinese Language Teaching of The Hong Kong Institute of Education, IVE Haking Wong and of Hong Kong University.

== Mapping ==
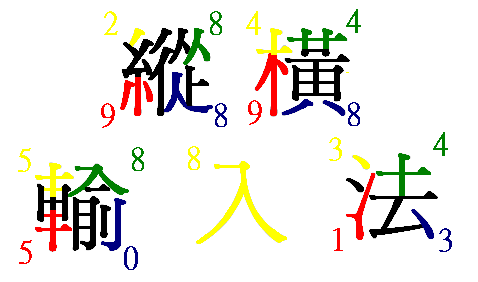
Example of CKC Chinese Input System.

The mapping between groups of stokes and their corresponding digits 0-9 can be described by the following:

一橫二豎三點捺
叉四插五方塊六
七角八八九是小
撇與左勾都是零

This means: 1 represents a horizontal stroke, 2 a vertical or diagonal stroke, 3 a dot or left-to-right diagonal stroke, 4 two strokes in a cross shape, 5 three or more strokes in which one stroke intersects all others, 6 a box-shape, 7 where a stroke turns a corner, 8 the shape of the Chinese character 八 and its inverted form, 9 the shape of the Chinese character 小 and its inverted form, and 0 a right-to-left diagonal or left hook stroke.

== Coding principle : single character ==
1. Order of coding : start from the top left-hand corner, then the top right-hand corner, next followed by the bottom left-hand corner and finally the bottom right-hand corner. Example : CKC code for the character "的" is 0760
2. When there are more than 1 way to encode, use one which covers more strokes of the character. Example : the CKC code for the character "綜 " is 2399 as opposed to 2393.
3. Encode each of the shapes ONCE only. Example : the CKC code for the character "香" is 06 as opposed to 0066.
4. When there are more than 1 way to encode, code of the strokes at the left-most or right-most side of the character is preferred. Example : the CKC code for the character "非" is 1111 as opposed to 2222.
5. Strokes positioned at the top most of the character is given priority to code rather than those at lower position. Example : The CKC code for the character "成" is 5307 as opposed to 7307.

== Software availability ==
The software can be downloaded from The CKC Chinese Input System web site and can be run on the Microsoft Windows environment. Other platforms such as Linux, Palm and Pocket PC are under development.

== WebCKC ==
It is also possible to use the CKC Chinese Input System without installing it on a PC. The WebCKC allows any PC connected to Internet using the MS Internet Explorer to input Chinese Characters using the CKC Chinese Input System.

You can try out the traditional Chinese version or the Simplified Chinese version . Note that you need to use keyboard with numeric keypad in order to input Chinese with this method.

Text entered are stored in the clipboard and therefore ready to be pasted to any desired application.

== See also ==
- Four corner method, the encoding that CKC uses
