= Chinese telegraph code =

Code for telegraphy using Chinese characters

- Traditional Chinese: 中文電報碼
- Simplified Chinese: 中文电报码
Transcriptions
Standard Mandarin
- Hanyu Pinyin: Zhōngwén diànbàomǎ

Alternative Chinese name
- Traditional Chinese: 中文電碼
- Simplified Chinese: 中文电码
- Literal meaning: Chinese electric code
Transcriptions
Standard Mandarin
- Hanyu Pinyin: Zhōngwén diànmǎ

The Chinese telegraph code, Chinese telegraphic code, or Chinese commercial code is a four-digit character encoding enabling the use of Chinese characters in electrical telegraph messages.

== Encoding and decoding ==
A codebook is provided for encoding and decoding the Chinese telegraph code. It shows one-to-one correspondence between Chinese characters and four-digit numbers from 0000 to 9999. Chinese characters are arranged and numbered in dictionary order according to their radicals and strokes. Each page of the book shows 100 pairs of a Chinese character and a number in a 10×10 table. The most significant two digits of a code matches the page number, the next digit matches the row number, and the least significant digit matches the column number, with 1 being the column on the far right. For example, the code 0022 for the character 中, meaning "center", is given in page 00, row 2, column 2 of the codebook, and the code 2429 for the character 文, meaning "script", is given in page 24, row 2, column 9. The PRC's Standard Telegraph Codebook provides codes for approximately 7,000 Chinese characters.

Senders convert their messages written with Chinese characters to a sequence of digits according to the codebook. For instance, the phrase 中文信息, meaning "information in Chinese", is rendered into the code as 0022 2429 0207 1873. It is transmitted using Morse code. Receivers decode the Morse code to get a sequence of digits, chop it into an array of quadruplets, and then decode them one by one referring to the book. Because non-digit characters were not used, the Morse codes for digits could be simplified, for example one's several consequent dashes could be replaced with a single dash.

The codebook also defines codes for Zhuyin alphabet, Latin alphabet, Cyrillic alphabet, and various symbols including special symbols for months, days in a month, and hours.

Senders may translate their messages into numbers by themselves or pay a small charge to have them translated by a telegrapher. (Note: The Tianjin Communications Corporation (2004) in the PRC charges RMB 0.01 per character for their encoding service, compared to their domestic telegraph rate of RMB 0.13 per character.) Chinese expert telegraphers used to remember several thousands of codes of the most frequent use.

The Standard Telegraph Codebook gives alternative three-letter codes (AAA, AAB, ...) for Chinese characters. It compresses telegram messages and cuts international fees by 25% as compared to the four-digit code. (Note: Domestic telegrams are charged by the number of Chinese characters, not digits or Latin characters, hence this compression technique is only used for international telegrams.)

=== Use ===
Looking up a character given a number is straightforward: page, row, column. However, looking up a number given a character is more difficult, as it requires analyzing the character. The four-corner method was developed in the 1920s to allow people to more easily look up characters by the shape, and remains in use today as a Chinese input method for computers.

== History ==
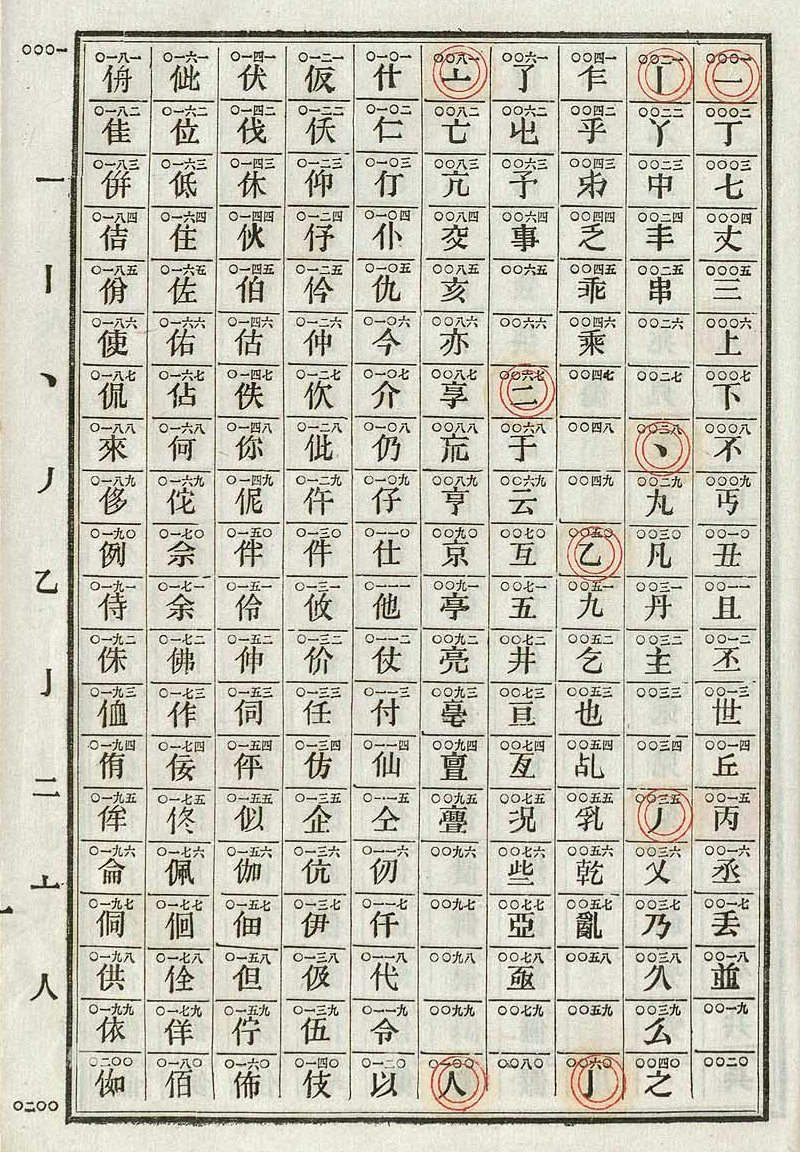
Viguier's Chinese telegraph codes from 0001 to 0200

Telegraphy arrived in China in 1870s. The first Chinese telegraph code was invented following the introduction of telegraphy to China in 1871, when the Great Northern Telegraph Company laid a cable between Shanghai and Hong Kong, linking the territory of the Qing dynasty to the international telegraph system. Septime Auguste Viguier, a French customs officer in Shanghai, published a codebook of Chinese characters in 1872, supplanting an earlier work by Danish astronomer Hans Schjellerup. Schjellerup and Viguier selected a small subset of commonly used characters and assigned each character a four-digit code between 0001 and 9999. As a result, tens of thousands of Chinese characters were simply not included in telegraphy.

In consideration of the former code's insufficiency and disorder of characters, Zheng Guanying compiled a new codebook in 1881. It remained in effect until the Ministry of Transportation and Communications printed a new book in 1929. In 1933, a supplement was added to the book.

After the establishment of the People's Republic of China in 1949, the codebook forked into two different versions, due to revisions made in the mainland China and Taiwan independently from each other. The mainland version, the Standard Telegraph Codebook, adopted simplified characters in 1983.

== Application ==
The Chinese telegraph code can be used for a Chinese input method for computers. Ordinary computer users today hardly master it because it needs a lot of rote memorization. However, the related four-corner method, which allows one to look up characters by shape, is used.

Both the Hong Kong and Macau Resident Identity Cards display the Chinese telegraph code for the holder's Chinese name. Business forms provided by the government and corporations in Hong Kong often require filling out telegraph codes for Chinese names. The codes help to input Chinese characters into a computer. When filling out the DS-160 form for a US visa, the Chinese telegraph codes are required if the applicant has a name in Chinese characters.

Chinese telegraph code is used extensively in law enforcement investigations worldwide that involve ethnic Chinese subjects where variant phonetic spellings of Chinese names can create confusion. Dialectical differences (Mr. Wu in Mandarin becomes Mr. Ng in Cantonese (吳先生); while Mr. Wu in Cantonese would become Mr. Hu in Mandarin (胡先生)) and differing romanization systems (Mr. Xiao in the Hanyu Pinyin system, and Mr. Hsiao in the Wade–Giles system) can create serious problems for investigators, but can be remedied by application of Chinese telegraph code. For instance, investigators following a subject in Taiwan named Hsiao Ai-kuo might not know this is the same person known in mainland China as Xiao Aiguo and Hong Kong as Siu Oi-kwok until codes are checked for the actual Chinese characters to determine all match as CTC: 5618/1947/0948 for 萧爱国 (simplified) / 蕭愛國 (traditional). (Note: For more information, refer to: A Law Enforcement Sourcebook of Asian Crime and Cultures: Tactics and Mindsets, Author Douglas D. Daye, Chapter 20)

== See also ==
- Code point
- Four-corner method, a four-digit structural encoding method designed to aid lookup of telegraph codes
- Telegraph code
- Wiktionary page for Standard Telegraph Codebook (标准电码本（修订本）), 1983

== References and bibliography ==
- Baark, Erik. 1997. Lightning Wires: The Telegraph and China's Technological Modernization, 1860–1890. Greenwood Press. ISBN 0-313-30011-9.
- Baark, Erik. 1999. "Wires, codes, and people: The Great Northern Telegraph Company in China." In China and Denmark: Relations Since 1674, edited by Kjeld Erik Brødsgaard and Mads Kirkebæk, Nordic Institute of Asian Studies, pp. 119–152. ISBN 87-87062-71-2.
- Jacobsen, Kurt. 1997. "Danish watchmaker created the Chinese Morse system." Morsum Magnificat, 51, pp. 14–19.
- Lín Jìnyì (林 進益 / 林 进益), editor. 1984. 漢字電報コード変換表 [Chinese character telegraph code conversion table] (In Japanese). Tokyo: KDD Engineering & Consulting.
- Ministry of Post and Telecommunications (中央人民政府郵電部 / 中央人民政府邮电部), editor. 1952. 標準電碼本 / 标准电码本 [Standard telegraph codebook], 2nd edition (In Chinese). Beijing: Ministry of Post and Telecommunications.
- Reeds, James A. 2004. Chinese telegraph code (CTC). Accessed on December 25, 2006.
- Shanghai City Local History Office (上海市地方志办公室). 2004. 专业志: 上海邮电志 [Industrial history: Post and communications history in Shanghai] (In Chinese). Accessed on December 22, 2006.
- Stripp, Alan. 2002. Codebreaker in the Far East. Oxford University Press. ISBN 0-19-280386-7.
- Viguier, Septime Auguste (威基謁 / 威基谒). 1872. 電報新書 / 电报新书 [New book for the telegraph] (In Chinese). Published in Shanghai.
- Viguier, Septime Auguste (威基謁 / 威基谒) and Dé Míngzài (德 明在). 1871. 電信新法 / 电信新法 [New method for the telegraph] (In Chinese).
- Yasuoka Kōichi (安岡 孝一) and Yasuoka Motoko (安岡 素子). 1997. Why is "唡" included in JIS X 0221? (In Japanese). IPSJ SIG Technical Report, 97-CH-35, pp. 49–54.
- Yasuoka Kōichi (安岡 孝一) and Yasuoka Motoko (安岡 素子). 2006. 文字符号の歴史: 欧米と日本編 [A history of character codes in Japan, America, and Europe] (In Japanese). Tokyo: 共立出版 Kyōritsu Shuppan ISBN 4-320-12102-3.
