= Mandarin Phonetic Symbols II =

Romanization system for Mandarin

- Traditional Chinese: 國語注音符號第二式
- Simplified Chinese: 国语注音符号第二式
Transcriptions
Standard Mandarin
- Hanyu Pinyin: Guóyǔ Zhùyīn Fúhào Dì'èr Shì
- Bopomofo: ㄍㄨㄛˊ ㄩˇ ㄓㄨˋ ㄧㄣ ㄈㄨˊ ㄏㄠˋ ㄉㄧˋ ㄦˋ ㄕˋ
- Wade–Giles: Kuo^{2}-yü^{3} Chu^{4}-in^{1} Fu^{2}-hau^{4} Ti^{4}-er^{4} Shih^{4}
- MPS2: Guóyǔ Jùyīn Fúhàu Dì'èr Shr̀
Yue: Cantonese
- Yale Romanization: Gwok'yúh Jyuyām Fùhhóu Daihyih Sīk
- Jyutping: gwok3 jyu5 zyu3 jam1 fu4 hou6*2 dai6 ji6 sik1

Mandarin Phonetic Symbols II (MPS II) is a romanization system formerly used in Taiwan. It was created to replace the complex Gwoyeu Romatzyh system, which used tonal spelling—and to co-exist with the Wade–Giles romanization as well as bopomofo. It is sometimes referred to as Gwoyeu Romatzyh 2 or GR2.

== History ==
Based on the earlier and more complex Gwoyeu Romatzyh, the tentative version of MPS II was released on May 10, 1984, by the Ministry of Education under the Chiang Ching-kuo administration. After two years of feedback from the general public, the official version was established on January 28, 1986. To distinguish bopomofo (注音符號; zhùyīn fúhào) from MPS II, the former is officially called "Mandarin Phonetic Symbols I" (國語注音符號第一式).

Despite its official status for almost two decades until it was replaced by Tongyong Pinyin in 2002, MPS II existed only in some governmental publications (such as travel brochures and dictionaries). However, MPS II was not used for the official romanized names of Taiwanese places, though many road signs replaced during this period use it. It never gained the same status as did Wade–Giles. It is virtually unused overseas.

== Table ==
=== Initials ===
| | | Bilabial | | Labiodental | Alveolar | | Retroflex | | Alveolo-palatal | Velar |
| | | Voiceless | Voiced | Voiceless | Voiceless | Voiced | Voiceless | Voiced | Voiceless | Voiceless |
|---|---|---|---|---|---|---|---|---|---|---|
| Nasal | | | m [m] ㄇ m | | | n [n] ㄋ n | | | | |
| Plosive | Unaspirated | b [p] ㄅ b | | | d [t] ㄉ d | | | | | g [k] ㄍ g |
| Plosive | Aspirated | p [pʰ] ㄆ p | | | t [tʰ] ㄊ t | | | | | k [kʰ] ㄎ k |
| Affricate | Unaspirated | | | | tz [ts] ㄗ z | | j [ʈʂ] ㄓ zh | | j [tɕ] ㄐ j | |
| Affricate | Aspirated | | | | ts [tsʰ] ㄘ c | | ch [ʈʂʰ] ㄔ ch | | ch [tɕʰ] ㄑ q | |
| Fricative | | | | f [f] ㄈ f | s [s] ㄙ s | | sh [ʂ] ㄕ sh | | sh [ɕ] ㄒ x | h [x] ㄏ h |
| Liquid | | | | | | l [l] ㄌ l | | r [ɻ~ʐ] ㄖ r | | |

=== Finals ===
| | | Coda | | | | | | | | | | | |
| | | ∅ | | | /i/ | | /u/ | | /n/ | | /ŋ/ | | /ɻ/ |
|---|---|---|---|---|---|---|---|---|---|---|---|---|---|
| Medial | ∅ | r/z [ɨ] ㄭ -i | e [ɤ] ㄜ e | a [a] ㄚ a | ei [ei] ㄟ ei | ai [ai] ㄞ ai | ou [ou] ㄡ ou | au [au] ㄠ ao | en [ən] ㄣ en | an [an] ㄢ an | eng [əŋ] ㄥ eng | ang [aŋ] ㄤ ang | er [aɚ] ㄦ er |
| Medial | /j/ | i [i] ㄧ i | ie [je] ㄧㄝ ie | ia [ja] ㄧㄚ ia | | | iou [jou] ㄧㄡ iu | iau [jau] ㄧㄠ iao | in [in] ㄧㄣ in | ian [jɛn] ㄧㄢ ian | ing [iŋ] ㄧㄥ ing | iang [jaŋ] ㄧㄤ iang | |
| Medial | /w/ | u [u] ㄨ u | uo [wo] ㄨㄛ uo | ua [wa] ㄨㄚ ua | uei [wei] ㄨㄟ ui | uai [wai] ㄨㄞ uai | | | uen [wən] ㄨㄣ un | uan [wan] ㄨㄢ uan | ung [ʊŋ] ㄨㄥ ong | uang [waŋ] ㄨㄤ uang | |
| Medial | /y/ | iu [y] ㄩ ü | iue [ɥe] ㄩㄝ üe | | | | | | iun [yn] ㄩㄣ ün | iuan [ɥɛn] ㄩㄢ üan | iung [jʊŋ] ㄩㄥ iong | | |

== Features ==
- Indication of tone by respelling, as used in Gwoyeu Romatzyh, is eliminated. Syllables are spelled like its tone one for non-nasal initials, and like tone two for nasal initials. Tone is then marked with four diacritics identical to Zhuyin's.
- The romanization of the consonants is identical to Gwoyeu Romatzyh's.
- The empty rime /ɨ/ is treated in the same way as Yale romanization:
  - It uses r for both:
    - ㄖ (pinyin r), and
    - what is written in pinyin as i after zh, ch, sh, r. (The use of r has a tonal diacritic on it and is always final.)
  - It uses z for both:
    - ㄗ (pinyin z), and
    - what is written in pinyin as i after z, c, s. (The use of z has a tonal diacritic on it and is always final.)
    - The z is not written after tz (no tzz), however. Tz corresponds to Pinyin zi (and Yale dz).
- Like GR, -iou, -uen, and -uei are all written out, unlike the Pinyin/Wade -iu, -un, and -ui.
- GR's au persists, as opposed to the ao of Pinyin, Wade-Giles, and the later Tongyong Pinyin.
- GR's iu (Pinyin ü) is written as -iu and yu (alone).
- GR's -ong is spelled now -ung (like Wade-Giles).
- GR's el is spelled now er (like Pinyin).
- Y- and w- are added to or replace i and u (respectively), similarly to Gwoyeu Romatzyh and identical to Pinyin.

An example phrase, "The second type of Chinese phonetic symbols":

| Hanzi | 國語注音符號第二式 |
| Pinyin | guóyǔ zhùyīn fúhào dì'èr shì |
| MPS II | guó-yǔ jù-yīn fú-hàu dì-èr shr̀ |
| GR | gwoyeu juh'in fwuhaw dih'ell shyh |

Spaces are generally used in place of hyphens, except in personal names, which use hyphens in between the syllables of the given names.

| Preceded by Gwoyeu Romatzyh | Official romanization adopted by the Republic of China (Taiwan); 1986-2002 | Succeeded by Tongyong Pinyin |
