= Jack Halpern (linguist) =

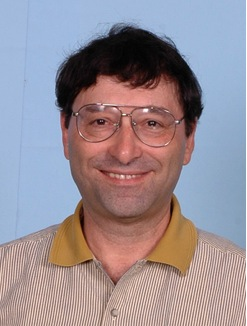
- Born: 1946 (age 79–80); Germany
- Occupations: Lexicographer, linguist
- Notable work: The Kodansha Kanji Learner's Dictionary; The New Japanese–English Character Dictionary
- Spouse: Michal Halpern
- Children: 2

Jack Halpern (Japanese: 春遍雀來, ハルペン・ジャック; Arabic: جاك هلبرن) is a German lexicographer based in Japan, specializing in Chinese characters namely kanji. He is best known as editor-in-chief of the Kodansha Kanji Learner's Dictionary and as the inventor of the SKIP system for kanji lookup. Halpern is also an active unicyclist, having served as founder and president of the International Unicycling Federation. He currently resides in Saitama, Japan.

== Personal life ==
Halpern was born in 1946 in Germany. Through his early years, he moved through six different countries including France, Brazil and the United States, picking up numerous local languages. After studying astronomy at university, he began a business offering technical translation services. In 1968, while traveling, Halpern met a Japanese citizen who introduced him to kanji, beginning his lifelong interest in Chinese characters. He moved to Japan with his family in 1973, where he continues to live with his wife and two children. There, he has founded the Japan Yiddish Club, currently the only Yiddish-teaching organization in Japan. Through the club, he continues to teach Yiddish lessons at the Jewish Community Center in Shibuya, Tokyo.

Within Japan, Halpern is well known for his public appearances. In addition to having published regular columns in Japanese magazines and periodicals and having appeared on numerous variety shows, Halpern has given hundreds of public lectures on lexicography, language-learning, and other language- and culture-related topics. He was formerly a fellow at Showa Women's University.

Halpern plays the quena, a traditional Andean flute. He has played with the Japan-based Grupo Tortuguita since 2002.

Halpern is a noted polyglot with speaking ability in twelve languages: English, Japanese, Hebrew, Yiddish, Portuguese, Spanish, German, Chinese, Esperanto, Standard Arabic, Palestinian Arabic, and Vietnamese. His reading ability extends to Ladino, Papiamento, and Aramaic.

== CJK Dictionary Institute ==
Halpern is CEO of the CJK Dictionary Institute (CJKI), which specializes in dictionary compilation for Chinese, Japanese, Korean, Arabic, and other languages. With CJKI, Halpern has published various lexicographical tools for language learners including the Kodansha Kanji Learner's Dictionary and the New Japanese–English Character Dictionary. CJKI has also produced a large number of technical dictionaries covering such topics as mechanical engineering, economics, and medicine. Aside from dictionary compilation, CJKI compliles large-scale lexical databases covering a total of approximately 50 million entries in Japanese, Chinese, Korean, and Arabic. CJKI has also developed comprehensive databases for Standard Arabic (ArabLEX) and for Arabic dialects (DiaLEX), including Egyptian Arabic.

== Unicycling ==
Halpern is an avid unicyclist. In addition to being a former Guinness world record holder for fastest 100-mile (160 km) run on a unicycle, he has played a major role in the spread of unicycling as a sport throughout Japan, the United States, Canada, China, and other countries. In 1978, he introduced unicycling to Japan by founding the Japan Unicycle Club (JUC), for which he served as the first chairman. Subsequently, he served as executive director of the club's successor, the Japan Unicycling Association (JUA), until 2012. His book, Anyone Can Ride a Unicycle (誰でも乗れる一輪車の本), credited as the first Japanese-language book to explain how to ride the unicycle, is still included with purchases of certain models of unicycle in Japan. In 1980, Halpern founded the International Unicycling Federation, serving as its first elected president. From 1984 until 2001, Halpern served continuously as either president and later vice president of the federation, helping to popularize competitive unicycling throughout the world. As a part of this effort, he helped to organize the first ten UNICON conferences from 1984 until 2000. In 1993, Halpern introduced competitive unicycling to China by organizing the first Great Wall Unicycle Marathon.

== Selected works ==
Halpern has written many academic and research papers and is the author of dozens of books and articles

- Halpern, Jack (1978). 不思議な日本語、不思議な日本人 Fushigi na Nihongo, Fushigi na Nihonjin 'The Inscrutable Japanese and Their Inscrutable Language'. Tokyo: Seiya Shoten.
- Halpern, Jack (1982). Linguistic Analysis of the Function of Kanji in Modern Japanese. 27th International Conference of Orientalists in Tokyo.
- Halpern, Jack (1985). "Kenkyusha's New Japanese-English Character Dictionary". Calico Journal.
- Halpern, Jack (1987). 漢字の再発見 Kanji no Saihakken 'Rediscovering Chinese Characters'. Tokyo: Shodensha.
- Halpern, Jack (1990). 新漢英辞典 New Japanese-English Character Dictionary (Sixth Printing). Tokyo: Kenkyusha.
- Halpern, Jack (1990). "New Japanese-English Character Dictionary: A Semantic Approach to Kanji Lexicography". Euralex '90 Proceedings. Benalmádena (Málaga): Bibliograf: 157–166.
- Halpern, Jack; Nomura, Masaaki; Fukuda, Atsushi (1994). "Building a Comprehensive Chinese Character Database". Euralex '94 Proceedings. International Congress on Lexicography in Amsterdam.
- Halpern, Jack (1998). Building a Comprehensive Database for the Compilation of Integrated Kanji Dictionaries and Tools. 43rd International Conference of Orientalists in Tokyo.
- Halpern, Jack; Kerman, Jouni (1999). The Pitfalls and Complexities of Chinese to Chinese Conversion. Fourteenth International unicode Conference in Cambridge, Massachusetts.
- Halpern, Jack (1998). Building a Comprehensive Database for the Compilation of Integrated Kanji Dictionaries and Tools. 43rd International Conference of Orientalists in Tokyo.
- Halpern, Jack (2000). The Challenges of Intelligent Japanese Searching. Tokyo.
- Halpern, Jack (December 2002). The Kodansha Kanji Learner's Dictionary. Tokyo: Kodansha International.
- Halpern, Jack (2002). Lexicon-based Orthographic Disambiguation in CJK Intelligent Information Retrieval. COLING 2022.
- Halpern, Jack (2006). "The Contribution of Lexical Resources to Natural Language Processing of CJK Languages". Chinese Spoken Language Processing. Lecture Notes in Computer Science. Vol. 4274. pp. 768–780. doi:10.1007/11939993_77. ISBN 978-3-540-49665-6.
- Halpern, Jack (2007). The Challenges and Pitfalls of Arabic Romanization and Arabization. The Second Workshop on Computational Approaches to Arabic Script-based Languages.
- Halpern, Jack (2009). Lexicon-Driven Approach to the Recognition of Arabic Named Entities. 2nd International Conference on Arabic Language Resources and Tools.
- Halpern, Jack (2011). Pedagogical Lexicography Applied to Chinese and Japanese Learner's Dictionaries. ASIALEX 2011.
