= Gwoyeu Romatzyh =

1926 romanization system for Chinese

- Comparison between Gwoyeu Romatzyh (top) and pinyin (bottom) for Gwoyeu Romatzyh's official name 國音字母第二式 ('Second Pattern of the National Alphabet'; middle)
- Script type: Alphabet romanization
- Creator: National Languages Committee: Yuen Ren Chao; Lin Yutang; Li Jinxi; Qian Xuantong; Wang Yi (汪怡)
- Created: 1925–1926
- Official script: Republic of China (1928–1986)
- Languages: Standard Chinese

Chinese name
- Traditional Chinese: 國語羅馬字
- Simplified Chinese: 国语罗马字
- Literal meaning: National language romanization
Transcriptions
Standard Mandarin
- Hanyu Pinyin: Guóyǔ Luómǎzì
- Bopomofo: ㄍㄨㄛˊ ㄩˇ ㄌㄨㄛˊ ㄇㄚˇ ㄗˋ
- Gwoyeu Romatzyh: Gwoyeu Romatzyh
- Wade–Giles: Kuo^{2}-yü^{3} Lo^{2}-ma^{3}-tzu^{4}
- Tongyong Pinyin: Guó-yǔ Luó-mǎ-zìh
- Yale Romanization: Gwóyǔ Lwómǎdz̀
- IPA: [kwǒỳ lwǒmàtsɹ̩̂]
Yue: Cantonese
- Yale Romanization: Gwok-yu Lòh-máh-jih
- Jyutping: Gwok3 jyu3 Lo4 ma5 zi6
- IPA: [kʷɔ̄ːk jȳː lɔ̀ː mɐ̬ tɕìː]
Southern Min
- Hokkien POJ: Kok-gí Lô-má-jī

Official name
- Traditional Chinese: 國音字母第二式
- Simplified Chinese: 国音字母第二式
- Literal meaning: Second pattern of the national alphabet
Transcriptions
Standard Mandarin
- Hanyu Pinyin: Guóyīn zìmǔ dì'èr shì
- Bopomofo: ㄍㄨㄛˊ ㄧ ㄣㄗˋ ㄇㄨˇ ㄉㄧˋ ㄦˋ ㄕˋ
- Gwoyeu Romatzyh: Gwoin tzyhmuu dihell shyh
- Wade–Giles: Kuo^{2}-yin^{1} tzu^{4}-mu^{3} ti^{4}-erh^{4} shih^{4}
- Tongyong Pinyin: Guó-yin zìh-mǔ dì-èr shìh
- Yale Romanization: Gwóyīn dz̀mǔ dìèr shr̀
- IPA: [kwǒín tsîmù tîɤɻ ʂî]
Yue: Cantonese
- Yale Romanization: Gwok-yām jih-móuh daih-yih sīk
- Jyutping: Gwok3 jam1 zi6 mou5 dai6 ji6 sik1
- IPA: [kʷɔk̚˧ jɐm˥ tsi˨ mɔw˩˧ tɐj˨ ji˨ sɪk̚˥]

Gwoyeu Romatzyh (Note: Traditional Chinese: 國語羅馬字; simplified Chinese: 国语罗马字; pinyin: Guóyǔ Luómǎzì; lit. 'National language romanization') (abbr. GR) is a system for writing Standard Chinese using the Latin alphabet. It was primarily conceived by Yuen Ren Chao, who led a group of linguists on the National Languages Committee in refining the system between 1925 and 1926. In September 1928, it was adopted by the Republic of China as the national romanization system for Standard Chinese. GR indicates the four tones of Standard Chinese by varying the spelling of syllables, a method originally proposed by team member Lin Yutang (1895–1976). Distinct sets of spellings are assigned to syllables in GR according to particular rules. This differs from approaches used by other systems to denote tones, like the numerals used by the earlier Wade–Giles system, or the diacritics used by the later Hanyu Pinyin system.

Despite support from linguists both in China and overseas—including some early proponents who hoped it would eventually replace Chinese characters altogether—GR never achieved widespread use among the Chinese public, who generally lacked interest in the system or viewed it with hostility due to its complex spelling rules. In places where GR had gained traction, it was eventually replaced—largely by Hanyu Pinyin, which became the international standard during the 1980s, and which follows principles originally introduced by GR. Widespread adoption of GR was also hindered by its narrow calibration to the Beijing dialect, during a period when China lacked the strong central government needed to impose use of a national spoken language.

From 1942 to 2000, a small number of reference works published in Hong Kong and overseas also used the system, and Chao would use it throughout his later linguistics work, including in his most influential publications. Chao said that tonal spelling could possibly aid students of Chinese learning to articulate tones. However, later study of tonal accuracy in students has not substantiated Chao's hypothesis.

== History ==
=== Background ===
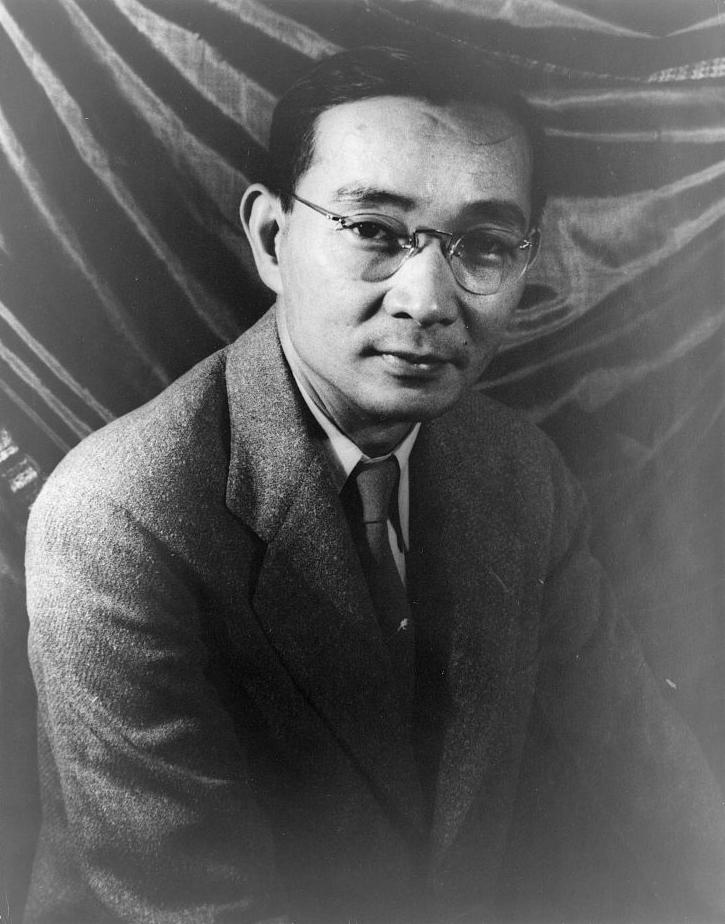
Lin Yutang, who first proposed tonal spelling, in 1939

The Republic of China was founded in 1912, following the overthrow of the imperial Qing dynasty in the Xinhai Revolution. During the final decades of the Qing, liberal reformers among the Chinese intelligentsia had begun seeking ways to modernize the country's institutions. Proposed language reforms included the replacement of Literary Chinese as China's primary written language with a written vernacular that more closely reflected ordinary speech. Meanwhile, even though Mandarin was spoken in an official capacity by the imperial bureaucracy in the north of the country, most of China's population spoke mutually unintelligible varieties of Chinese; many also saw adoption of a single spoken dialect nationwide as being necessary for China's modernization. The tumultuous Commission on the Unification of Pronunciation held in 1913 resulted in the adoption of a "national pronunciation" (Note: 國音 (guóyīn; 'national pronunciation') was often used interchangeably with 國語 (guóyǔ; 'national language').) designed as a compromise featuring characteristics of numerous varieties spoken across China; however, this meant a form of speech that was itself artificial and spoken by no one, and the struggling Beiyang government had few means to promote its use among the general population.

In 1916, the linguist Yuen Ren Chao was among the first to propose—in an English-language essay co-authored with the poet Hu Shih—that Chinese characters should be replaced with an alphabet designed to write the sounds of a national form of Chinese. By 1921, Chao had joined the National Languages Committee, and was tasked with the creation of audio recordings demonstrating the new national pronunciation, which he did in New York City. However, it had become increasingly clear that the Republican government was not capable of promoting the national pronunciation, and during the 1920s efforts shifted instead towards basing the national language on Mandarin as spoken in Beijing. While Chao had supported the compromise national pronunciation, factors including his correspondence with the prominent linguist Bernhard Karlgren encouraged his work on a new romanization system attuned to the Beijing dialect. Tonal spelling, Gwoyeu Romatzyh's most distinctive feature, was first suggested to Yuen Ren Chao by Lin Yutang; by 1922, Chao had already established the main principles of the system. During 1925 and 1926, its details were developed by a team of five linguists under the auspices of the National Languages Committee: Chao, Lin, Li Jinxi, Qian Xuantong, and Wang Yi (汪怡).

=== Official status and adoption ===
On 26 September 1928, Gwoyeu Romatzyh was officially adopted by the Republic's nationalist government—led at the time by the Kuomintang (KMT). The corresponding entry in Chao's diary, written in GR, reads G.R. yii yu jeou yueh 26 ry gong buh le. Hoo-ray!!! ("G.R. was officially announced on September 26. Hooray!!!") It was intended for GR to be used alongside the existing bopomofo system, hence its designation as the "Second Pattern of the National Alphabet". (Note: Gwoin tzyhmuu dihell shyh (國音字母第二式; Guóyīn zìmǔ dì'èr shì)) Both systems were used to indicate the revised standard of pronunciation in the new official Vocabulary of National Pronunciation for Everyday Use of 1932. (Note: Gwoin charngyonq tzyhhuey (國音常用字彙; Guóyīn chángyòng zìhuì)) The designers of Gwoyeu Romatzyh generally represented what has been termed the "Romanization" movement, one among several interested in large-scale reform of the Chinese writing system; many within the Romanization movement sought to adopt Gwoyeu Romatzyh as a primary, practical script for the language. During the 1930s, two short-lived attempts were made to teach Gwoyeu Romatzyh to railway workers and peasants in Henan and Shandong. Support for GR was confined to a small number of trained linguists and sinologists, including Qian Xuantong and Luo Changpei in China and Walter Simon in England. During this period, GR faced increasing hostility because of the complexity of its tonal spelling. A competing "Latinization" movement coalesced around leaders like Qu Qiubai, and the Latinxua Sin Wenz systems—often identifying with the Communists, and likewise opposing the KMT. Conversely, Karlgren criticized GR for its lack of phonetic rigour. Ultimately, like Latinxua Sin Wenz, GR failed to gain widespread support, principally because the "national" language was too narrowly based on the Beijing dialect: "a sufficiently precise and strong language norm had not yet become a reality in China".

Historical use of Gwoyeu Romatzyh is reflected in the official spelling of the name for the province of Shaanxi, which distinguishes it from that of neighbouring Shanxi; these names differ only by tone, and their systematic pinyin romanizations would be identical without the use of diacritics. The Warring States period state of Wey is often spelled as such to distinguish it from the more prominent state of Wei, whose names are homophonous in Mandarin, but were likely distinct in Old Chinese. Several prominent Chinese people have used GR to transliterate their names, such as the mathematician Shiing-Shen Chern; however, neither Chao nor Lin did. Following the proclamation of the People's Republic of China in 1949, GR was practically unused on the mainland. In 1958, the Chinese government officially replaced it with Hanyu Pinyin, which had been developed by a team led by Zhou Youguang over the previous two years. Pinyin is now the predominant system and an international standard used by the United Nations, the Library of Congress, and the International Organization for Standardization, as well as by most students learning Standard Chinese. GR saw considerable use in Taiwan during the 20th century, alongside Hanyu Pinyin, the autochthonous Tongyong Pinyin, and the bopomofo syllabary. It was also used there as a pronunciation aid until the 1970s, as in the monolingual Guoyu Cidian dictionary. In 1986, the Taiwanese government officially replaced GR with the modified Mandarin Phonetic Symbols II system.

== Description ==
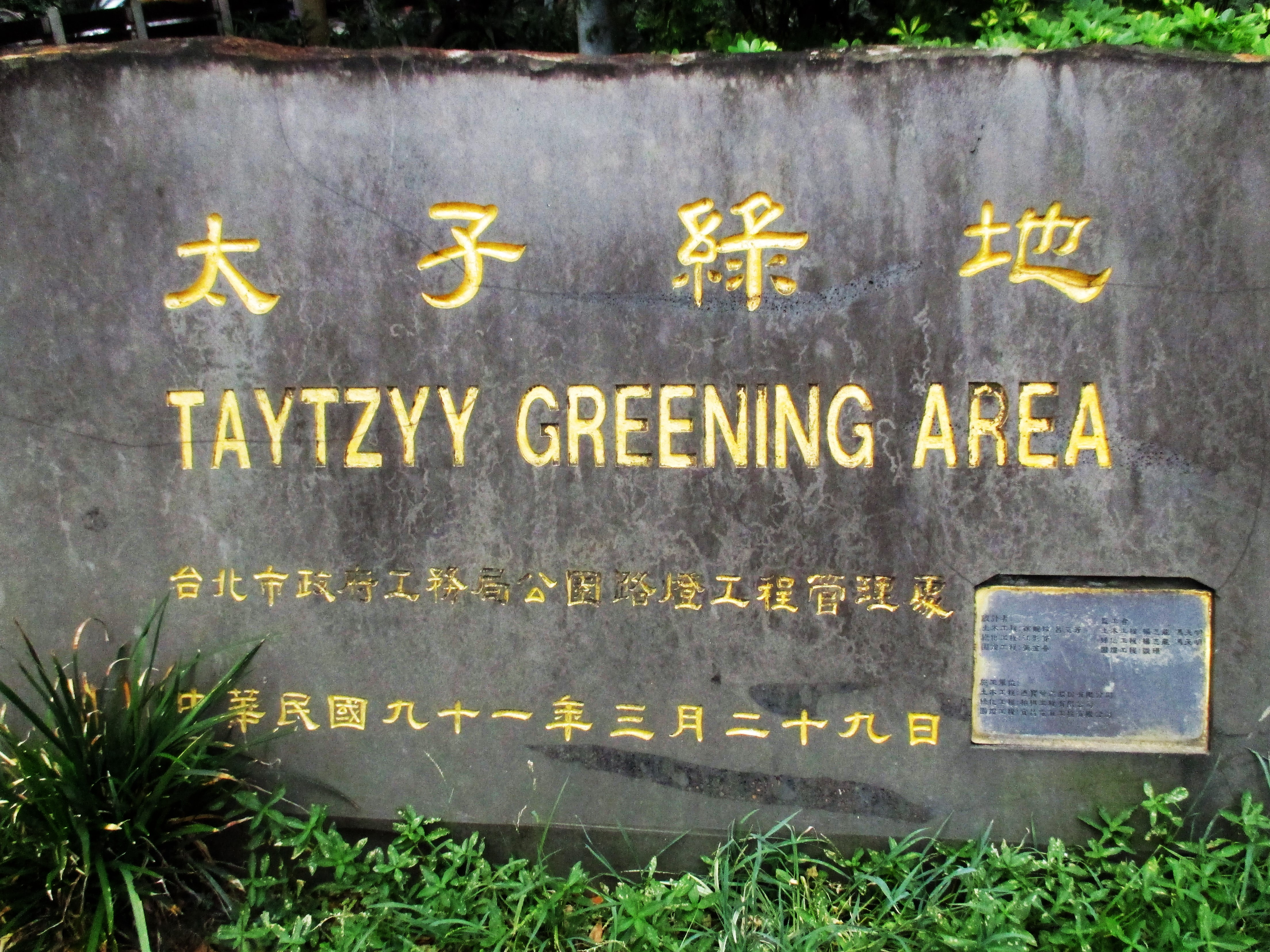
Gwoyeu Romatzyh on a park sign in Taipei – Taytzyy (太子; Tàizǐ)

=== Basic first tone forms ===
An important feature of Gwoyeu Romatzyh, inspired by its precursors and later adopted by pinyin, is the use of consonant pairs with a voicing distinction from Latin to instead represent the aspiration distinction present in Chinese. For example, ⟨b⟩ and ⟨p⟩ represent /p/ and /pʰ/, compared to ⟨p⟩ and ⟨p'⟩ in Wade–Giles. Another distinctive feature is Gwoyeu Romatzyh's use of ⟨j⟩, ⟨ch⟩, and ⟨sh⟩ to represent two different phonetic series. When followed by ⟨i⟩, these letters correspond to the alveolo-palatal series written in pinyin as ⟨j⟩, ⟨q⟩, and ⟨x⟩; otherwise, they correspond to the retroflex series written in pinyin as ⟨zh⟩, ⟨ch⟩, and ⟨sh⟩.

Other notable features of Gwoyeu Romatzyh orthography include:

- ⟨iu⟩ represents the close front rounded vowel /y/, which in pinyin is spelled either as ⟨ü⟩ or ⟨u⟩ depending on context
- Final ⟨-y⟩ represents the [ɨ] allophone
  Examples: GR ⟨shy⟩ and ⟨sy⟩ correspond to pinyin ⟨shi⟩ and ⟨si⟩ respectively.
- ⟨el⟩ corresponds to pinyin ⟨er⟩, with ⟨-r⟩ being reserved to indicate the second tone. The most important use of ⟨-el⟩ or ⟨-l⟩ is as a rhotacization suffix.
  Example: ⟨ideal⟩ ← ⟨i dean⟩ + ⟨-l⟩ for 一點兒 (yìdiǎnr; 'a little').
- A number of frequently occurring morphemes have abbreviated spellings in GR
  Examples: ⟨-g⟩ compared to pinyin ⟨-ge⟩, ⟨-j⟩ for ⟨-zhe⟩, ⟨-m⟩ for ⟨-me⟩, ⟨sh⟩ for ⟨shi⟩, and ⟨-tz⟩ for ⟨-zi⟩

=== Tonal spelling ===
By default, the basic Gwoyeu Romatzyh spelling described above is used for syllables with the first tone. The basic form is then modified to indicate tones 2, 3, and 4. This is accomplished in one of three ways, with the concise first method used whenever possible:

- either a letter is changed to another letter resembling it in sound, for example ⟨i⟩ to either ⟨y⟩ or ⟨e⟩
- or a letter is doubled
- or a silent ⟨r⟩ or ⟨h⟩ is added after the vowel

Syllables beginning with a sonorant—i.e. pinyin ⟨l-⟩, ⟨m-⟩, ⟨n-⟩, and ⟨r-⟩—are an exception: the basic form is then used for tone 2, and tone 1 is indicated by adding an ⟨h⟩ after the initial letter.

Examples of tonal spelling in Gwoyeu Romatzyh
	Tone 1	Tone 2	Tone 3	Tone 4
	貪 'corrupt'	彈 'pluck'	毯 'blanket'	炭 'charcoal'
GR	tan	tarn	taan	tann
Pinyin	tān	tán	tǎn	tàn
	优 'superior'	油 'oil'	有 'to have'	右 'rightward'
GR	iou	you	yeou	yow
Pinyin	yōu	yóu	yǒu	yòu
	輕 'gentle'	情 'sentiment'	請 'invite'	慶 'celebrate'
GR	ching	chyng	chiing	chinq
Pinyin	qīng	qíng	qǐng	qìng
	咪 'meow'	彌 'full'	米 'rice'	宓 'silent'
GR	mhi	mi	mii	mih
Pinyin	mī	mí	mǐ	mì

=== Word segmentation ===
An important principle of Gwoyeu Romatzyh is that text should use spaces as word dividers. The concept of a "word" as understood in Western linguistics has been adapted for Chinese comparatively recently. The basic unit of speech is popularly thought to be the syllable; in Chinese, each syllable almost always represents a morpheme—a language's basic unit of meaning—and written Chinese characters generally correspond with these morpheme–syllables. Characters are written without spaces between words. However, most words used in modern written vernacular Chinese are two-syllable compounds; Chao reflected this in GR's orthography by grouping syllables in words together without hyphenation, as in Wade–Giles (e.g. Pei^{3}-ching^{1}).

== Publication history ==
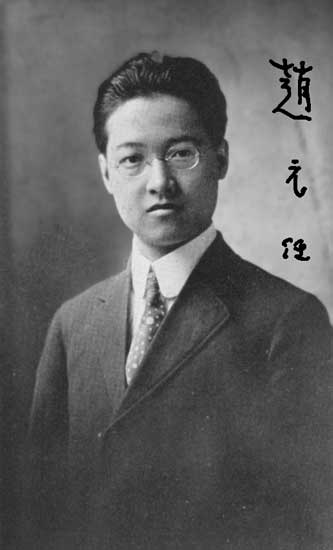
Yuen Ren Chao as a young man, c. 1916

Chao used Gwoyeu Romatzyh in four influential works:

- Concise Dictionary of Spoken Chinese (1947; in collaboration with Yang Lien-sheng)
- Mandarin Primer – originally used in the Army Specialized Training Program at the Harvard University School for Overseas Administration from 1943 to 1944, and subsequently in civilian courses; republished in 1948. It was written "to supply the advanced student of spoken Chinese with reading matter which he can actually use in his speech". The work consists of three volumes of Chinese text with facing GR romanization, including audio recordings of dialogue, fragments of an autobiography, two plays, and a translation of Lewis Carroll's Through the Looking-Glass.
- A Grammar of Spoken Chinese (1968)
- Readings in Sayable Chinese (1968) – in this context, sayable means colloquial, as opposed to the written vernacular Chinese often read by students.

In 1942, Walter Simon introduced Gwoyeu Romatzyh to English-speaking sinologists in a pamphlet entitled The New Official Chinese Latin Script. Over the remainder of the 1940s he published a series of textbooks and readers, as well as a Chinese-English dictionary using GR. His son Harry Simon later went on to use GR in papers he published on Chinese linguistics.

In 1960, Y. C. Liu, who was a colleague of Walter Simon at SOAS, published Fifty Chinese Stories, comprising selections from the Chinese classics. It was a parallel text featuring the original Literary Chinese as well as vernacular translation, in addition to GR and romanized Japanese transliterations prepared by Simon.

Lin Yutang's Chinese-English Dictionary of Modern Usage (1972) incorporated a number of novelties, which included a simplified romanization scheme derived from GR, though Lin eliminated most of the spelling rules.

The first three issues of Shin Tarng magazine (1982–1989; Xīntáng) also used a simplified version of Gwoyeu Romatzyh. The fourth issue, now rendered as Xin Talng, used a system that adapted pinyin to use tonal spelling akin to GR.

== Pedagogy ==
Chao believed that the benefit of tonal spelling was to make the use of tones in Chinese more salient to learners:

[GR] makes the spelling more complicated, but gives an individuality to the physiognomy of words, with which it is possible to associate meaning ... as an instrument of teaching, tonal spelling has proved in practice to be a most powerful aid in enabling the student to grasp the material with precision and clearness.

For example, it may be easier to memorize the difference between GR Beeijing 'Beijing' and beyjiing 'background' than the pinyin Běijīng and bèijǐng. One study conducted at the University of Oregon from 1991 to 1993 compared the results of teaching elementary level Chinese using either pinyin or GR to two matched groups of students; the study ultimately concluded that "GR did not lead to significantly greater accuracy in tonal production".
