= Mogao Caves =

Caves near Dunhuang City, Gansu, China

UNESCO World Heritage Site
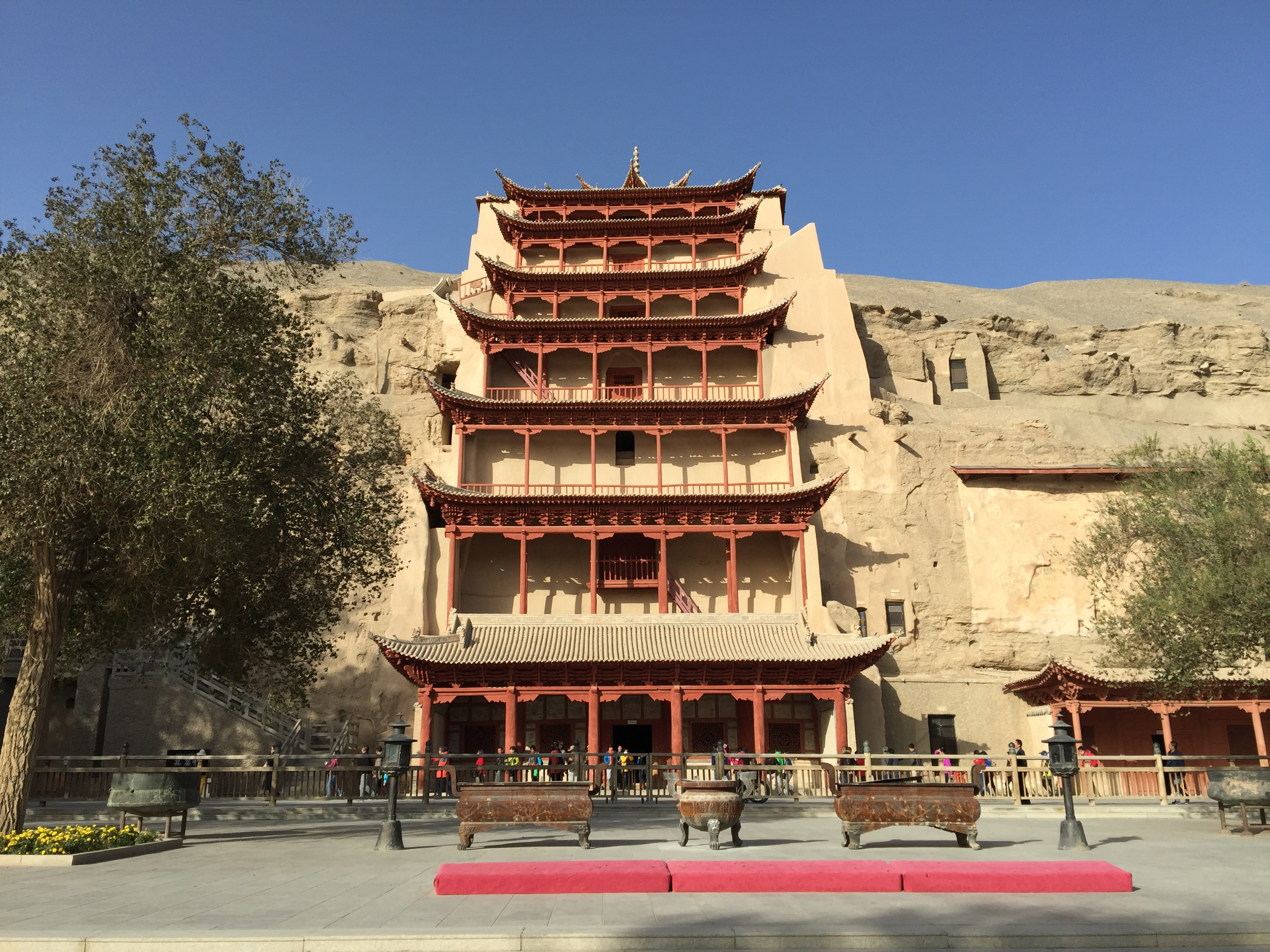
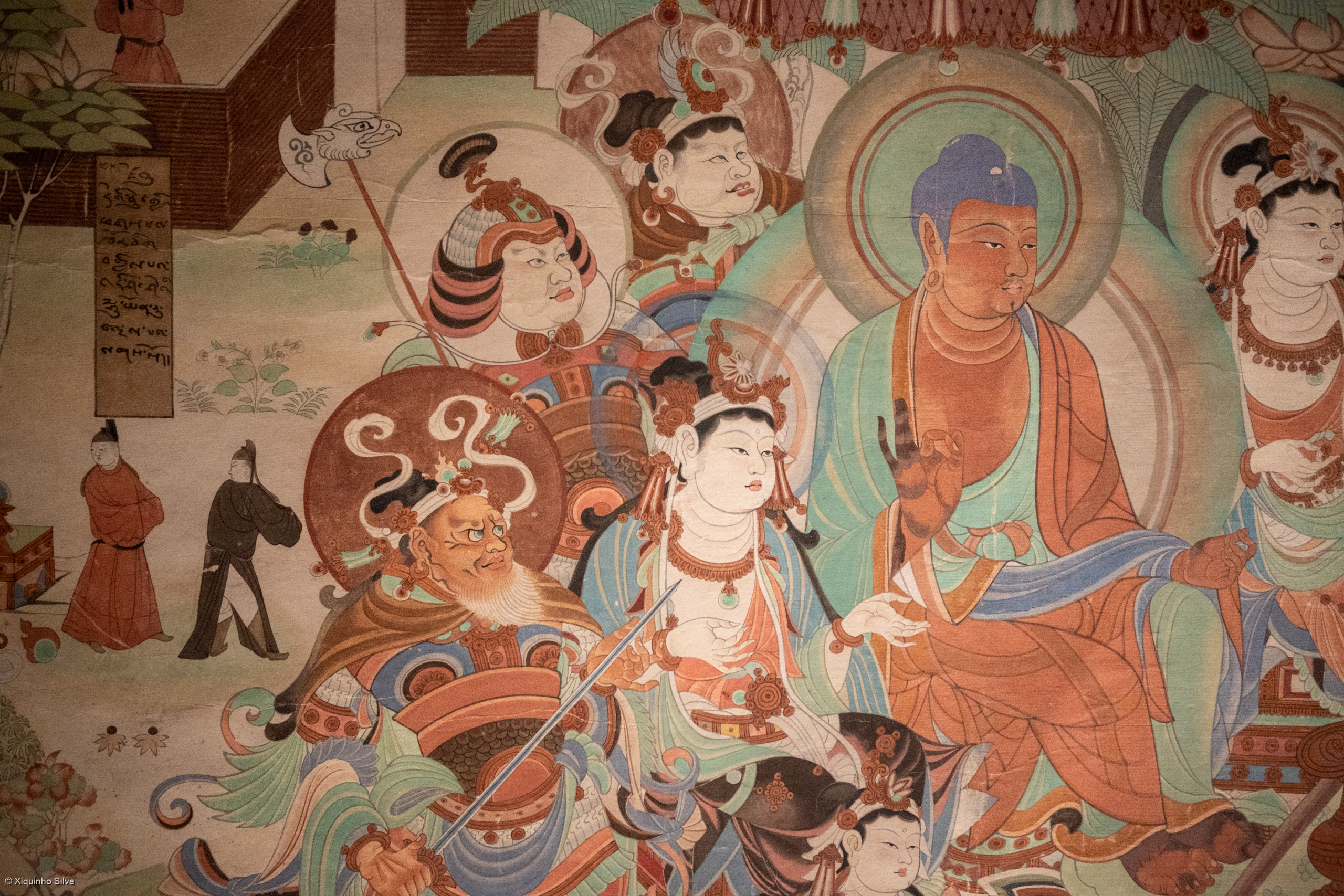
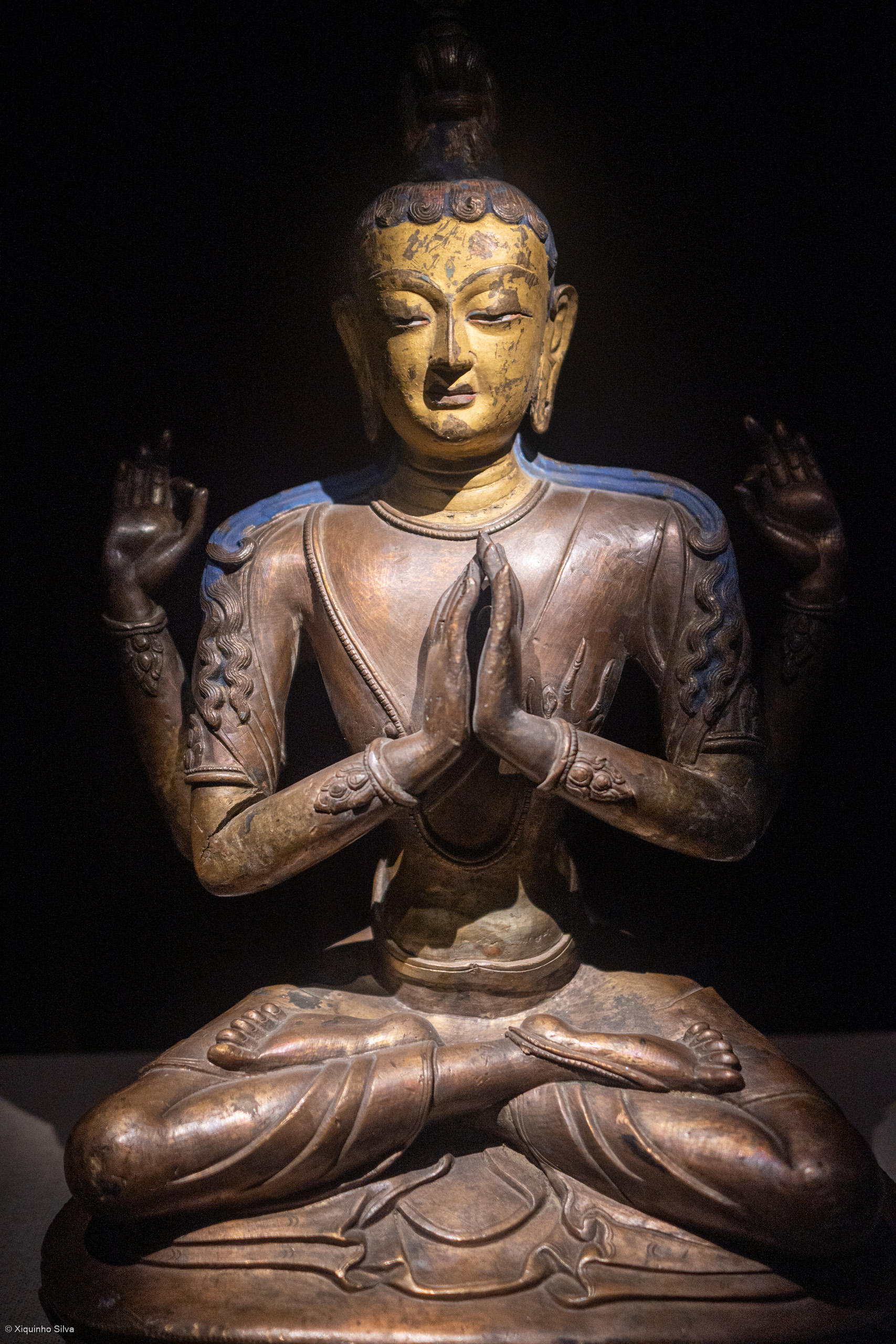
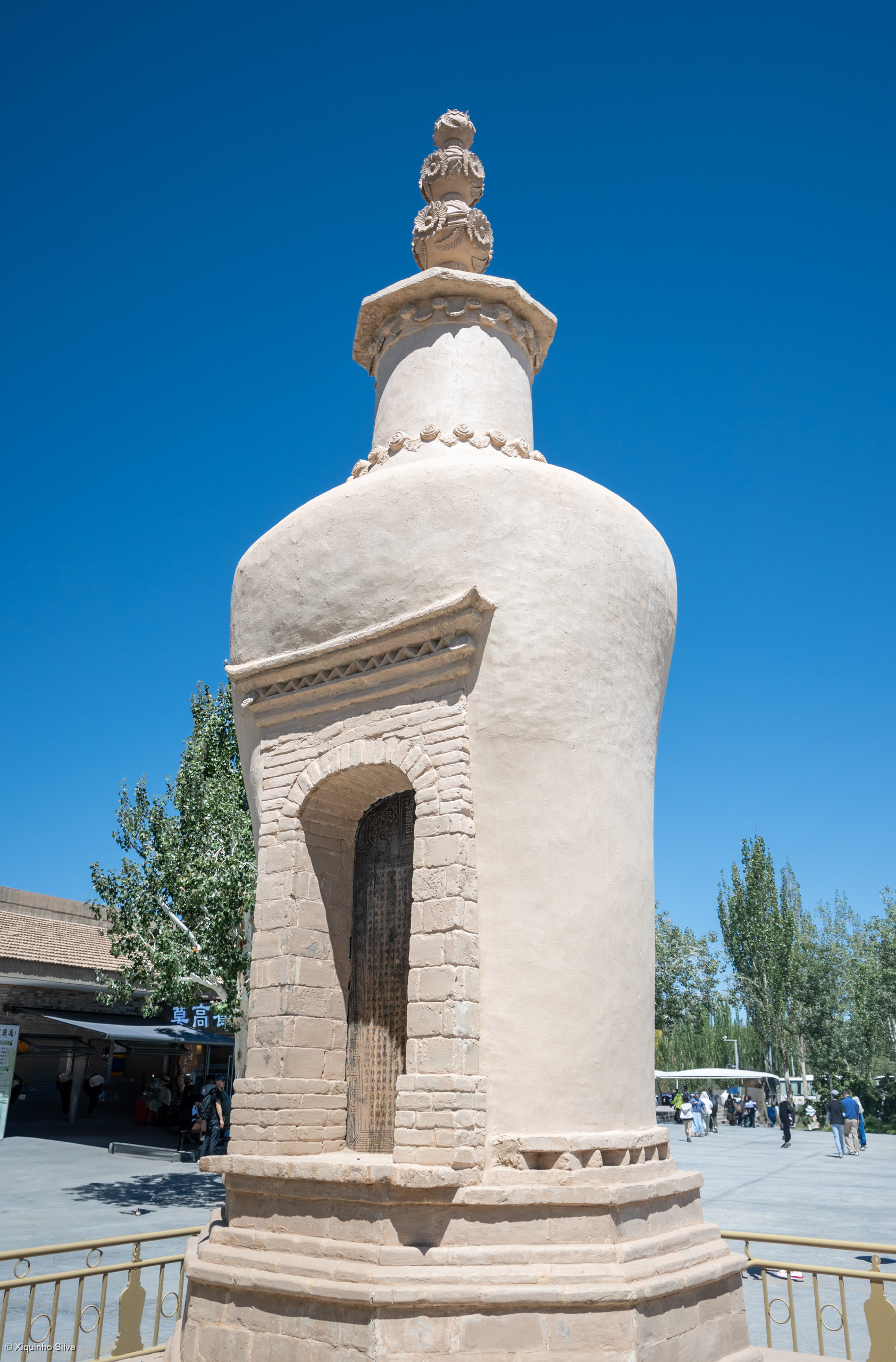
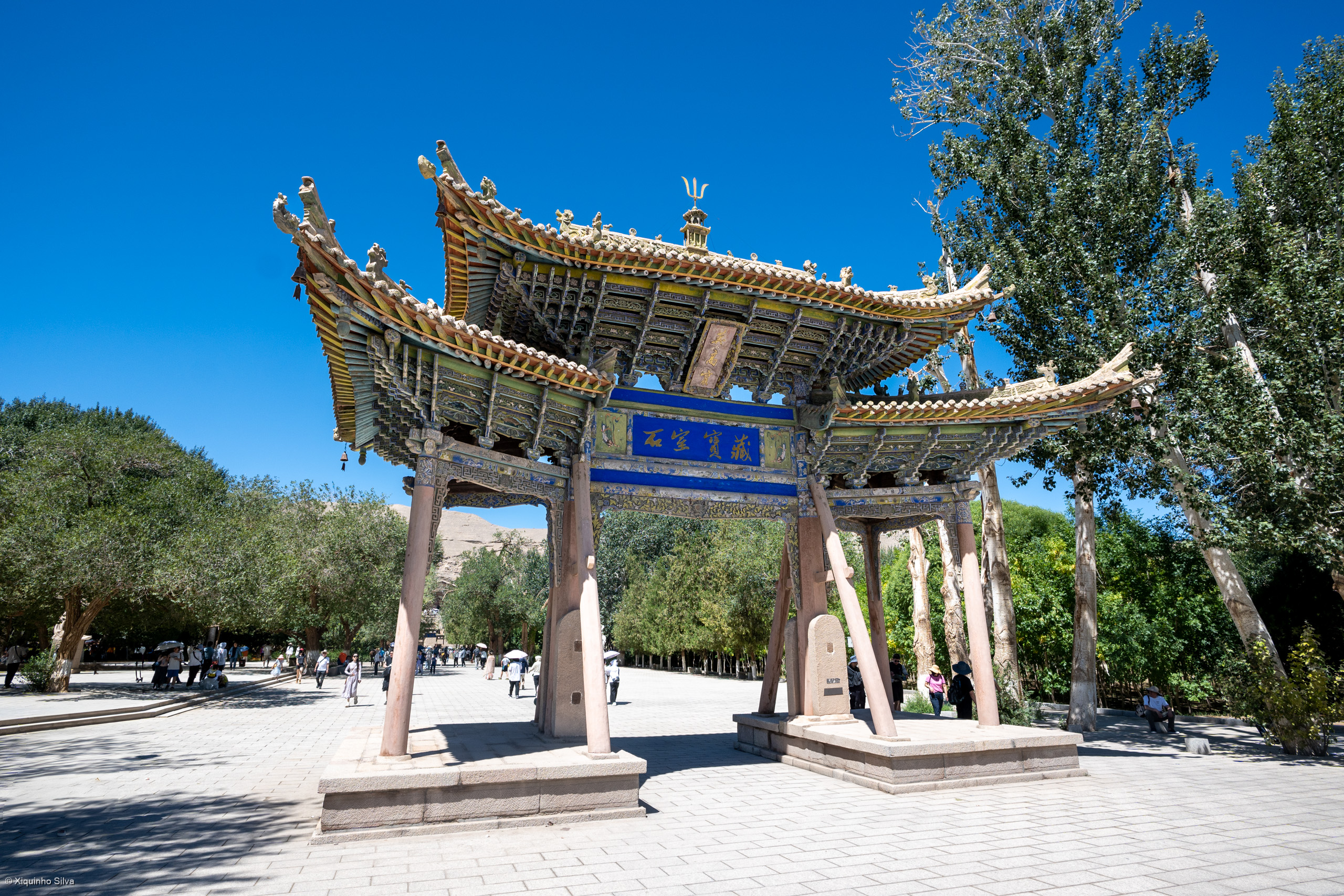

- Location within Gansu Location within China
- Location: Dunhuang, Gansu, China
- Criteria: i, ii, iii, iv, v, vi
- Reference: 440
- Inscription: 1987 (11th Session)
- Website: summerpalace-china.com
- Coordinates: 40°02′14″N 94°48′15″E

Mogao Caves
- "Mogao Caves" in Chinese characters
- Chinese: 莫高窟
Transcriptions
Standard Mandarin
- Hanyu Pinyin: Mògāo kū
- IPA: [mwô.káʊ kʰú]
Yue: Cantonese
- Yale Romanization: Mohk-gōu fāt
- Jyutping: Mok6-gou1 fat1
- IPA: [mɔk̚˨.kɔw˥ fɐt̚˥]
Southern Min
- Tâi-lô: Bo̍k-ko khut

The Mogao Caves, also known as the Thousand Buddha Grottoes or Caves of the Thousand Buddhas, form a system of 500 temples 25 km (16 mi) southeast of the center of Dunhuang, an oasis located at a religious and cultural crossroads on the Silk Road, in Gansu province, China. The caves may also be known as the Dunhuang Caves; however, this term is also used as a collective term to include other Buddhist cave sites in and around the Dunhuang area, such as the Western Thousand Buddha Caves, Eastern Thousand Buddha Caves, Yulin Caves, and Five Temple Caves. The caves contain some of the finest examples of Buddhist art spanning a period of 1,000 years.

The first caves were dug out in 366 CE as places of Buddhist meditation and worship; later the caves became a place of pilgrimage, and caves continued to be built at the site until the 14th century. The Mogao Caves are the best known of the Chinese Buddhist grottoes and, along with Longmen Grottoes and Yungang Grottoes, are one of the three famous ancient Buddhist sculptural sites of China.

An important cache of documents was discovered in 1900 in the so-called "Library Cave", which had been walled-up in the 11th century. The contents of the library were subsequently dispersed around the world, and the largest collections are now found in Beijing, London, Paris and Berlin, and the International Dunhuang Programme exists to coordinate and collect scholarly work on the Dunhuang manuscripts and other material. The caves themselves are now a popular tourist destination, but the number of visitors has been capped to help with the preservation of the caves.

== Etymology ==
The caves are commonly referred to in Chinese as the Caves of the Thousand Buddhas (Chinese: 千佛洞; pinyin: qiānfó dòng), a name that some scholars have speculated to have come from the legend of its founding, when a monk Yuezun had a vision of a thousand Buddhas at the site. This name, however, may have come from the large number of Buddha figures at the site, or the miniatures figures painted on the walls of these caves as these figures are called "thousand Buddhas" colloquially. The name Mogao Caves (Chinese: 莫高窟; pinyin: Mògāo kū) was used in the Tang dynasty, where 'Mogao' refers to an administrative district at the site during the Tang dynasty. Mogao may mean "peerless" (literally "none higher", where "mo" means "none", and "gao" means "high"); an alternative reading may be "high in the desert" if "mo" is read as a variant of the Chinese term for "desert". Mogao is also used as the name of a modern town that is administered by Dunhuang city: Mogao Town (莫高镇). The Mogao Caves are also often referred to as the Dunhuang Caves after the nearest city Dunhuang, which means "blazing beacon" as beacons were used at the frontier outpost to warn of attacks by nomadic tribes. The term Dunhuang Caves however is also used in a broader sense as a collective term for all the caves found in or around the Dunhuang area.

== History ==
Dunhuang was established as a frontier garrison outpost by the Han dynasty Emperor Wudi to protect against the Xiongnu in 111 BC. It also became an important gateway to the West, a centre of commerce along the Silk Road, as well as a meeting place of various people and religions such as Buddhism. The Mogao Caves near Dunhuang were first constructed in the 4th century AD and were used as a site of Buddhist worship and pilgrimage. The caves contain over 400,000 square feet of frescoes and sculptures, making them one of the largest repositories of Buddhist art in the world.

The construction of the Mogao Caves is generally taken to have begun sometime in the fourth century AD, when Dunhuang was under control of the Former Liang dynasty. According to a book written during the reign of Empress Wu Zetian, Fokan Ji (佛龕記, An Account of Buddhist Shrines) by Li Junxiu (李君修), a Buddhist monk named Le Zun (樂尊, which may also be pronounced Yuezun) had a vision of a thousand Buddhas bathed in golden light at the site in 366 AD, inspiring him to build a cave here. The story is also found in other sources, such as in inscriptions on a stele in cave 332; an earlier date of 353 however was given in another document, Shazhou Tujing (沙州土鏡, Geography of Shazhou). He was later joined by a second monk Faliang (法良), and the site gradually grew, by the time of the Northern Liang a small community of monks had formed at the site. The caves initially served only as a place of meditation for hermit monks, but developed to serve the monasteries that sprang up nearby.

The earliest decorated Mogao Caves remaining to this day (caves 268, 272 and 275), were built and decorated in the Northern Liang period between 419 and 439 CE, before the invasion of the Northern Wei. They share many stylistic characteristics in common with some of the Kizil Caves, such as Cave 17. Members of the ruling family of Northern Wei and Northern Zhou then constructed many caves here, and it flourished in the short-lived Sui dynasty. By the Tang dynasty, the number of caves had reached over a thousand.

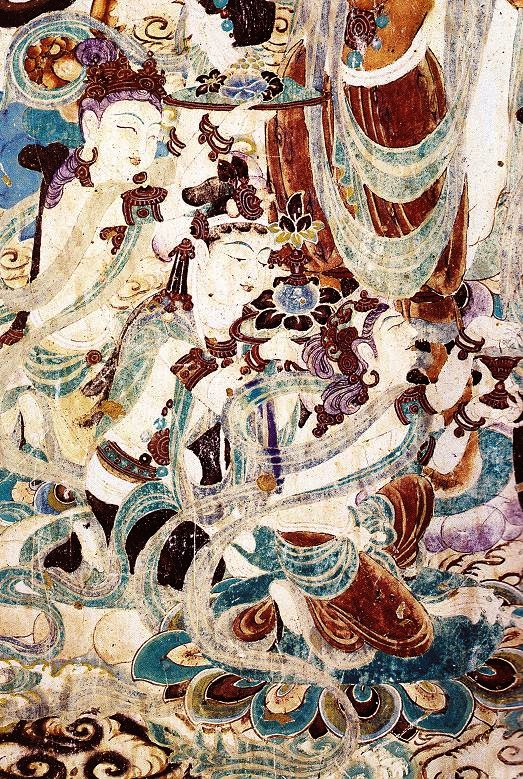
Details of painting of the meeting of Manjusri and Vimalakirti. Cave 159.

By the Sui and Tang dynasties, Mogao Caves had become a place of worship and pilgrimage for the public. From the 4th until the 14th century, caves were constructed by monks to serve as shrines with funds from donors. These caves were elaborately painted, the cave paintings and architecture serving as aids to meditation, as visual representations of the quest for enlightenment, as mnemonic devices, and as teaching tools to inform those illiterate about Buddhist beliefs and stories. The major caves were sponsored by patrons such as important clergy, local ruling elite, foreign dignitaries, as well as Chinese emperors. Other caves may have been funded by merchants, military officers, and other local people such as women's groups.

During the Tang dynasty, Dunhuang became the main hub of commerce of the Silk Road and a major religious centre. A large number of the caves were constructed at Mogao during this era, including the two large statues of Buddha at the site, the largest one constructed in 695 following an edict a year earlier by Empress Wu Zetian to build giant statues across the country. The site escaped the persecution of Buddhists ordered by Emperor Wuzong in 845 as it was then under Tibetan control. During this time of Tibetan domination (787–848), Dunhuang was not only occupied but also became part of a huge administrative system that was based on the Tibetan Empire. The region was ruled by a system called "khrom," which merged Tibetan political power with Han administrative methods. Tibetan officials and local Han elites made up the ruling body. As a frontier town, Dunhuang had been occupied at various times by other non-Han Chinese people. After the Tang dynasty, the site went into a gradual decline, and construction of new caves ceased entirely after the Yuan dynasty. By then Islam had conquered much of Central Asia, and the Silk Road declined in importance when trading via sea-routes began to dominate Chinese trade with the outside world. During the Ming dynasty, the Silk Road was finally officially abandoned, and Dunhuang slowly became depopulated and largely forgotten by the outside world. Most of the Mogao caves were abandoned; the site, however, was still a place of pilgrimage and was used as a place of worship by local people at the beginning of the twentieth century when there was renewed interest in the site.

=== Discovery and revival ===
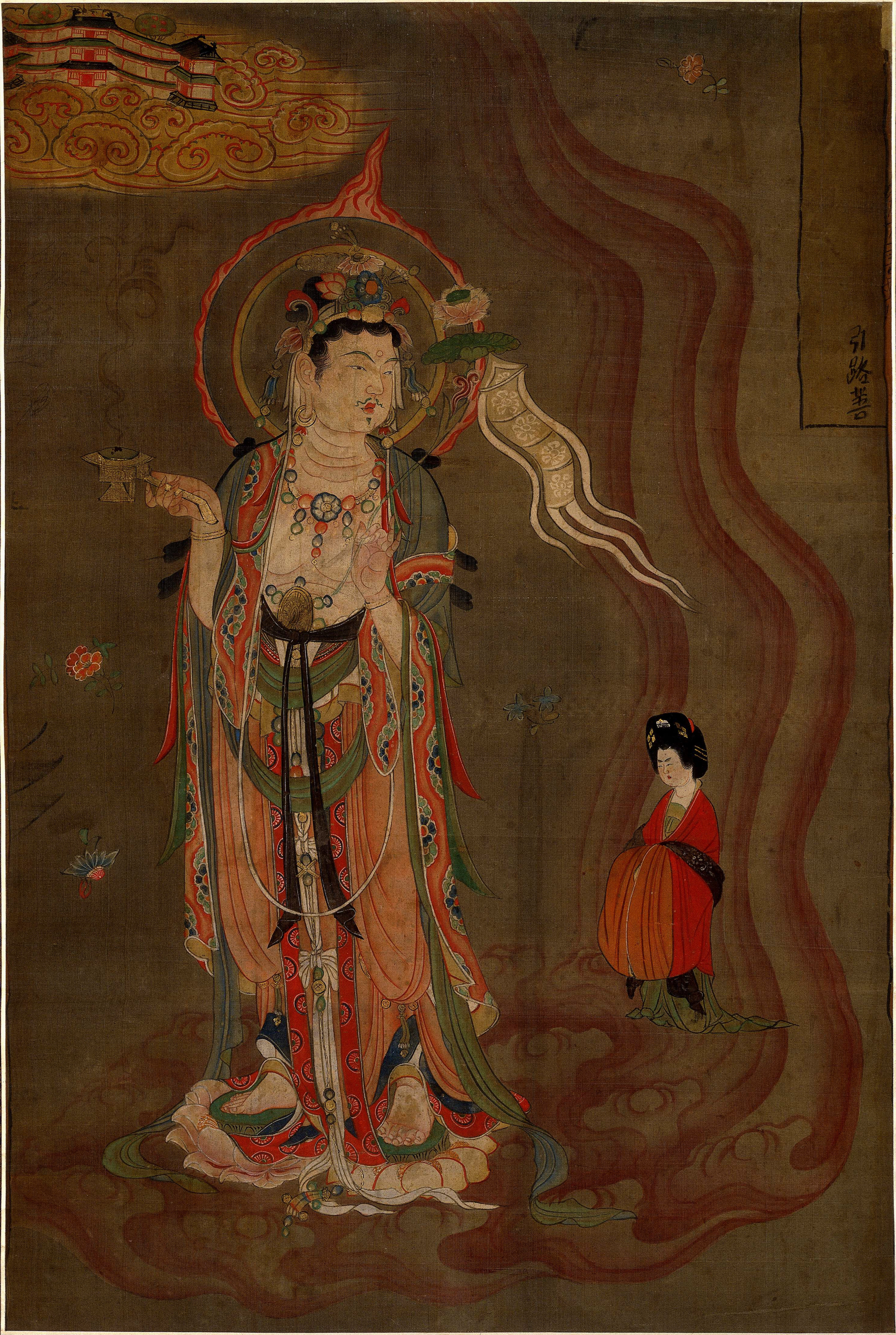
Bodhisattva leading a lady donor towards the Pure Lands. Painting on silk (Library Cave), Late Tang.

During late nineteenth century and early twentieth century, Western explorers began to show interest in the ancient Silk Road and the lost cities of Central Asia, and those who passed through Dunhuang noted the murals, sculptures, and artifacts such as the Stele of Sulaiman at Mogao. There is an estimated half a million square feet of religious wall murals within the caves. The biggest discovery, however, came from a Chinese Taoist abbot named Wang Yuanlu who had appointed himself guardian of some of these temples around the turn of the century and tried to raise funds to repair the statues.

Some of the caves had by then been blocked by sand, and Wang set about clearing away the sand and made an attempt at restoration of the site. In one such cave, on 25 June 1900, Wang followed the drift of smoke from a cigarette, and discovered a walled up area behind one side of a corridor leading to a main cave. Behind the wall was a small cave stuffed with an enormous hoard of manuscripts. In the next few years, Wang took some manuscripts to show to various officials who expressed varying level of interest, but in 1904 Wang re-sealed the cave following an order by the governor of Gansu concerned about the cost of transporting these documents.

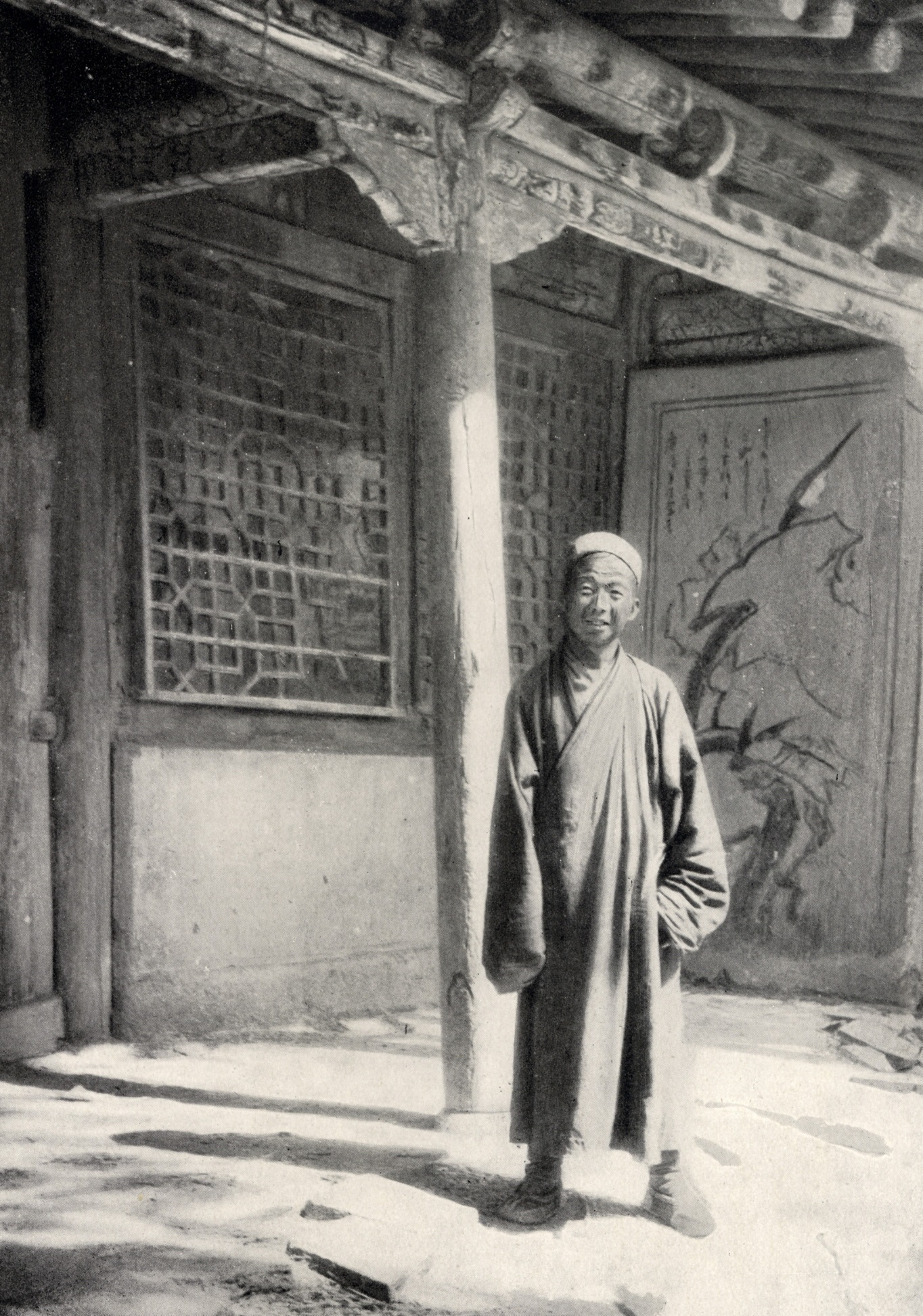
Abbot Wang Yuanlu, discoverer of the hidden Library Cave

Words of Wang's discovery drew the attention of a joint British/Indian group led by the Hungarian-born British archaeologist Aurel Stein who was on an archaeological expedition in the area in 1907. Stein negotiated with Wang to allow him to remove a significant number of manuscripts as well as the finest paintings and textiles in exchange for a donation to Wang's restoration effort. He was followed by a French expedition under Paul Pelliot who acquired many thousands of items in 1908, and then by a Japanese expedition under Otani Kozui in 1911 and a Russian expedition under Sergei F. Oldenburg in 1914. A well-known scholar Luo Zhenyu edited some of the manuscripts Pelliot acquired into a volume which was then published in 1909 as "Manuscripts of the Dunhuang Caves" (敦煌石室遺書).

Stein and Pelliot provoked much interest in the West about the Dunhuang Caves. Scholars in Beijing, after seeing samples of the documents in Pelliot's possession, became aware of their value. Concerned that the remaining manuscripts might be lost, Luo Zhenyu and others persuaded the Ministry of Education to recover the rest of the manuscripts to be sent to Peking (Beijing) in 1910. However, not all the remaining manuscripts were taken to Peking, and of those retrieved, some were then stolen. Rumours of caches of documents taken by local people continued for some time, and a cache of documents hidden by Wang from the authorities was later found in the 1940s. Some of the caves were damaged and vandalized by White Russian soldiers when they were used by the local authority in 1921 to house Russian soldiers fleeing the civil war following the Russian Revolution. In 1924, American explorer Langdon Warner removed a number of murals as well as a statue from some of the caves. In 1939 Kuomintang soldiers stationed at Dunhuang caused some damage to the murals and statues at the site.

The situation improved in 1941 when, following a visit by Wu Zuoren to the site the previous year, the painter Zhang Daqian arrived at the caves with a small team of assistants and stayed for two and a half years to repair and copy the murals. He exhibited and published the copies of the murals in 1943, which helped to publicize and give much prominence to the art of Dunhuang within China. Historian Xiang Da then persuaded Yu Youren, a prominent member of the Kuomintang (Chinese Nationalist Party), to set up an institution, the Research Institute of Dunhuang Art (which later became the Dunhuang Academy), at Mogao in 1944 to look after the site and its contents. In 1956, the first Premier of the People's Republic of China, Zhou Enlai, took a personal interest in the caves and sanctioned a grant to repair and protect the site; and in 1961, the Mogao Caves were declared to be a specially protected historical monument by the State Council, and large-scale renovation work at Mogao began soon afterwards. The site escaped the widespread damage caused to many religious sites during the Cultural Revolution.

Today, efforts are continuing to conserve and research the site and its content. The Mogao Caves became one of the UNESCO World Heritage Sites in 1987. From 1988 to 1995 a further 248 caves were discovered to the north of the 487 caves known since the early 1900s.

The Dunhuang Academy entered a period of "scientific conservation" for the Mogao Caves in the 1980s and began exploring "digital conservation" as early as 1993. Since 2010, it has completed photographic acquisition of 120 caves, image processing of 40 caves, panoramic roaming of 120 caves, and 3D reconstruction of 20 painted sculptures in the Mogao Caves. The Dunhuang Academy also introduced I-m-Cave, a multi-touch desktop system for virtual tours of the Mogao Caves, which presents a relationship between currently damaged artifacts and their virtual restored versions that cannot be experienced during a real tour.

== The Library Cave ==
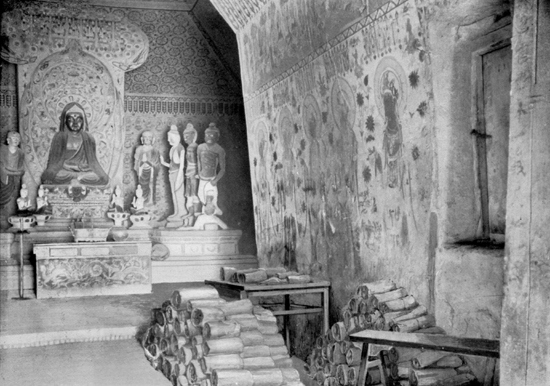
Picture of Cave 16, by Aurel Stein in 1907, with manuscripts piled up beside the entrance to Cave 17, the Library Cave, which is to the right in this picture.

Cave 17, discovered by Wang Yuanlu in the early 1900s, came to be known as the Library Cave. It is located off the entrance leading to cave 16 and was originally used as a memorial cave for a local monk Hongbian on his death in 862. Hongbian, from a wealthy Wu family, was responsible for the construction of cave 16, and the Library Cave may have been used as his retreat in his lifetime. The cave originally contained his statue which was moved to another cave when it was used to keep manuscripts, some of which bear Hongbian's seal. A large number of documents dating from 406 to 1002 were found in the cave, heaped up in closely packed layers of bundles of scrolls. In addition to the 1,100 bundles of scrolls, there were also over 15,000 paper books and shorter texts, including a Hebrew penitential prayer (selichah) (see Dunhuang manuscripts). An estimated 50,000 ancient documents were discovered inside, on topics ranging from literature to philosophy, art and medicine. The Library Cave also contained textiles such as banners, numerous damaged figurines of Buddhas, and other Buddhist paraphernalia. According to Stein who was the first to describe the cave in its original state:

Heaped up in layers, but without any order, there appeared in the dim light of the priest's little lamp a solid mass of manuscript bundles rising to a height of nearly ten feet, and filling, as subsequent measurement showed, close on 500 cubic feet. The area left clear within the room was just sufficient for two people to stand in.

— Aurel Stein, Ruins of Desert Cathay: Vol. II

The Library Cave was walled off sometime early in the 11th century. A number of theories have been proposed as the reason for sealing the caves. Stein first proposed that the cave had become a waste repository for venerable, damaged and used manuscripts and hallowed paraphernalia and then sealed perhaps when the place came under threat. Following this interpretation some suggested that the handwritten manuscripts of the Tripitaka became obsolete when printing became widespread, the older manuscripts were therefore stored away. Another suggestion is that the cave was simply used as a book storehouse for documents which accumulated over a century and a half, then sealed up when it became full. Others, such as Pelliot, suggested an alternative scenario, that the monks hurriedly hid the documents in advance of an attack by invaders, perhaps when Xi Xia invaded in 1035. This theory was proposed in light of the absence of documents from Xi Xia and the disordered state in which Pelliot found the room (perhaps a misinterpretation because unbeknownst to him the room was disturbed by Stein months before). Another theory posits that the items were from a monastic library and hidden due to threats from Muslims who were moving eastward. This theory proposes that the monks of a nearby monastery heard about the fall of the Buddhist kingdom of Khotan to Karakhanids invaders from Kashgar in 1006 and the destruction it caused, so they sealed their library to avoid it being destroyed. Another possible theory posits that to save the manuscripts from a coming "Age of Decline", the Library Cave was sealed to prevent this from occurring.

The date of the sealing of the cave continued to be debated. Rong (2000) provided evidence to support 1002 as the date for sealing the cave, while Huntington (1986) supported a closing around the early- to mid-thirteenth century. It is difficult to determine the state of the materials found since the chamber was not opened "under scientific conditions", so critical evidence to support dating the closure was lost. The latest date recorded in the documents found in the cave is believed to be 1002, and although some have proposed later dates for some of the documents, the cave was likely to have been sealed not long after that date.

=== Dunhuang manuscripts ===
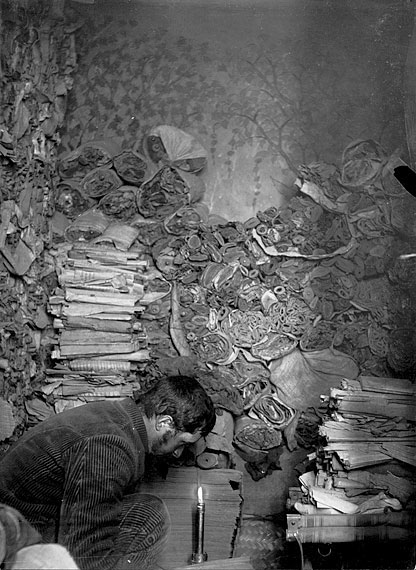
Paul Pelliot examining manuscripts in the Library Cave, 1908

The manuscripts from the Library Cave date from fifth century until early eleventh century when it was sealed. Up to 50,000 manuscripts may have been kept there, one of the greatest treasure troves of ancient documents found. While most of them are in Chinese, a large number of documents are in various other languages such as Tibetan, Uighur, Sanskrit, Avestan, and Sogdian, including the then little-known Khotanese. They may be old hemp paper scrolls in Chinese and many other languages, Tibetan pothis, and paintings on hemp, silk or paper. The subject matter of the great majority of the scrolls is Buddhist in nature, but it also covers a diverse material. Along with the expected Buddhist canonical works are original commentaries, apocryphal works, workbooks, books of prayers, Confucian works, Taoist works, Christian works, works from the Chinese government, administrative documents, anthologies, glossaries, dictionaries, and calligraphic exercises.

Many of the manuscripts were previously unknown or thought lost, and the manuscripts provide a unique insight into the religious and secular matters of Northern China as well as other Central Asian kingdoms from the early periods up to the Tang and early Song dynasty. The manuscripts found in the Library Cave include the earliest dated printed book, the Diamond Sutra from 868, which was first translated from Sanskrit into Chinese in the fourth century. These scrolls also include manuscripts that ranged from the Christian Jingjiao Documents to the Dunhuang Go Manual and ancient music scores, as well as the image of the Chinese astronomy Dunhuang map. These scrolls chronicle the development of Buddhism in China, record the political and cultural life of the time, and provide documentation of mundane secular matters that gives a rare glimpse into the lives of ordinary people of these eras.

The manuscripts were dispersed all over the world in the aftermath of the discovery. Stein's acquisition was split between Britain and India because his expedition was funded by both countries. Stein had the first pick and he was able to collect around 7,000 complete manuscripts and 6,000 fragments for which he paid £130, although these include many duplicate copies of the Diamond and Lotus Sutras. Pelliot took almost 10,000 documents for the equivalent of £90, but, unlike Stein, Pelliot was a trained sinologist literate in Chinese, and he was allowed to examine the manuscripts freely, so he was able to pick a better selection of documents than Stein. Pelliot was interested in the more unusual and exotic of the Dunhuang manuscripts, such as those dealing with the administration and financing of the monastery and associated lay men's groups. Many of these manuscripts survived only because they formed a type of palimpsest whereby papers were reused and Buddhist texts were written on the opposite side of the paper. Hundreds more of the manuscripts were sold by Wang to Otani Kozui and Sergei Oldenburg. Efforts are now underway to reconstitute the Library Cave manuscripts digitally, and they are now available as part of International Dunhuang Programme.

In the B53 cave of the northern Mogao Grottoes, a two page four fold Syrian manuscript was discovered, which was identified by Professor Duan Qing of Peking University as part of the Bible's Psalms, with annotations in Uyghur script interspersed between the lines. This is the first time that a Syrian version of the "Psalms" has been discovered in a Buddhist cave in China, providing unprecedented textual evidence for studying the spread of the Eastern Christian sect of Nestorianism in Dunhuang during the Mongol Yuan period.

== Art ==
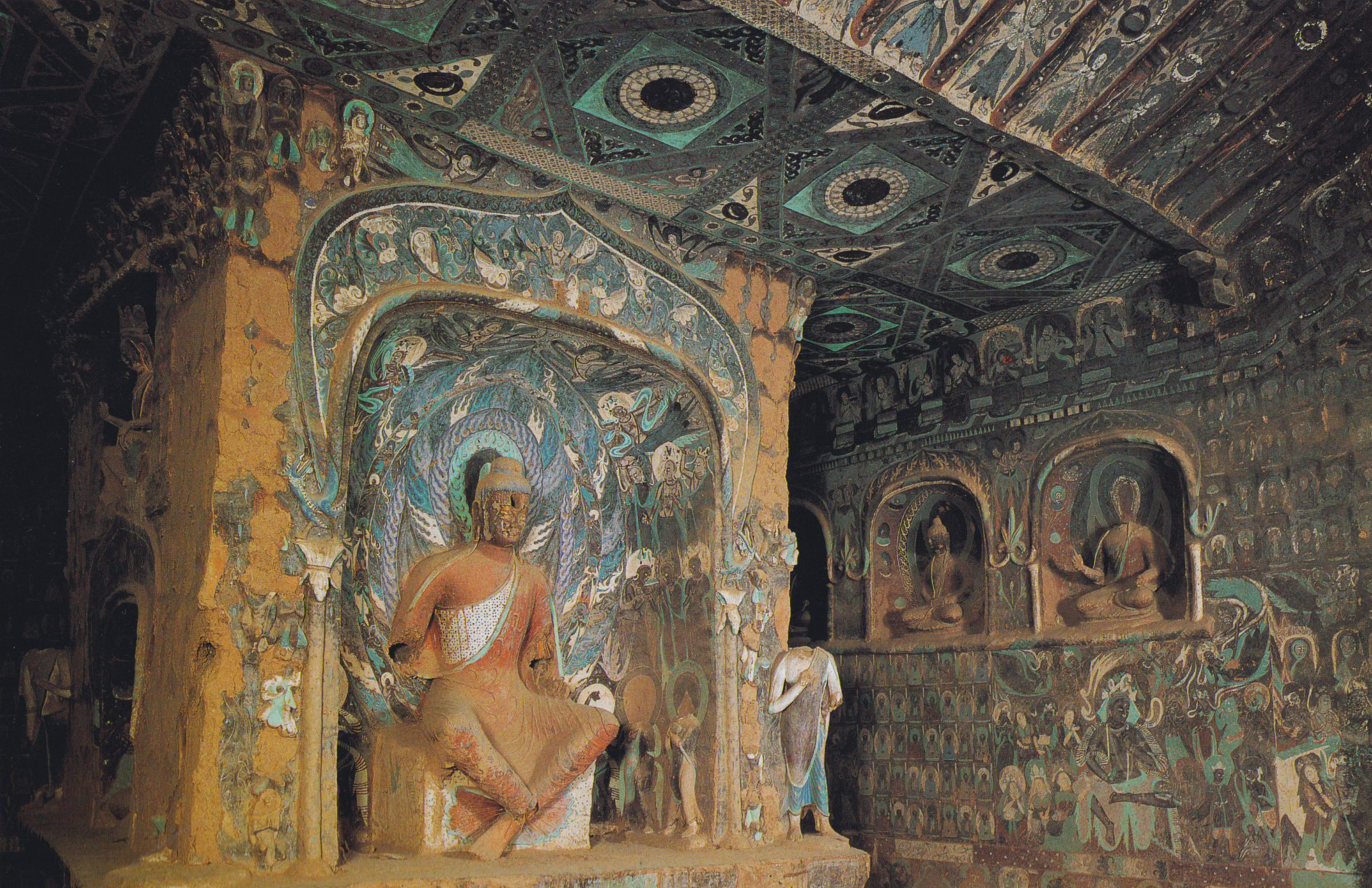
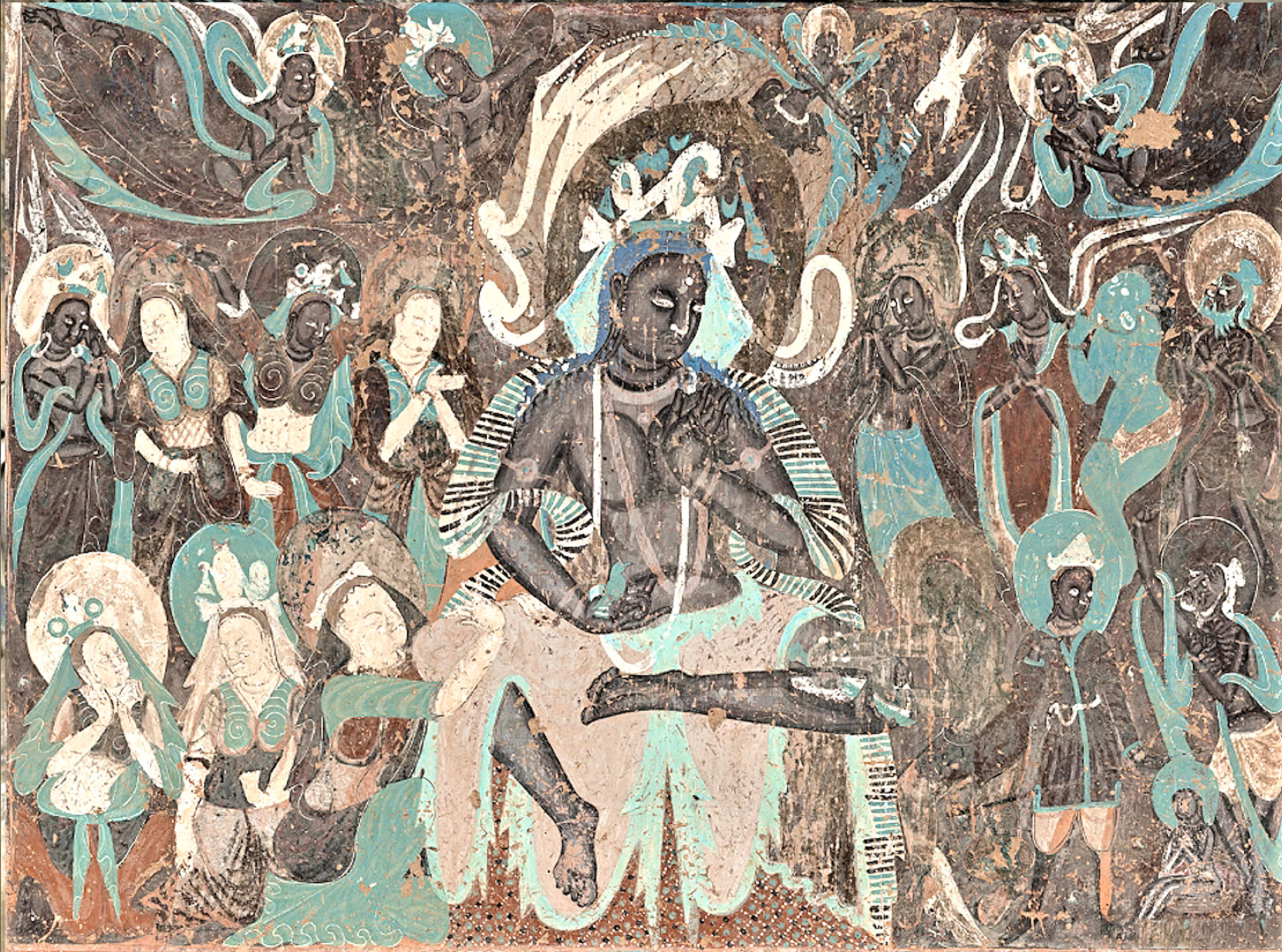
Sculpture and murals from Mogao cave nb. 254, built during the Northern Wei period between 475 and 490 CE. It is one of the earliest caves in Dunhuang, and shows parallels with the Kizil Caves, Western Indic features and Western influences. The panel represents the Shibi Jataka.

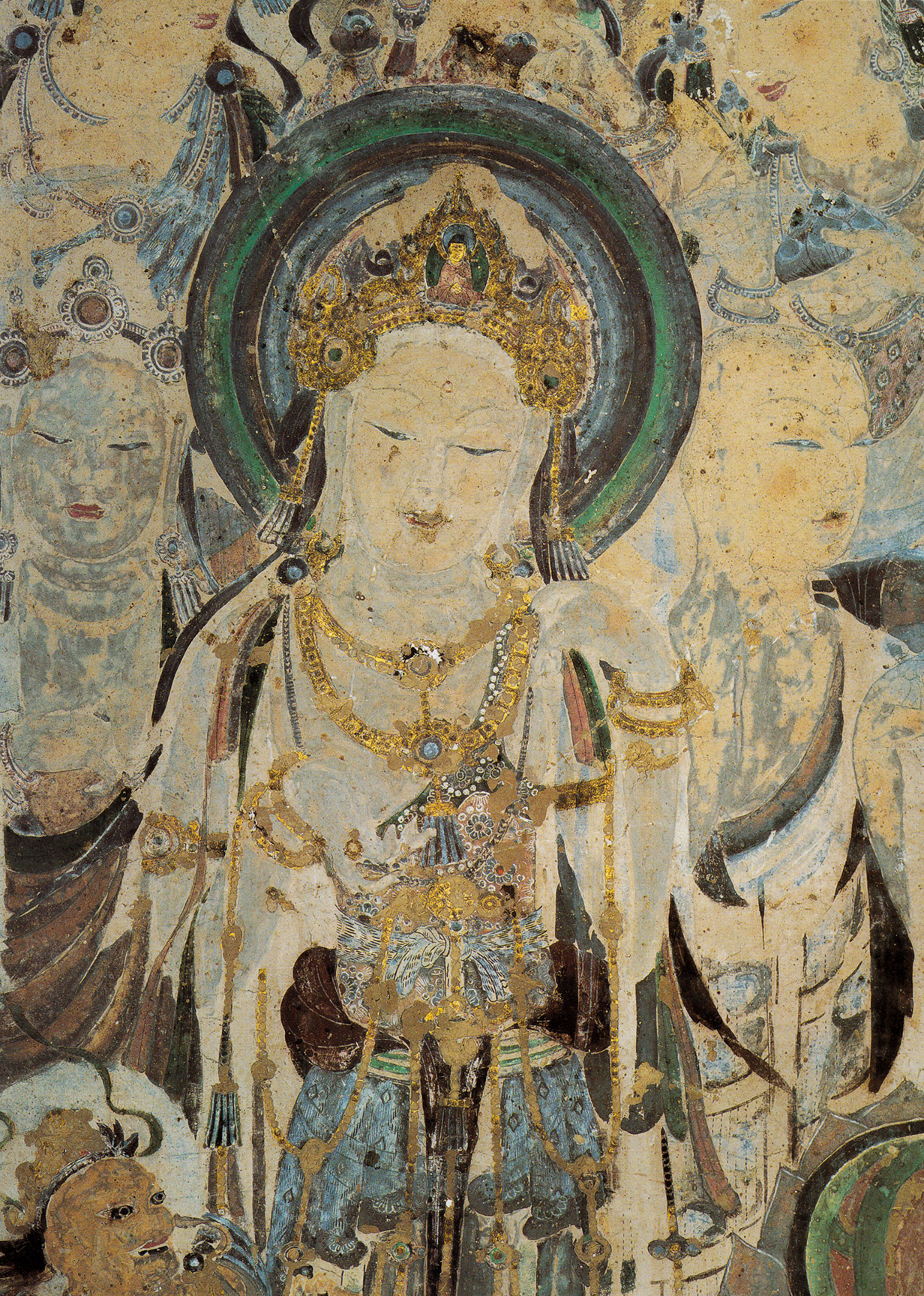
Mural of Avalokiteśvara (Guanyin), Worshipping Bodhisattvas and Mendicant in cave 57. Figures originally adorned with gold leaf. Early Tang.

The art of Dunhuang covers more than ten major genres, such as architecture, stucco sculpture, wall paintings, silk paintings, calligraphy, woodblock printing, embroidery, literature, music and dance, and popular entertainment.

=== Architecture ===
The caves are examples of rock-cut architecture, but unlike Longmen Grottoes and Yungang Grottoes, the local rock is a rather soft gravel conglomerate that is not suitable for either sculpture or elaborate architectural details. Many of the early caves were developed from earlier Buddhist rock-cut chaitya styles seen in places such as the Ajanta Caves in India, with a square-sectioned central column, with sculpture in niches, representing the stupa round which worshippers may circumambulate (parikrama) and gain blessings. Others are hall caves influenced by traditional Chinese and Buddhist temple architecture. These caves may have a truncated pyramidal ceiling sometimes painted to resemble a tent, or they may have a flat or gabled ceiling that imitates traditional buildings. Some of the caves used for meditation are adaptations of the Indian vihara (monastery) cave plan and contain side-chambers just large enough for one person to sit in.

Many of the caves originally had wooden porches or fore-temples built out from the cliff, but most of these have decayed or been lost in other ways, with only five remaining, the two earliest of which are rare surviving examples of Song dynasty wooden architecture. The most prominent wooden building at the site, first built during the Tang dynasty, houses the Great Buddha and was originally four storeys high, but it has been repaired at least five times and is no longer the original structure. A storey was added between 874 and 885, then repaired in the Guiyijun period, and two further storeys were added during a restoration in 1898. Two further restorations were carried out in the 20th century, and the building is now a 9-storey structure.

=== Murals ===
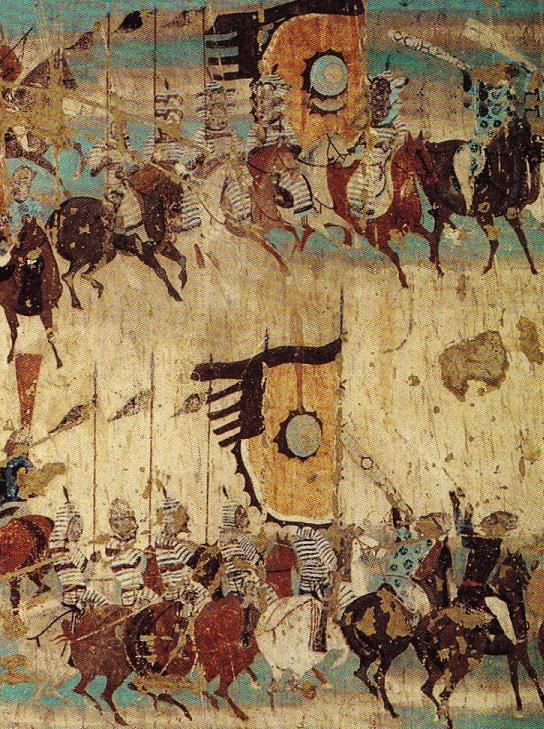
Detail of mural commemorating the victory of General Zhang Yichao over the Tibetan Empire. Cave 156, Late Tang dynasty.

The murals in the caves date from a period of over a thousand years, from the 5th to the 14th century, and many earlier ones were repainted at later points within the period. The murals are extensive, covering an area of 490,000 square feet (46,000 square metres). The most fully painted caves have paintings all over the walls and ceilings, with geometrical or plant decoration filling the spaces not taken by figurative images, which are above all of the Buddha. Sculpture is also brightly painted. The murals are valued for the scale and richness of content as well as their artistry. Buddhist subjects are most common, however some have traditional mythical subjects and portraits of patrons. These murals document the changing styles of Buddhist art in China for nearly a thousand years. The artistry of the murals reached its apogee during the Tang period, and the quality of the work dropped after the tenth century.

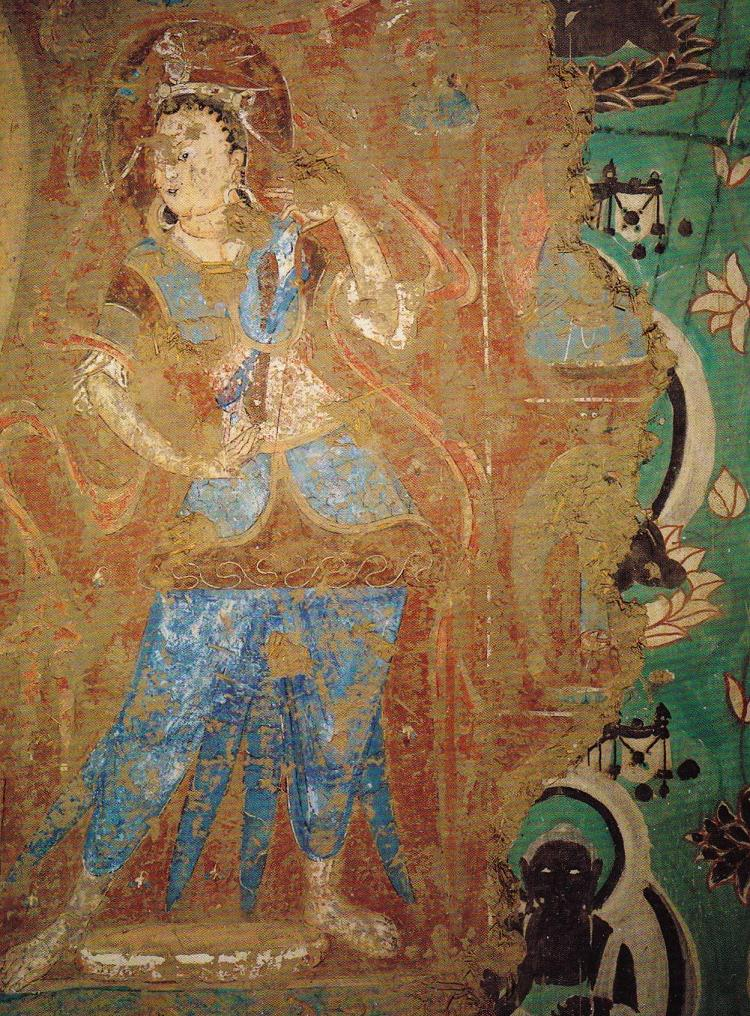
Early mural revealed after later over-painting had been partly removed. The flesh tones of the figure with its pigments protected from oxidation contrast with the darkened tone of buddhas in later painting seen on the right. Cave 253, Northern Wei.

Early murals showed a strong Indian and Central Asian influence in the painting techniques used, the composition and style of the paintings as well as costumes worn by the figures, but a distinct Dunhuang style began to emerge during the Northern Wei dynasty. Motifs of Chinese, Central Asian and Indian origin may be found in a single cave, and Chinese elements increased during the Western Wei period.

A common motif in many caves is the areas entirely covered by rows of small seated Buddha figures, after which this and other "Thousand Buddhas Caves" are named. These small Buddhas were drawn using stencils so that identical figures may be replicated. Flying apsaras, or celestial beings may be depicted in the ceiling or above the Buddhas, and figures of donors may be shown along the bottom of the walls. The paintings often depict jataka tales which are stories of the life of Buddha, or avadana which are parables of the doctrine of karma. The murals may also depict religious themes.

Bodhisattvas started appearing during the Northern Zhou period, with Avalokitesvara (Guanyin), which was originally male but acquired female characteristics later, the most popular. Most caves show Mahayana and Sravakayana (Theravada or Hinayana) influences, although Mahayana Buddhism became the dominant form during the Sui dynasty. An innovation of the Sui-Tang period is the visual representation of the sutra – Mahayana Buddhist teachings transformed into large complete and detailed narrative paintings. One of the central features of Tang art in Mogao is the representation of the paradise of the Pure Land, indicating the increasing popularity of this school of Mahayana Buddhism in the Tang era. The Western Paradise Illustration of Cave 220 is a well-preserved mural of this type. The iconography of Tantric Buddhism, such as the eleven-headed or thousand-armed Avalokitesvara, also started to appear in Mogao wall paintings during the Tang period. It became popular during the Tibetan occupation of Dunhuang and the subsequent periods, especially during the Yuan dynasty.

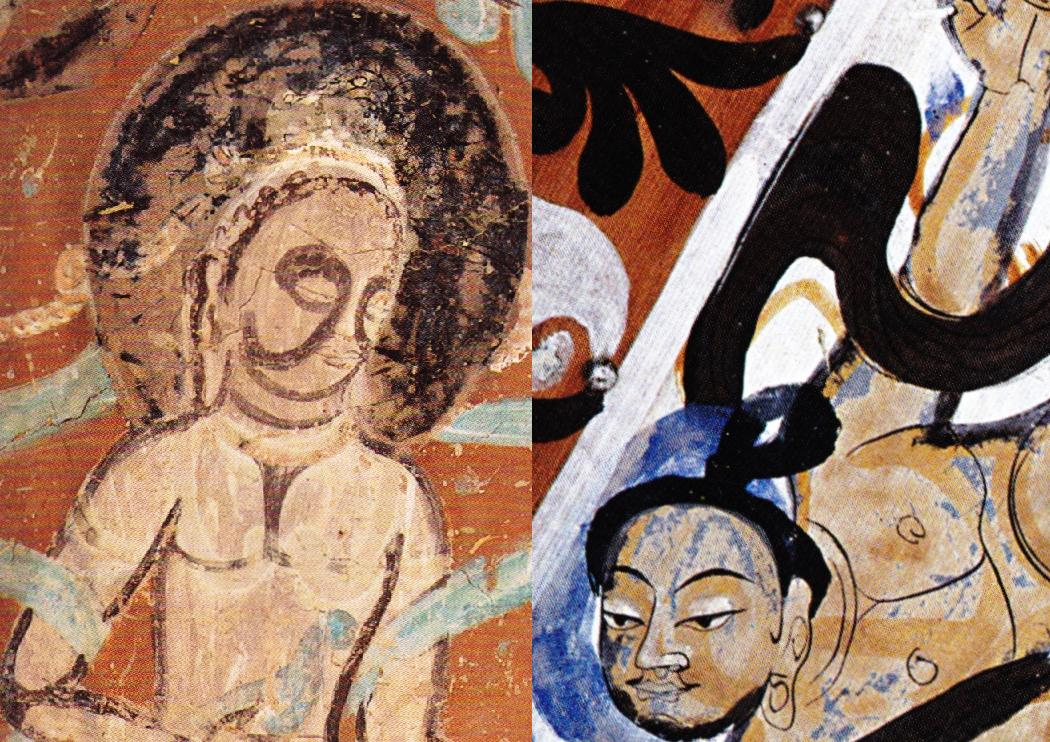
Figures showing shading technique, and on the left, the effect of darkening of the paint used in shading which changed the appearance of the figure.

While Buddhist art is stylistically distinct from secular art, the style of paintings in the caves often reflects that of contemporary secular painting (insofar as we know of this), especially those depicting secular scenes. Donor figures are generally depicted in secular style, and may include secular events associated with them. For example, scenes depicting General Zhang Yichao, who ruled over Dunhuang in a quasi-autonomous manner during the Late Tang period, include a commemoration of his victory over the Tibetans in 848. The portraits of donors increased in size during the period ruled by the Cao family who succeeded the Zhang family. The Caos formed alliances with the Uyghurs (Ganzhou Uyghur Kingdom and Kingdom of Qocho) and the Saka Kingdom of Khotan and their portraits are featured prominently in some of the caves.

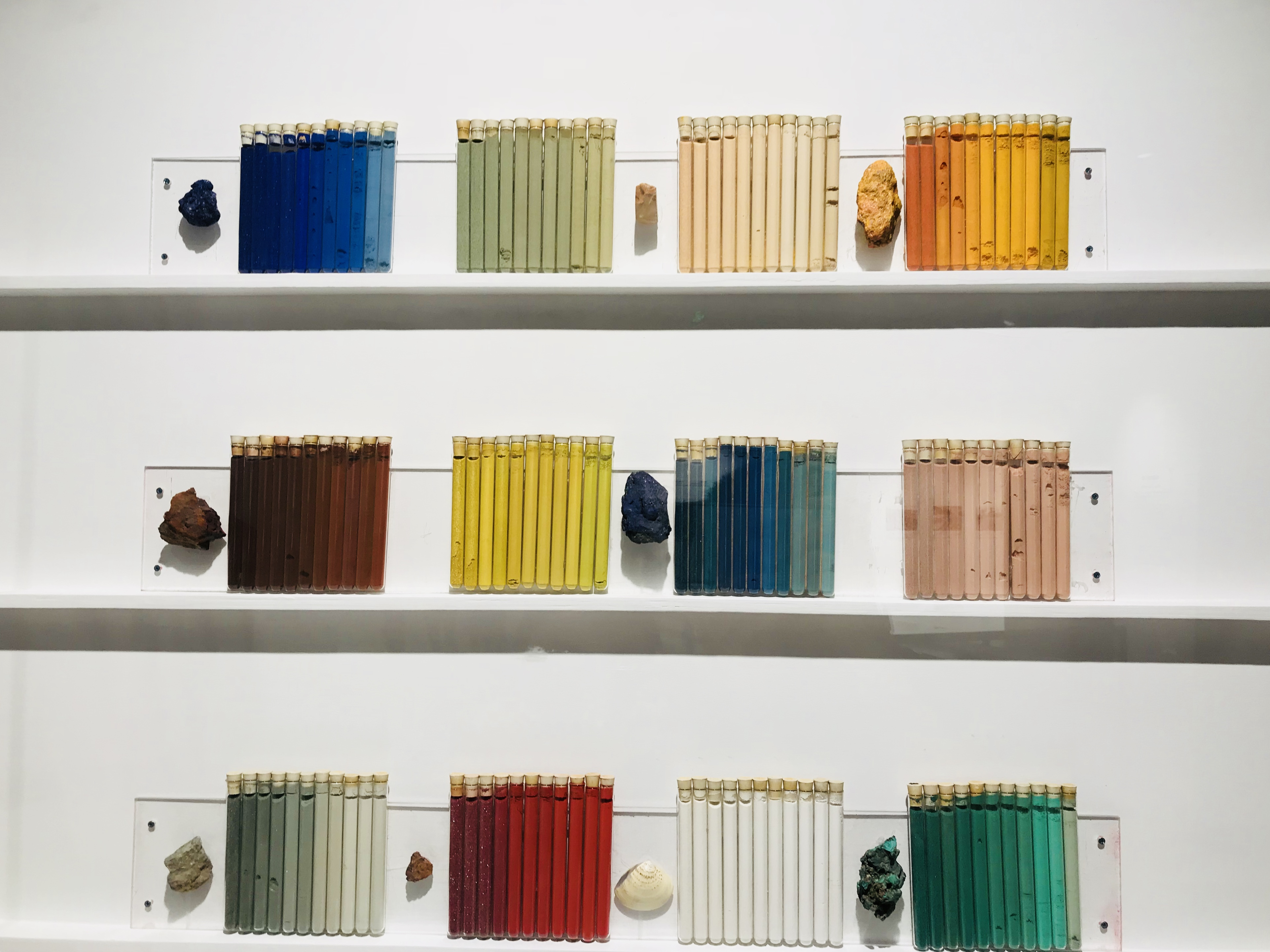
Minerals used in making the pigment for Dunhuang murals

Many of the figures have darkened due to oxidation of the lead-based pigments from exposure to air and light. Many early figures in the murals in Dunhuang also used painting techniques originated from India where shading was applied to achieve a three-dimensional or chiaroscuro effect. However, the darkening of the paint used in shading over time resulted in heavy outlines which is not what the painters had originally intended. This shading technique is unique to Dunhuang in East Asia at this period as such shading on human faces was generally not done in Chinese paintings until much later when there were influences from European paintings. Another difference from traditional Chinese painting is the presence of figures that are semi-nude, occasionally fully nude, as figures are generally fully clothed in Chinese paintings. Many of the murals have been repaired or plastered over and repainted over the centuries, and older murals may be seen where sections of later paintings had been removed.

The Getty Conservation Institute has a dedicated page to the conservation of those wall paintings.

=== Sculptures ===
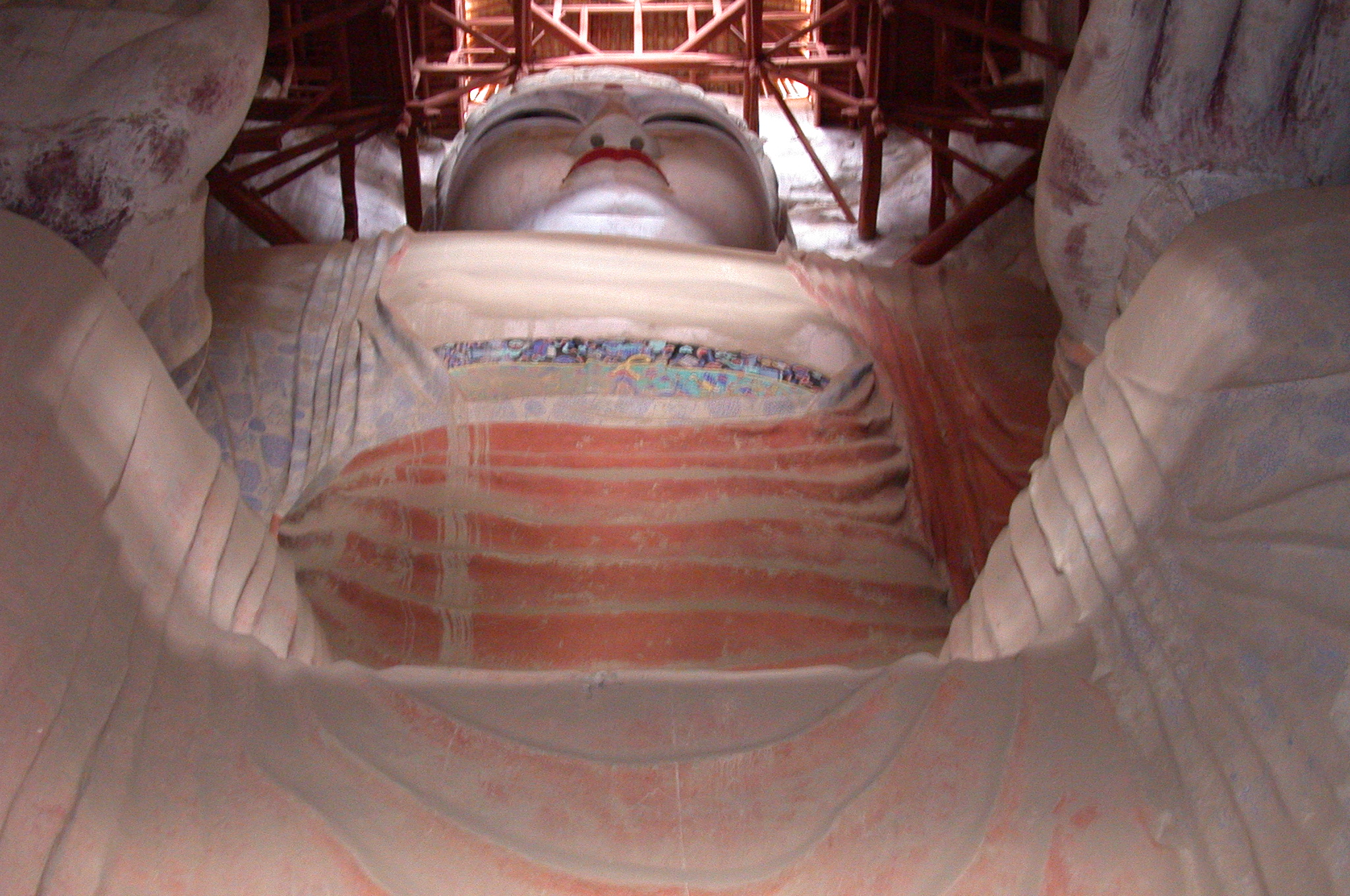
The Great Buddha of cave 96

There are around 2,400 surviving clay sculptures at Mogao. These were first constructed on a wooden frame, padded with reed, then modelled in clay stucco, and finished with paint. The giant statues however have a stone core. The Buddha is generally shown as the central statue, often attended by boddhisattvas, heavenly kings, devas, and apsaras, along with yaksas and other mythical creatures.

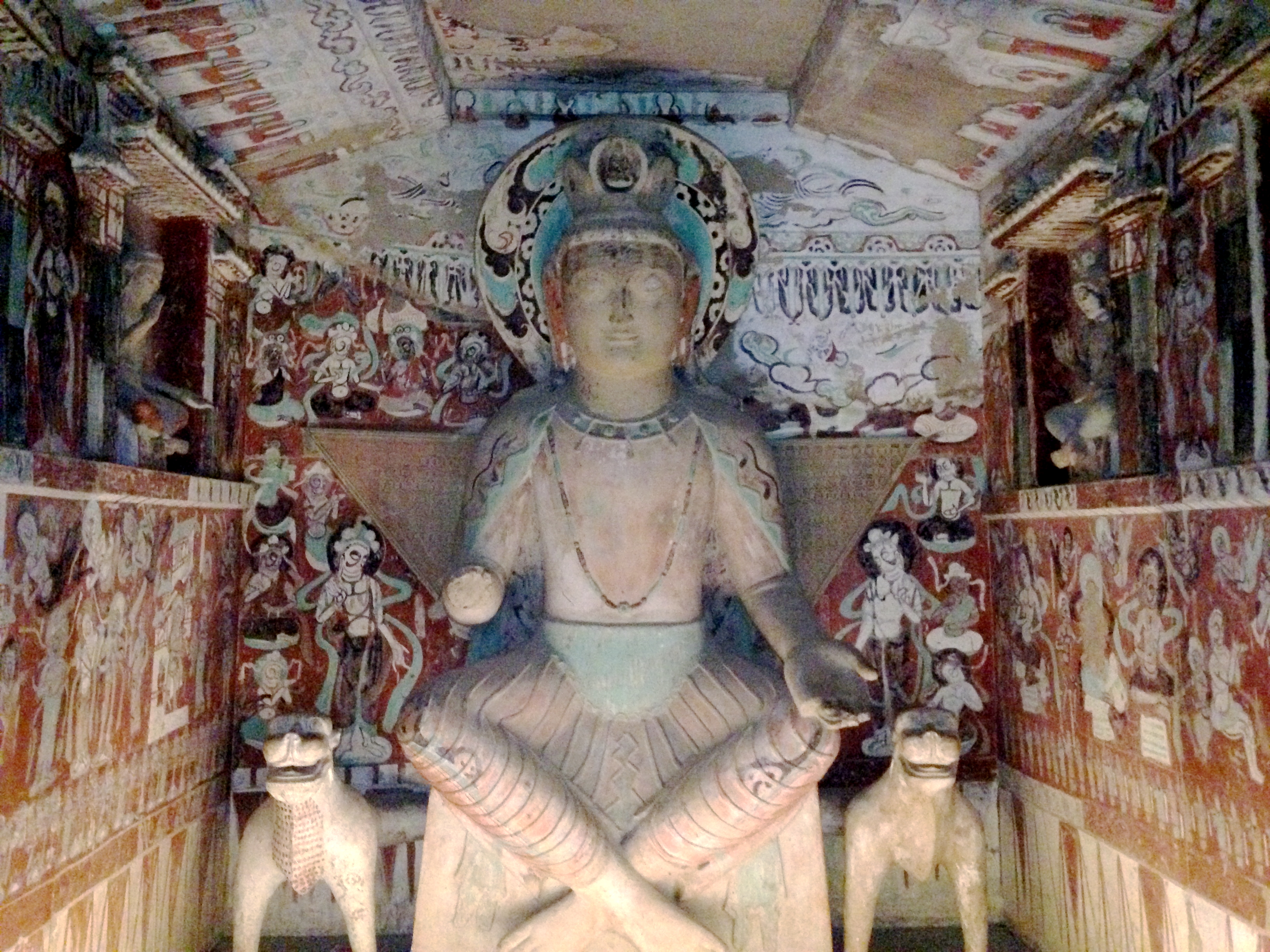
Figure of Maitreya Buddha in cave 275 from Northern Liang (397–439), one of the earliest caves. The crossed ankle figure with a three-disk crown shows influence from Kushan art.

The early figures are relatively simple and mainly of Buddhas and Bodhisattvas. The Buddhas of Northern Wei may have two attendant Bodhisattvas, and in the Northern Zhou period, two further disciples may be added, forming a group of five. Figures from the Sui and Tang periods may be present as larger groups of seven or nine, and some showed large-scale parinirvana scene with groups of mourners. The early sculptures were based on Indian and Central Asian prototypes, with some in the Greco-Indian style of Gandhara. Over time the sculptures showed more Chinese elements and became gradually sinicized.

The two giant statues represent Maitreya Buddha. The earlier and larger one in cave 96, at 35.5 m high, was constructed in 695 under the edicts from Empress Wu Zetian who instructed the constructions of monasteries in 689 and giant statues in 694. The smaller one is 27 m tall and was constructed in 713–41. The larger northern giant Buddha was damaged in an earthquake and had been repaired and restored multiple times, consequently its clothing, colour and gestures had been changed and only the head retains its original Early Tang appearance. The southern statue however is largely in its original form apart for its right hand. The larger Buddha is housed in a prominent wooden 9-storey structure.

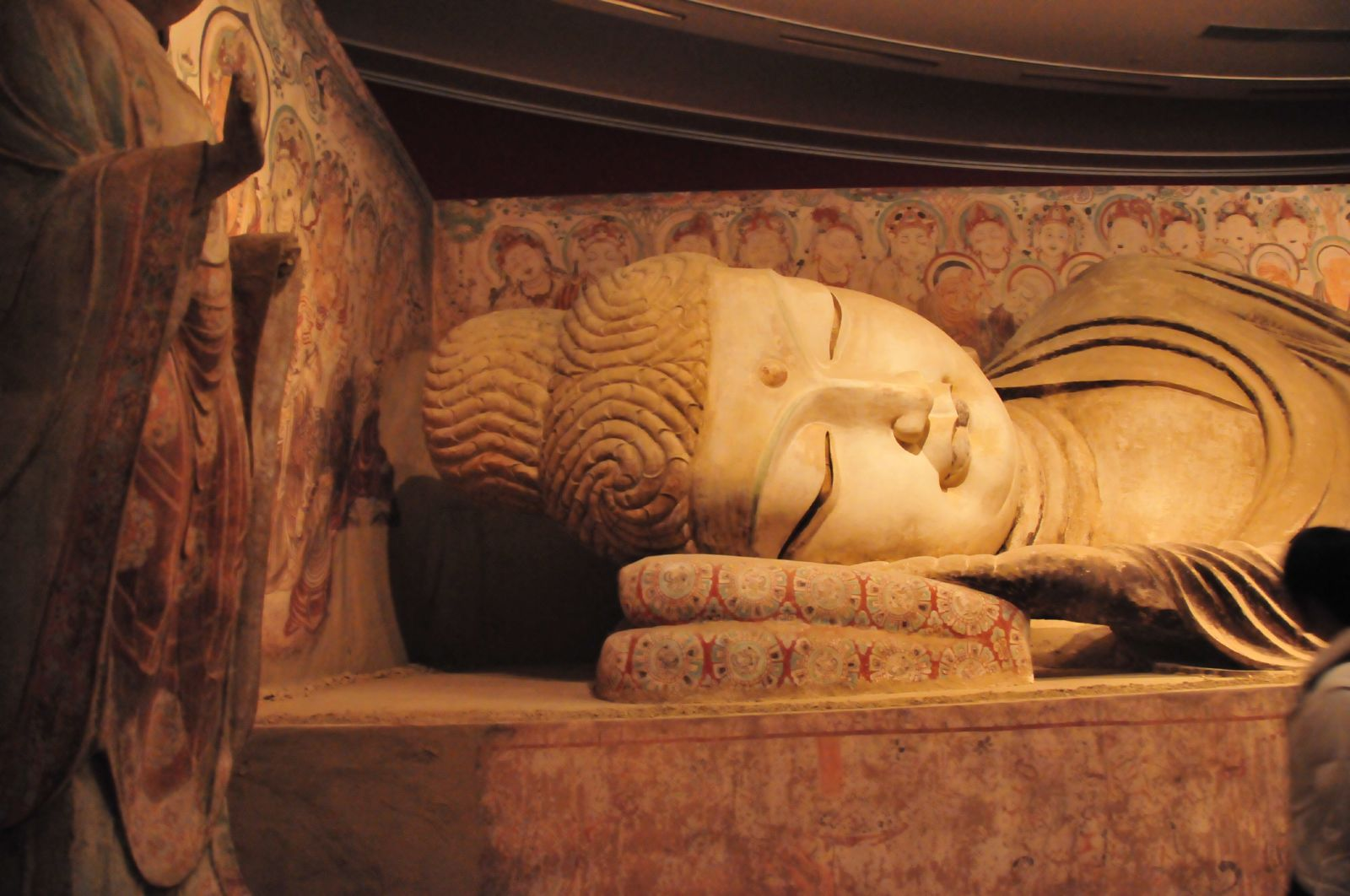
Reproduction of the reclining Buddha of the Tibetan period from cave 158. National Art Museum of China, Beijing.

One type of cave constructed during the Tibetan era is the Nirvana Cave, which features a large reclining Buddha that covers the entire length of the hall. Figures of mourners in murals or in sculptural forms are also depicted along the length of the hall behind the Buddha. The Buddha figure in cave 158 measures 15.6 m long.

The original function of the "Library Cave" was as a shrine commemorating Hong Bian, the 9th-century monk. His portrait statue, unusual here and among all surviving works in China, was removed to another spot when the cave was sealed up in the 11th century, but has been returned now the library has been removed. There is also a stone stele describing his life, and the wall behind the statue is painted with attendant figure; such blending of painted sculpture and wall paintings into a single composition is very common at the site.

=== Paintings on silk and paper ===
Before the discovery in the Library Cave, original paintings on silk and paper from the Tang dynasty, an influential period in Chinese art, were very rare, and most of the surviving examples were copies made in later periods. Over a thousand paintings on silk, banners, and embroideries were found in the Library Cave, none apparently dating before the late 7th century. The great majority of the paintings are anonymous, but many are of high quality, especially from the Tang. Most are sutra paintings, images of Buddha, and narrative paintings. The paintings show something of the contemporary Chinese style of the capital Chang'an, but many also reflect Indian, Tibetan and Uighur painting styles.

There are brush paintings in ink alone, some in just two colours, as well as many in full colour. Most common are single figures, and most paintings were probably donated by an individual, who is often portrayed on a diminutive scale. The donor figures become notably more elaborate in dress by the 10th century.

=== Printed images ===
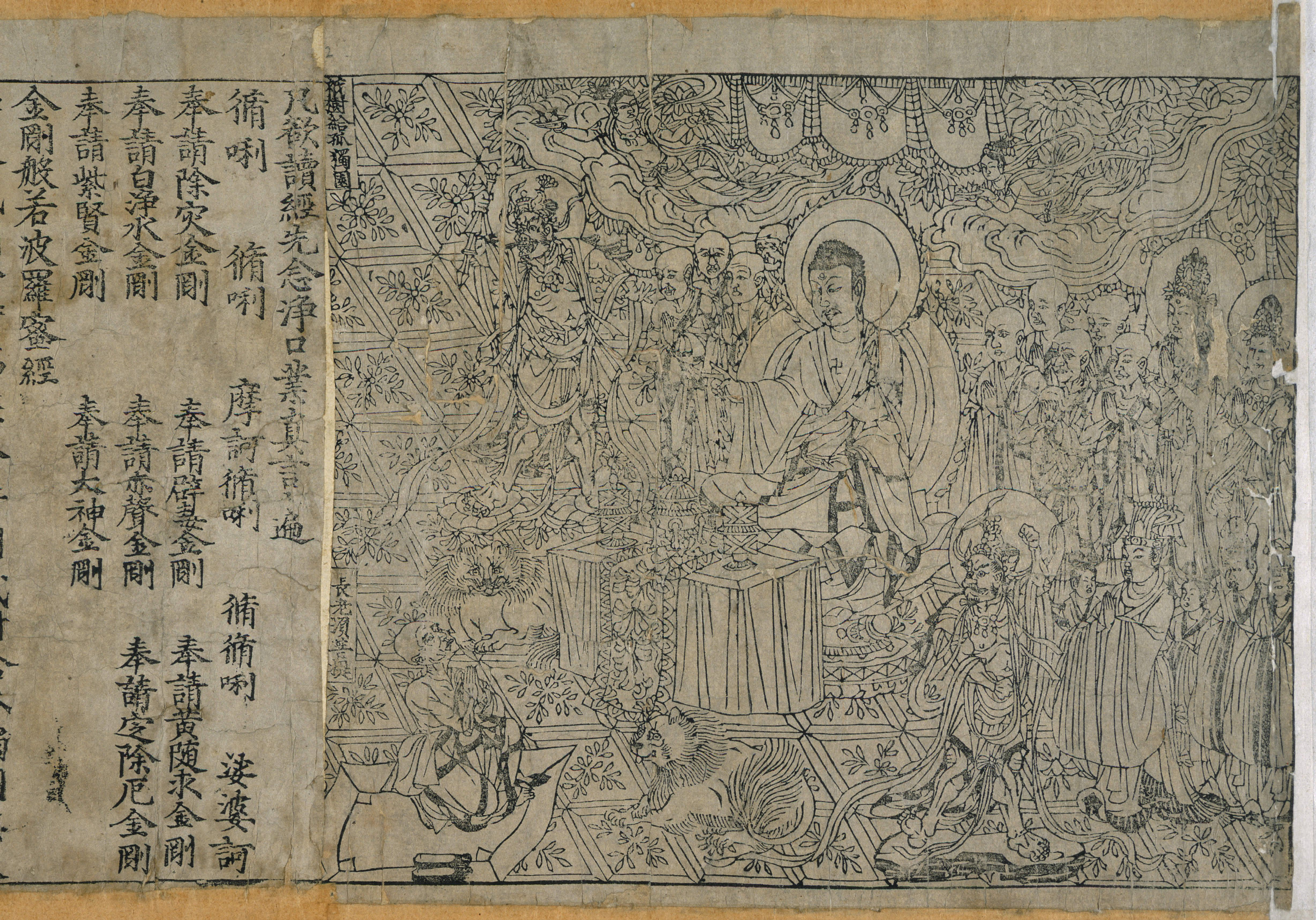
The Chinese Diamond Sūtra, the oldest known dated printed book in the world, British Library Or.8210/P.2.

The Library Cave is equally important as a source of rare early images and texts produced by woodblock printing, including the famous Diamond Sutra, the earliest printed book to survive. Other printed images were made to be hung, often with text below containing prayers and sometimes a dedication by the pious commissioner; at least two prints were commissioned by Cao Yuanzhong, Imperial Commissioner at Dunhuang in 947. Many of the images have colour added by hand to the printed outline. Several sheets contain repeated impressions of the same block with a Buddha image. Possibly these reflect stock for cutting when sold to pilgrims, but inscriptions in some examples show these were also printed out at different times by an individual as a devotion to acquire merit. It is unclear whether such people owned their own blocks, or visited a monastery to have the images printed.

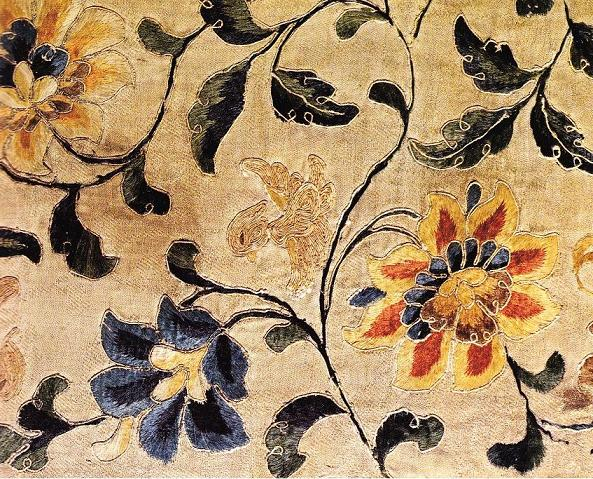
Detail of embroidered panel from the Library Cave. A small duck is shown in the middle among the flowers. Tang dynasty.

=== Textiles ===
The textiles found in the Library Cave include silk banners, altar hangings, wrappings for manuscripts, and monks' apparel (kāṣāya). The monks normally used fabrics consisting of a patchwork of different scraps of cloth as a sign of humility; these therefore provide valuable insights into the various type of silk cloth and embroidery available at the time. Silk banners were used to adorn the cliff-face at the caves during festivals, and these are painted and may be embroidered. Valances used to decorate altars and temples had a horizontal strip at the top, from which hung streamers made from strips of different cloths ending in a V that look like a modern male necktie.

== Caves ==
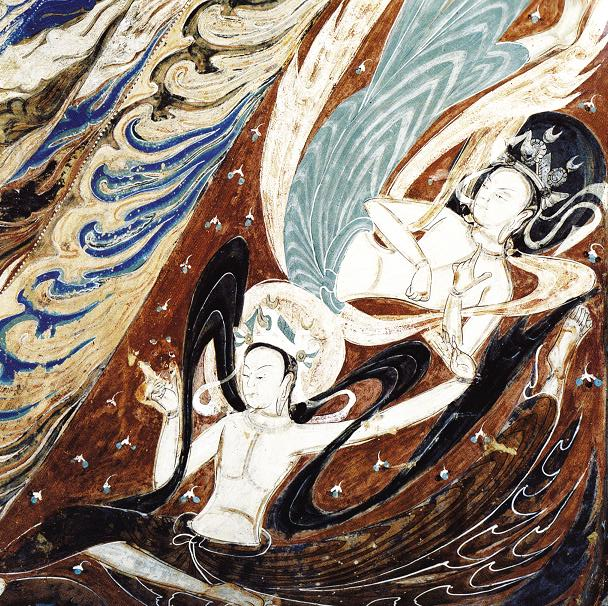
Flying apsaras, or celestial beings. Caves 285, 538-539 AD, Western Wei dynasty

The caves were cut into the side of a cliff which is close to two kilometers long. At its height, during the Tang dynasty, there were more than a thousand caves, but over time many of the caves were lost, including the earliest caves. 735 caves currently exist in Mogao; the best-known ones are the 487 caves located in the southern section of the cliff which are places of pilgrimage and worship. 248 caves have also been found to the north which were living quarters, meditation chambers, and burial sites for the monks. The caves at the southern section are decorated, while those at the northern section are mostly plain.

Local rich clans built several of the caves in Dunhuang as "family caves." People used these caves to show their religious devotion and strengthen their family's sense of identity. Inscriptions from patrons and images of donors in the caverns generally focus on family ties and social status.

The caves are clustered together according to their era, with new caves from a new dynasty being constructed in different parts of the cliff. From the murals, sculptures, and other objects found in the caves, the dates of around five hundred caves have been determined. The following is a list of the caves by era, compiled in the 1980s (more have been identified since):

- Sixteen Kingdoms (366–439) - 7 caves, the oldest dated to Northern Liang period.
- Northern Wei (439–534) and Western Wei (535-556) - 10 from each phase
- Northern Zhou (557–580) - 15 caves
- Sui dynasty (581–618) - 70 caves
- Early Tang (618–704) - 44 caves
- High Tang (705–780) - 80 caves
- Middle Tang (781–847) - 44 caves (This era in Dunhuang is also known as the Tibetan period because Dunhuang was then under Tibetan occupation.)
- Guiyijun period (歸義軍; 'Return to Righteousness Army', 848–1036), when Dunhuang was ruled by the Zhang and Cao families. It may be subdivided into the following periods:

- Late Tang (848–906) - 60 caves
- The Five Dynasties (907–960) - 32 caves
- Song dynasty (960–1035) - 43 caves

- Western Xia (1036–1226) - 82 caves
- Yuan dynasty (1227–1368) - 10 caves

== Gallery ==
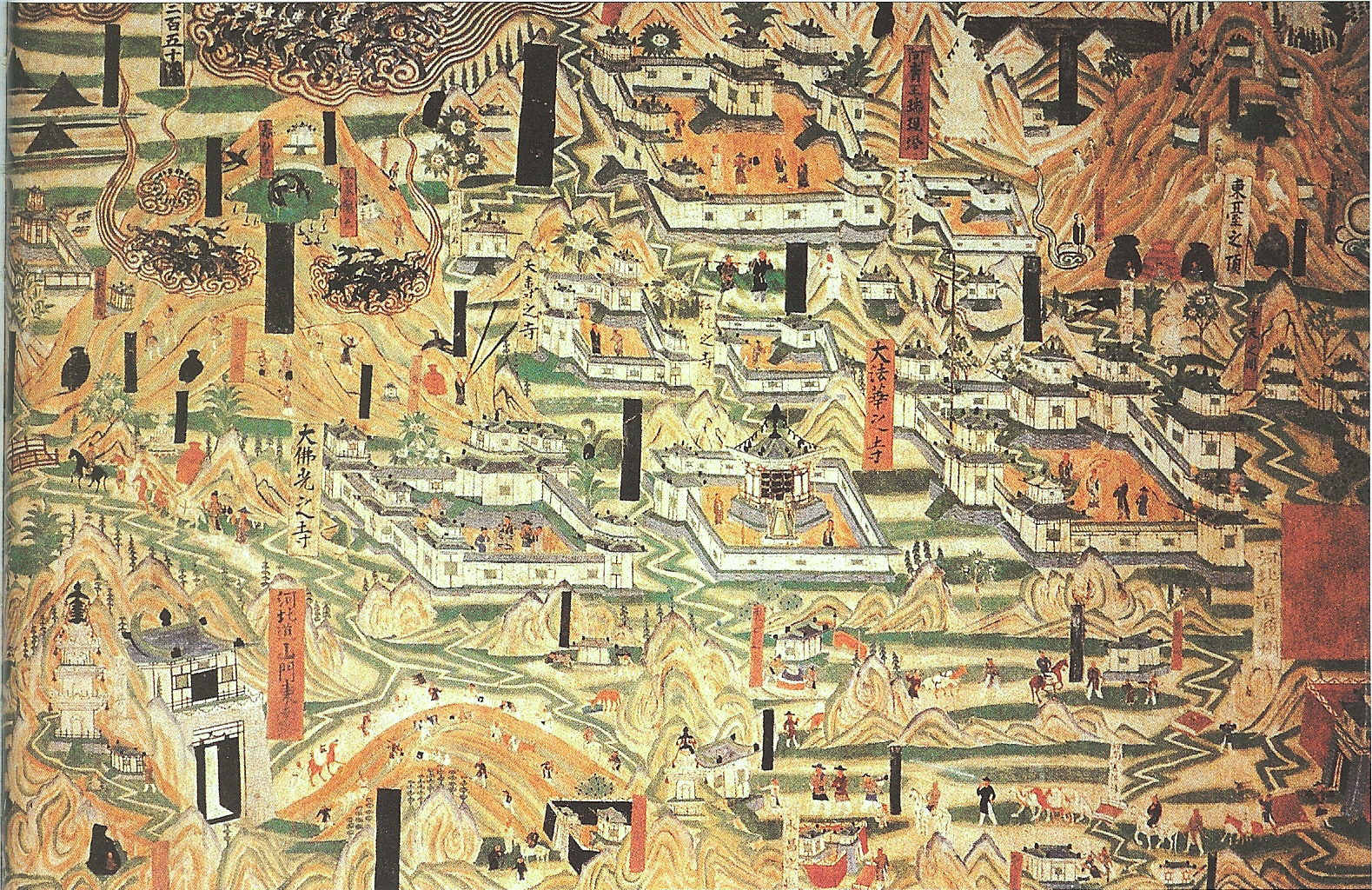
10th century mural from Cave 61, showing Tang Buddhist monasteries of Mount Wutai, Shanxi province

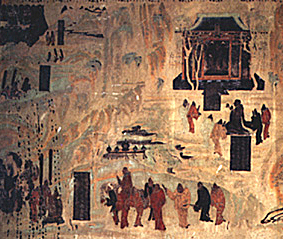
The travel of Zhang Qian to the West, complete view, c. 700

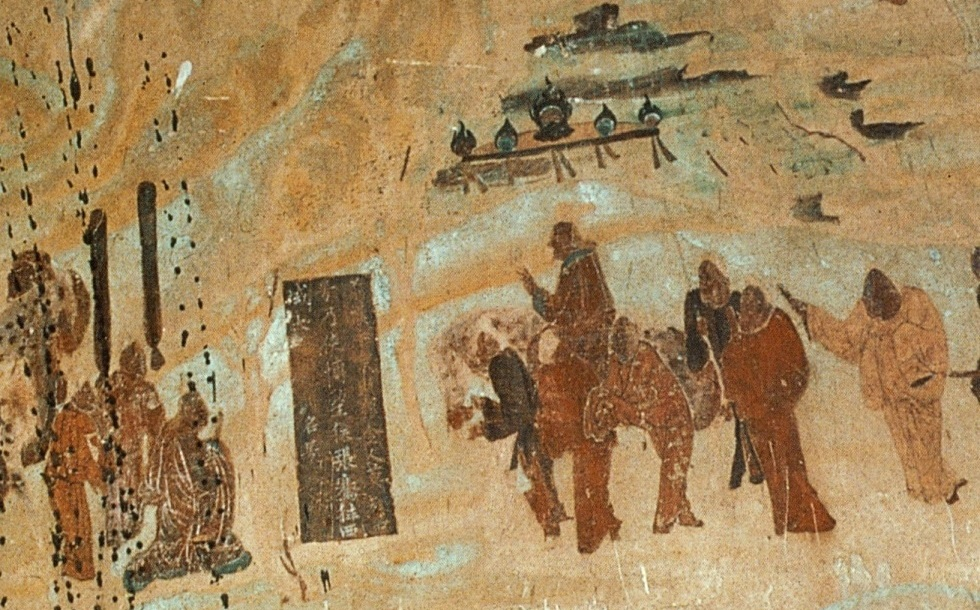
The travel of Zhang Qian to the West, details of mural from cave 323, 618–712

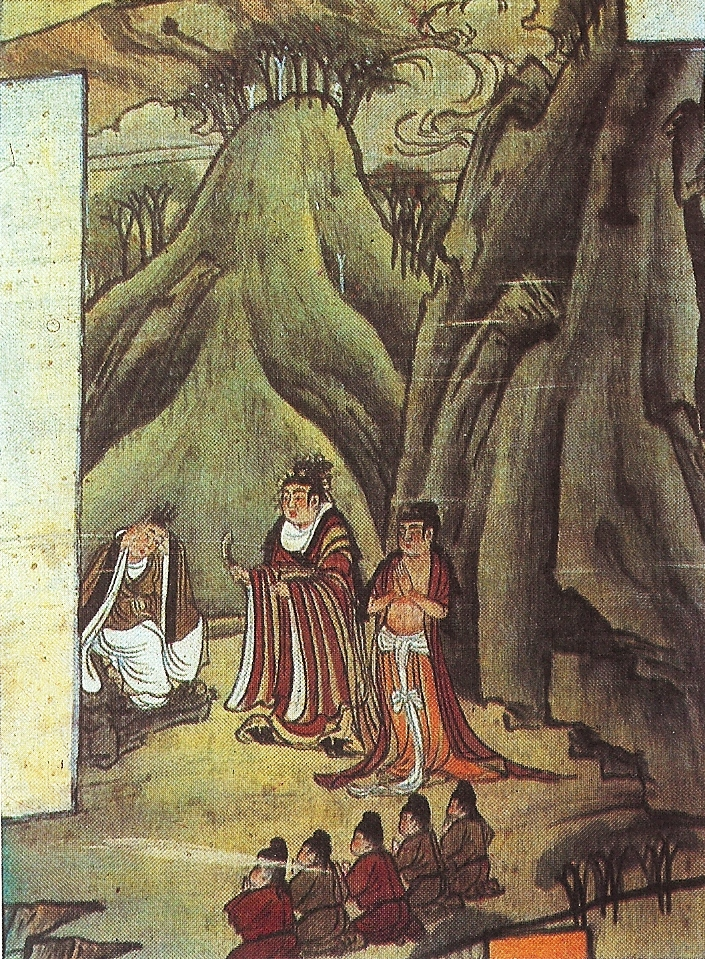
A Tang Chinese silk landscape painting depicting a young Sakyamuni cutting his hair

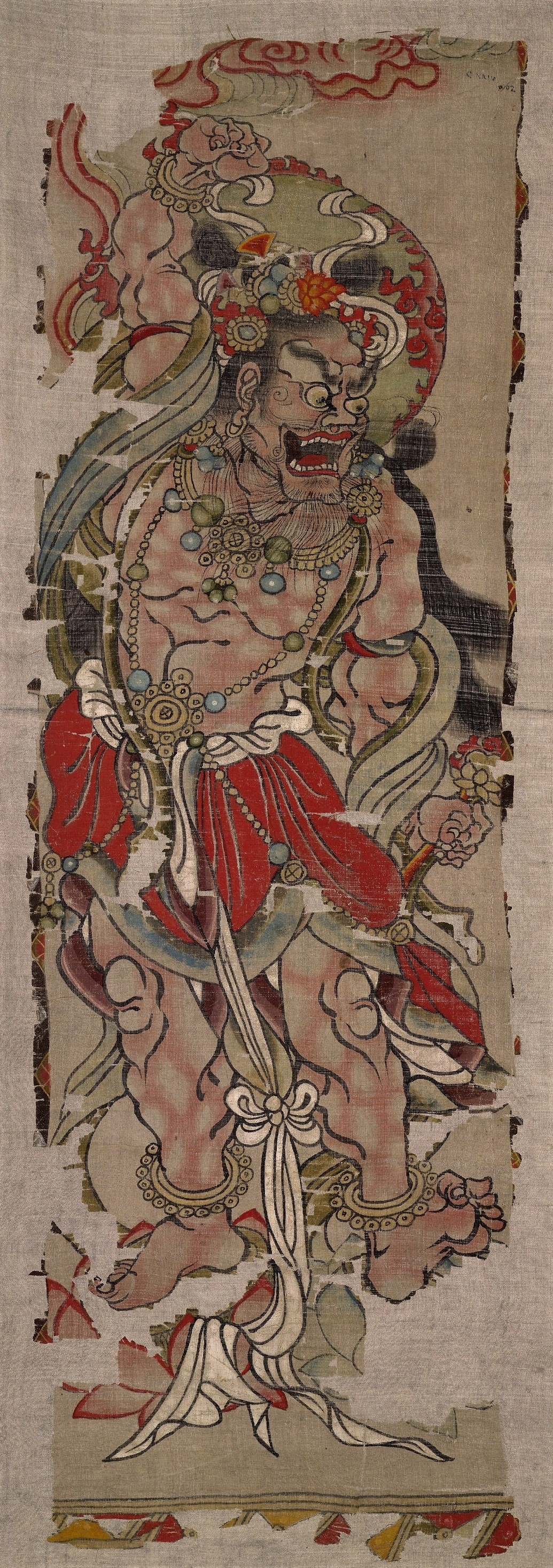
Vajrapani Painting at Mogao Caves (Library Cave)

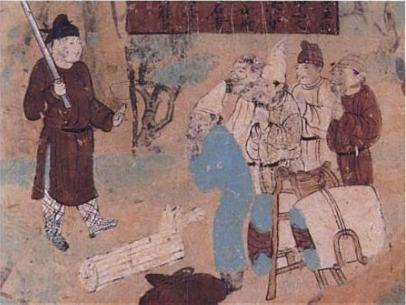
Bandit attacks

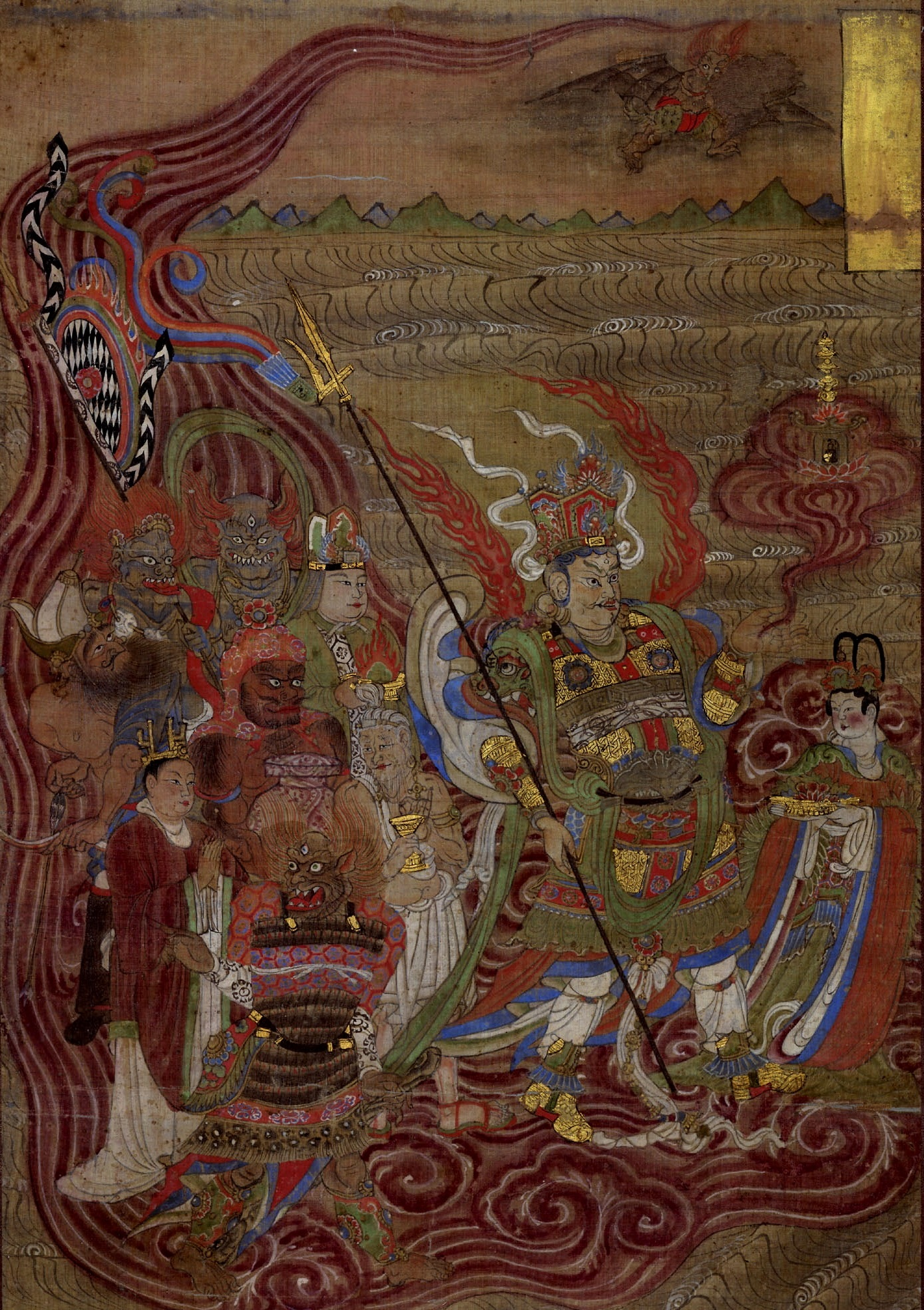
Vaishravana riding across the waters. Five Dynasties, mid-10th century.

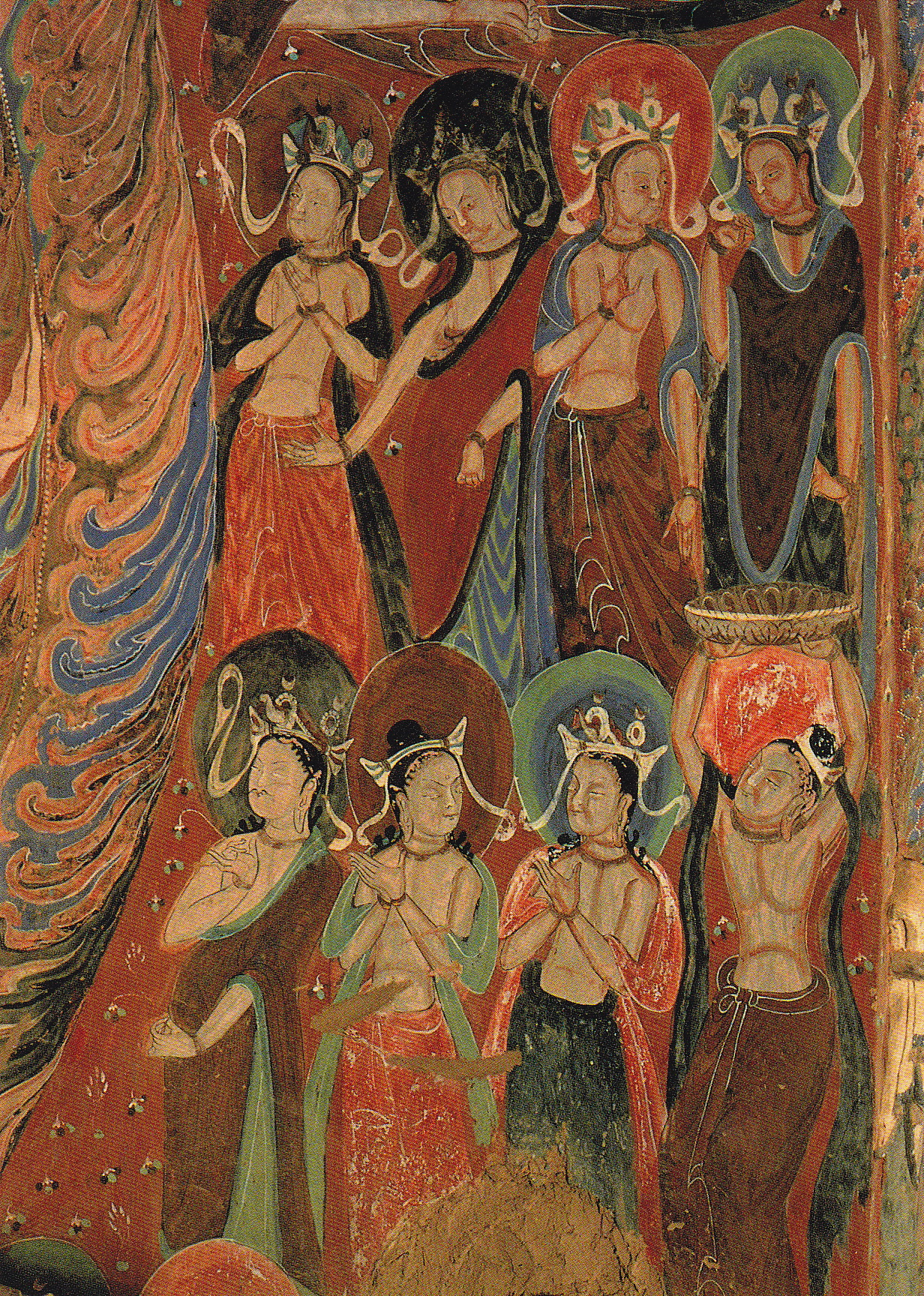
Worshipping Bodhisattva, cave 285, Wei dynasty.

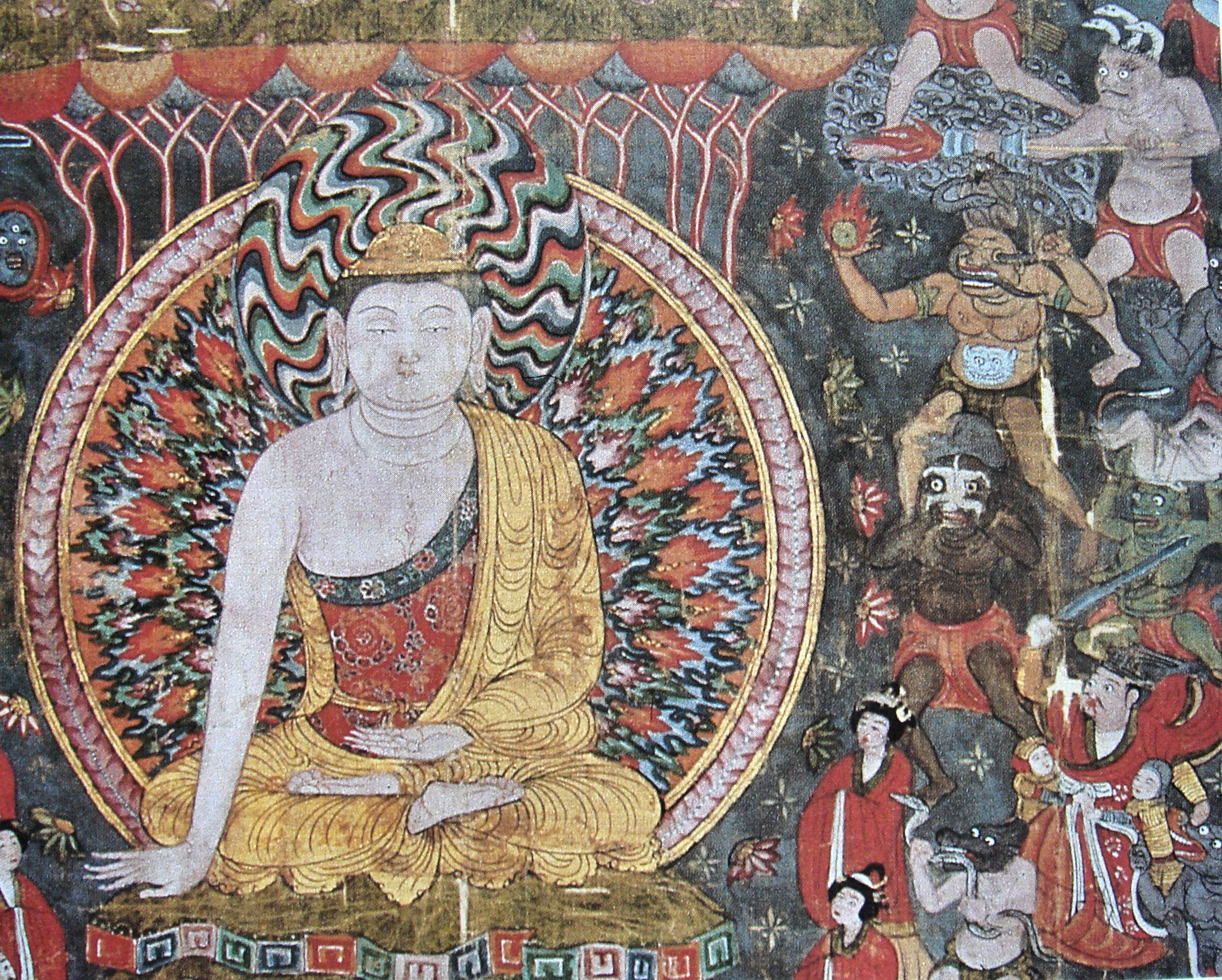
An illustration of Sakyamuni's temptation by Mara

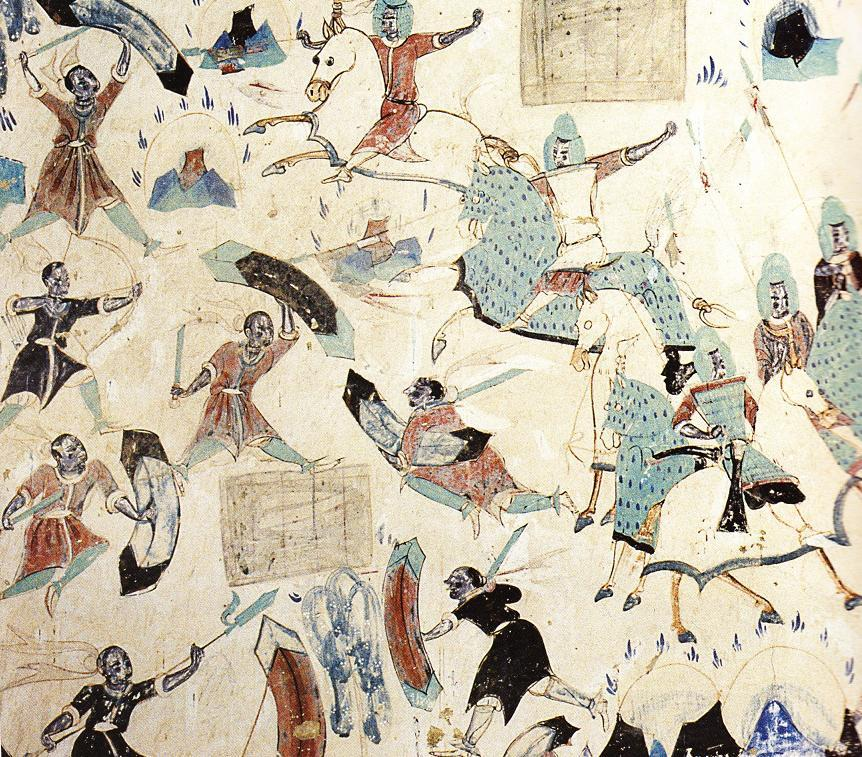
Depiction of the avadana story of Five Hundred Robbers. Cave 285, Western Wei.

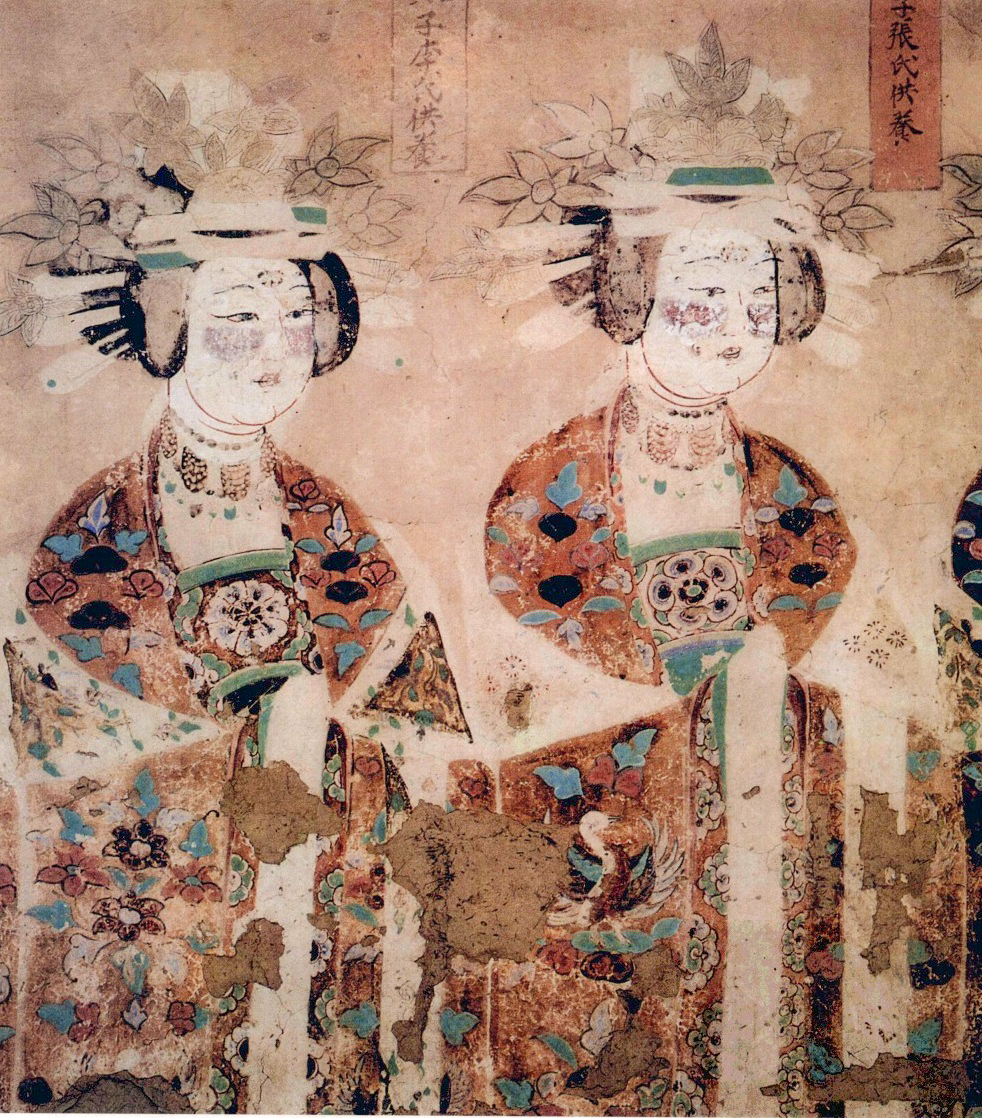
Young female Buddhist donors. Cave 98, Five Dynasties era.

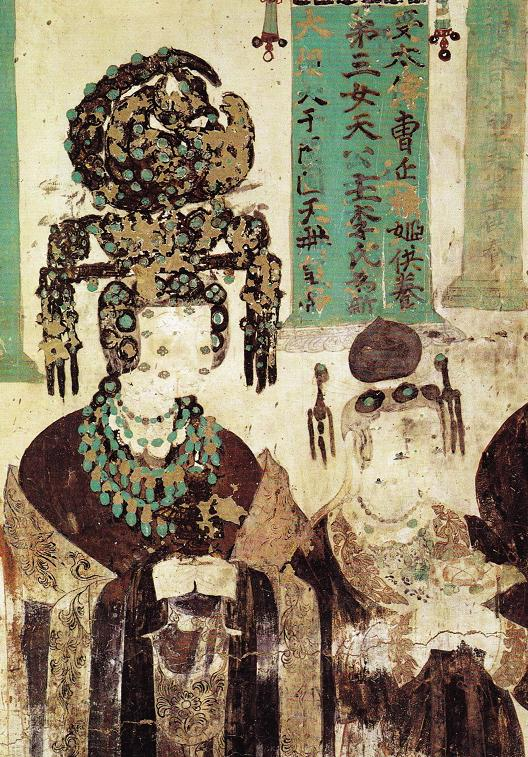
Wife of Dunhuang ruler Cao Yanlu and daughter of the King of Khotan, wearing an elaborate jade headdress. Cave 61, Five Dynasties.

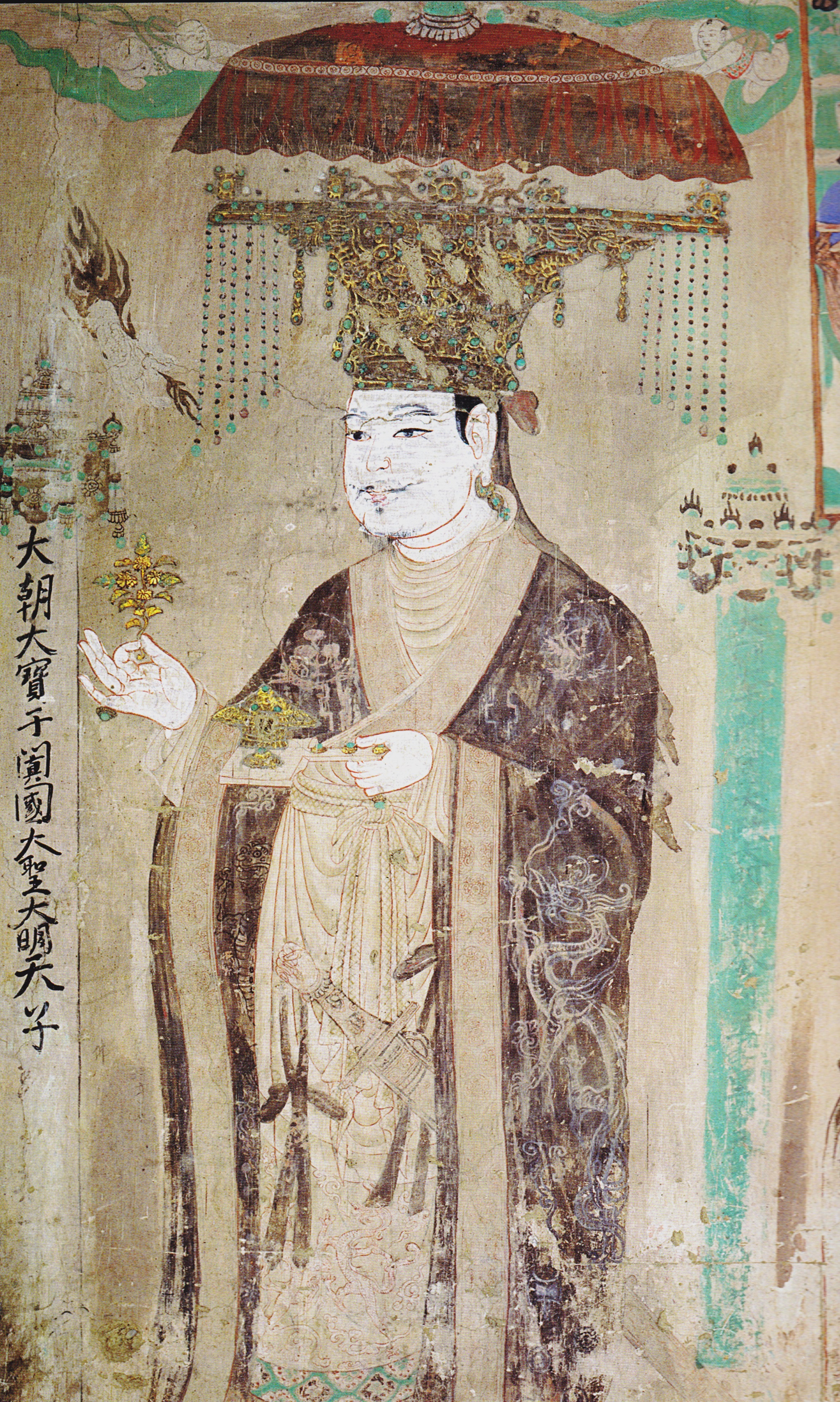
King of Khotan

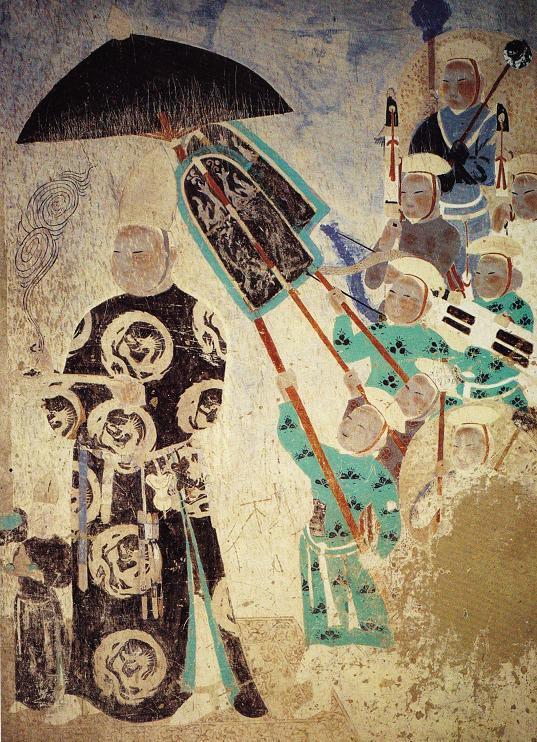
Uighur king attended by servants. Cave 409, Western Xia.

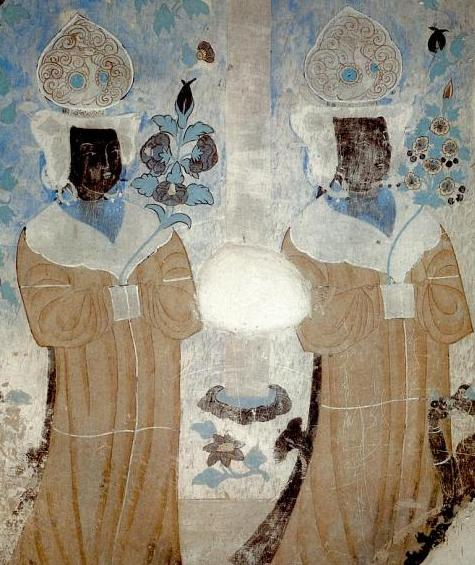
Figures from cave 409, Western Xia.

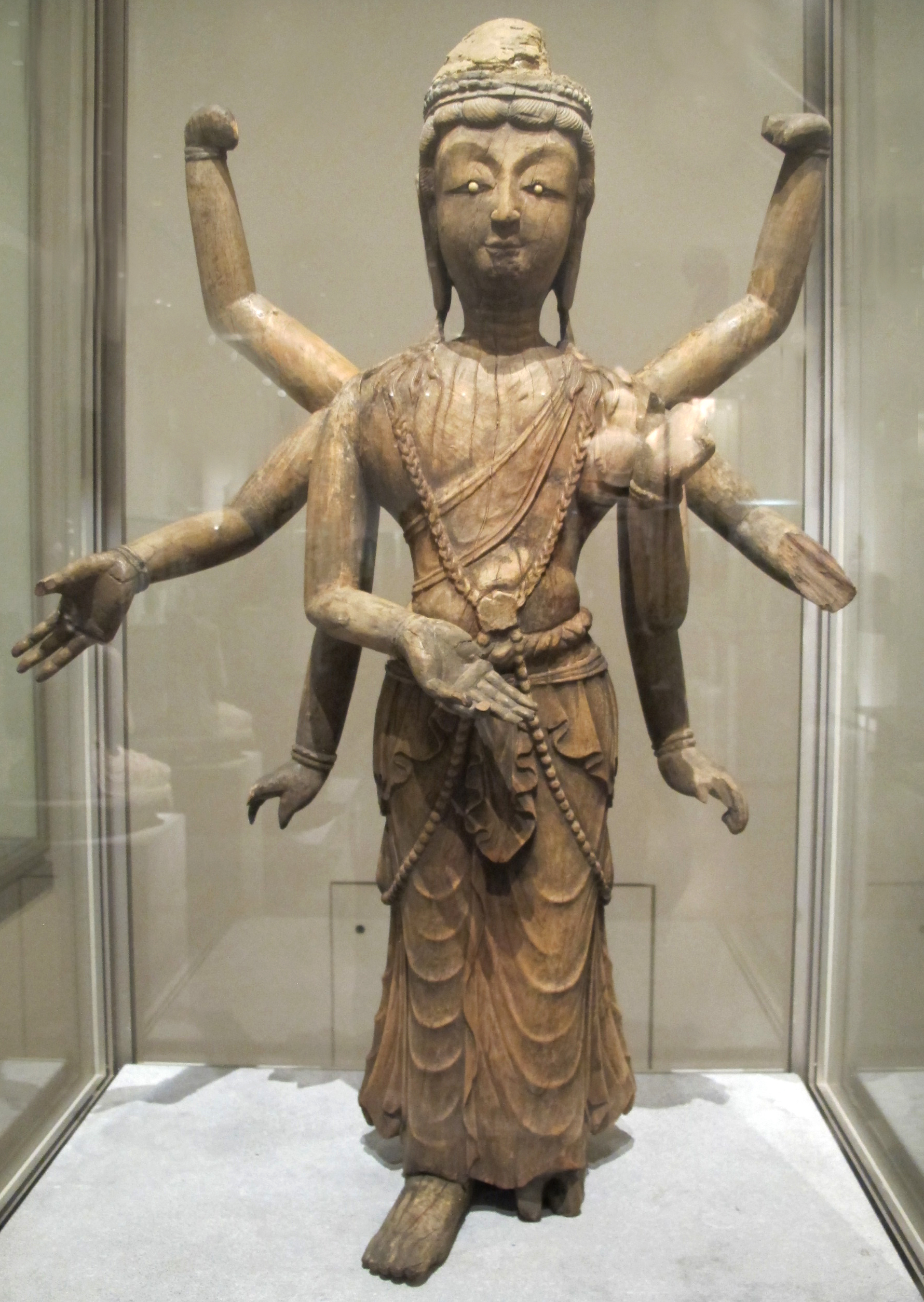
Sculpture of Bodhisattva Avalokitesvara from Mogao Caves, 890–910, Musée Guimet

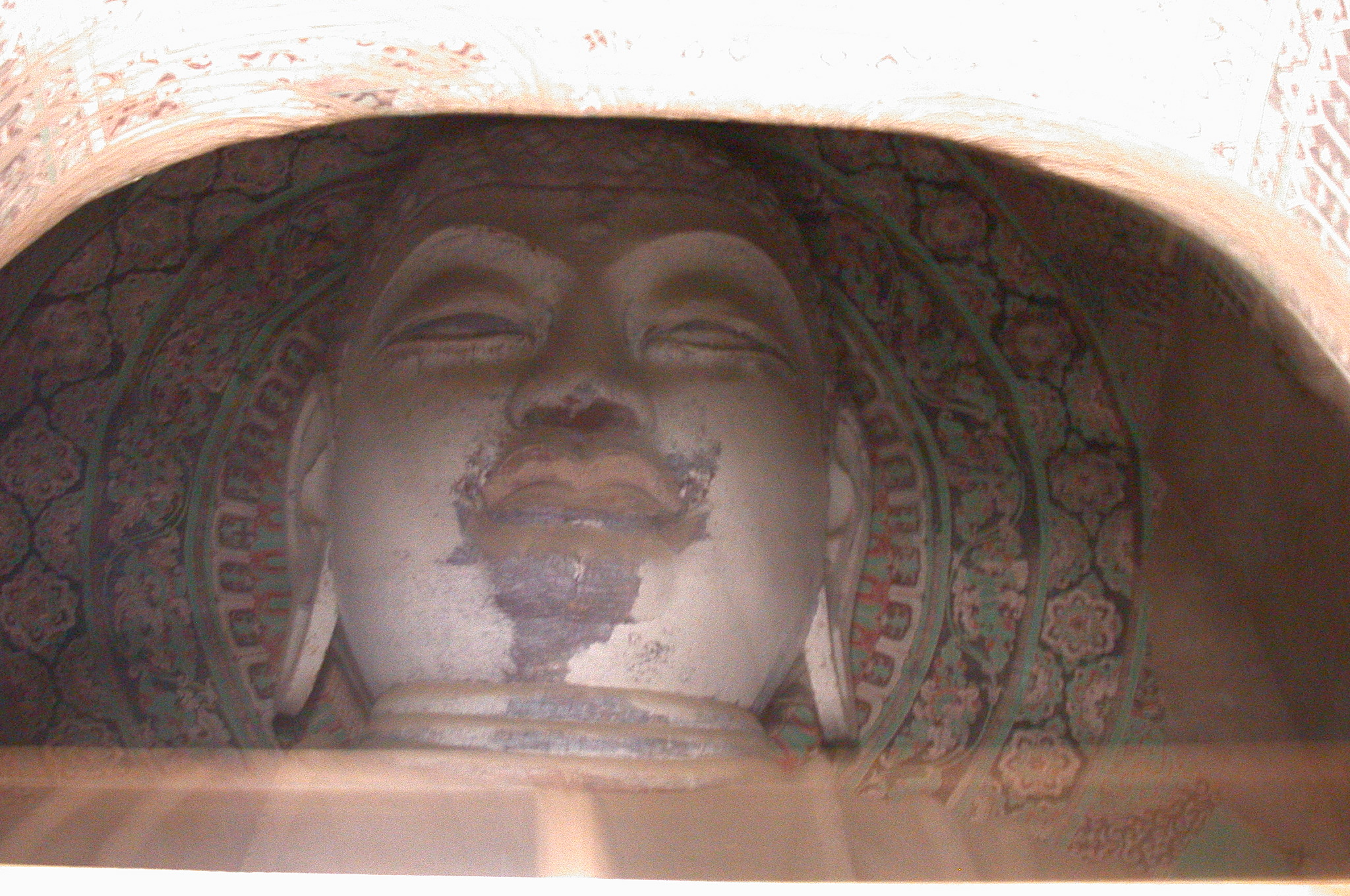
Great Buddha of cave 130

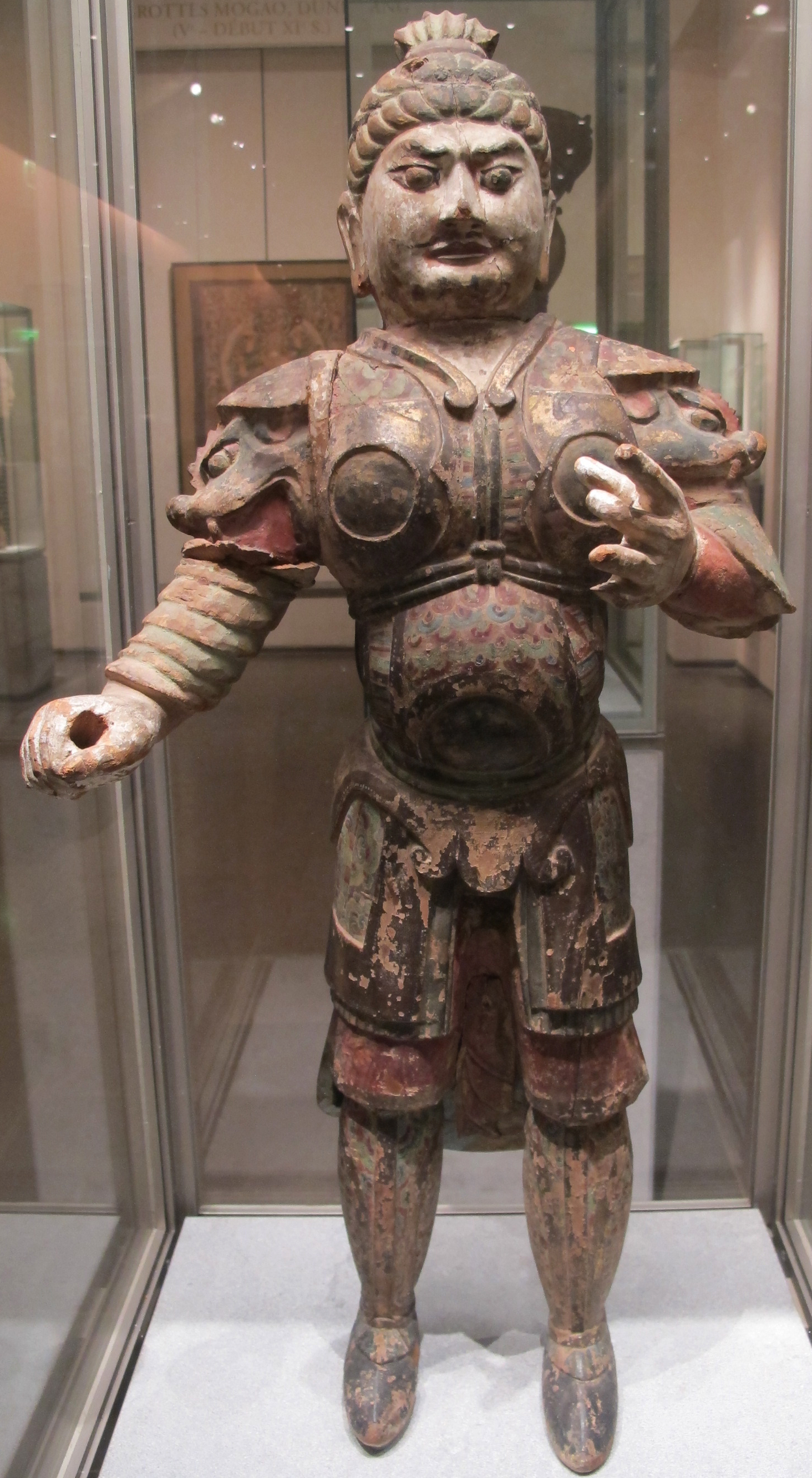
Lokapala guardian figure, Musée Guimet

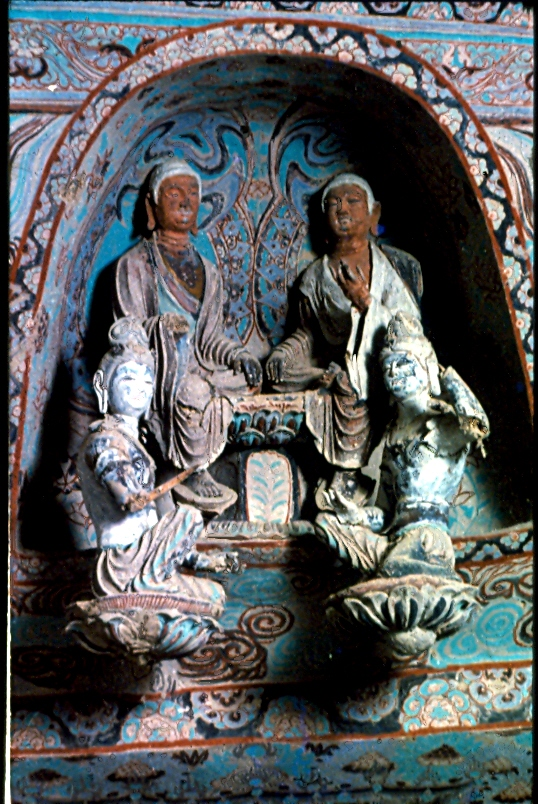
Sculptures in a niche above a main Buddha figure, Mogao cave 27, High Tang

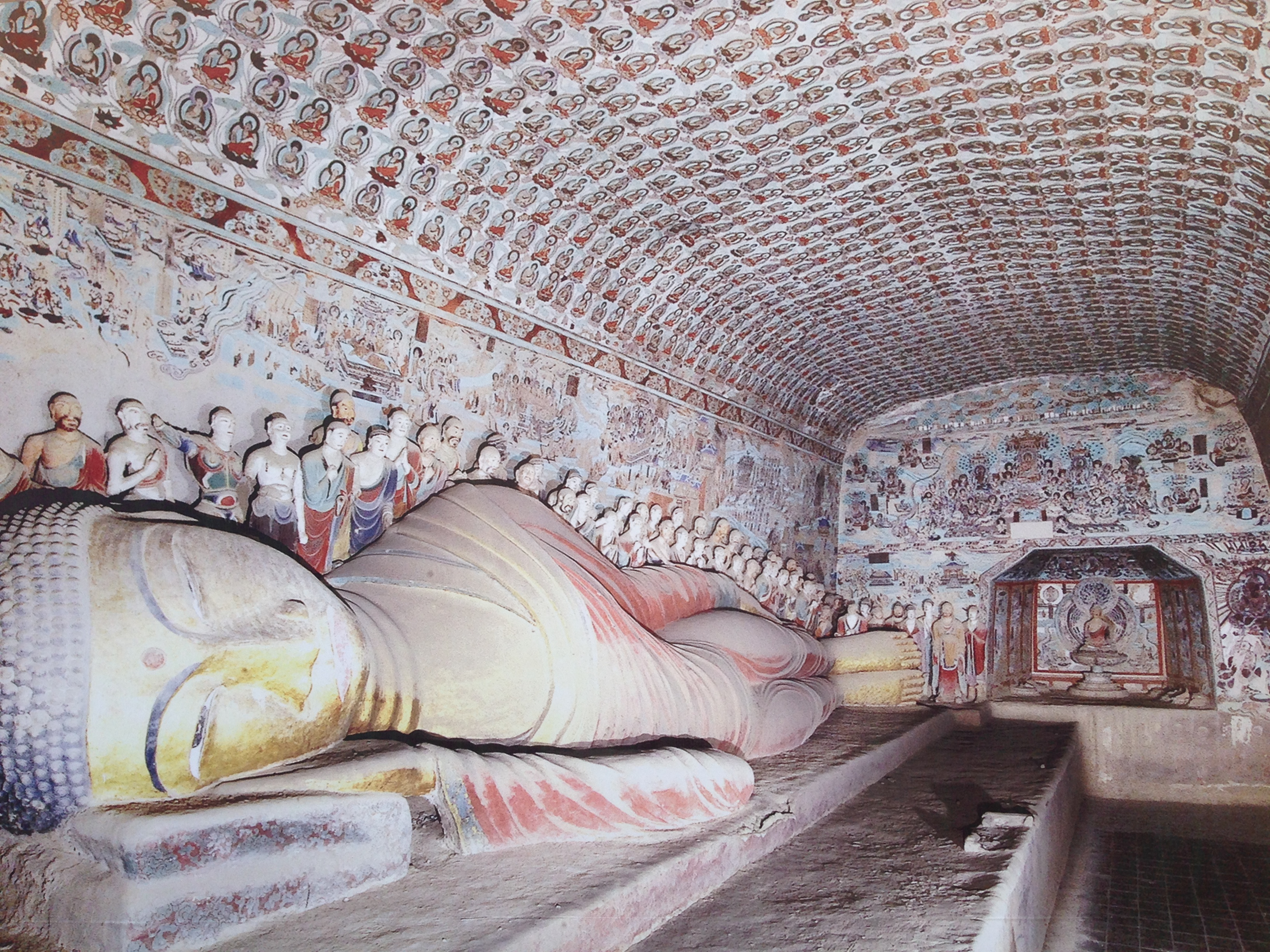
Reclining Buddha in cave 148, second largest reclining figure in Mogao. High Tang period.

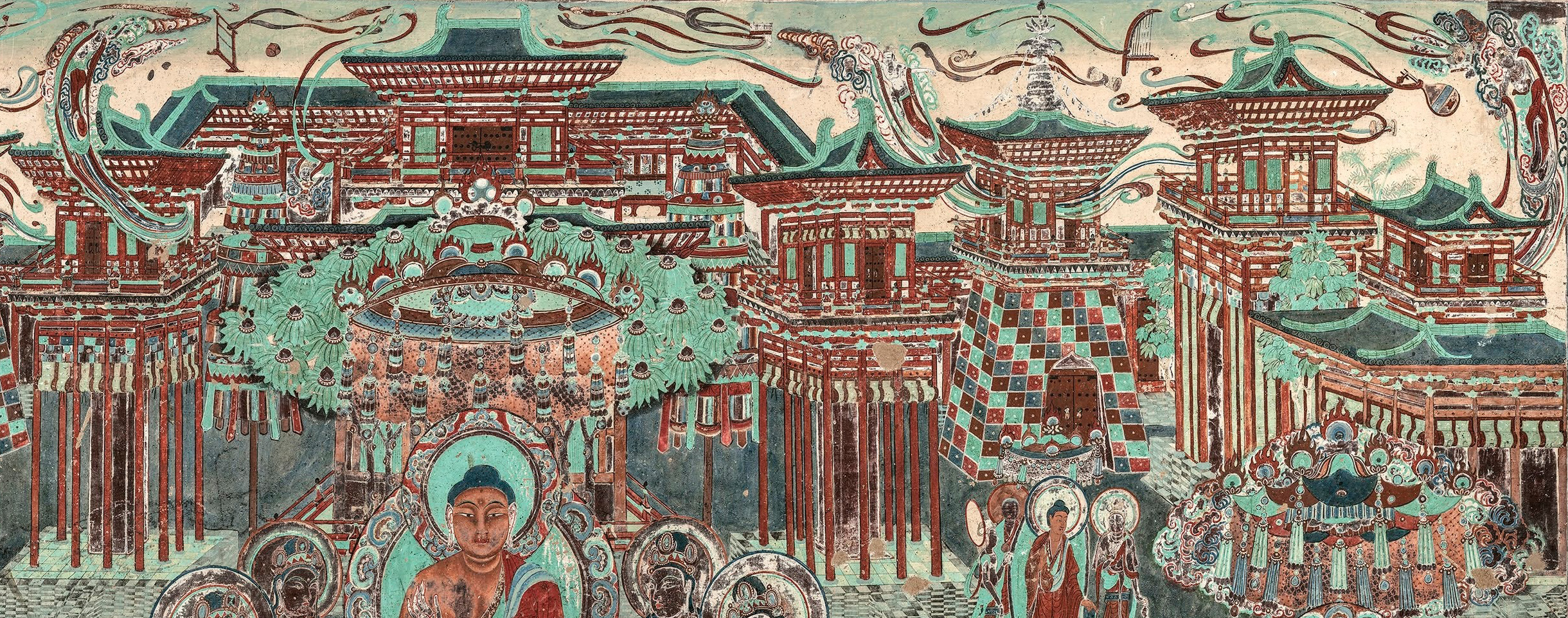
A fresco shows the style of architecture of the Tang dynasty.

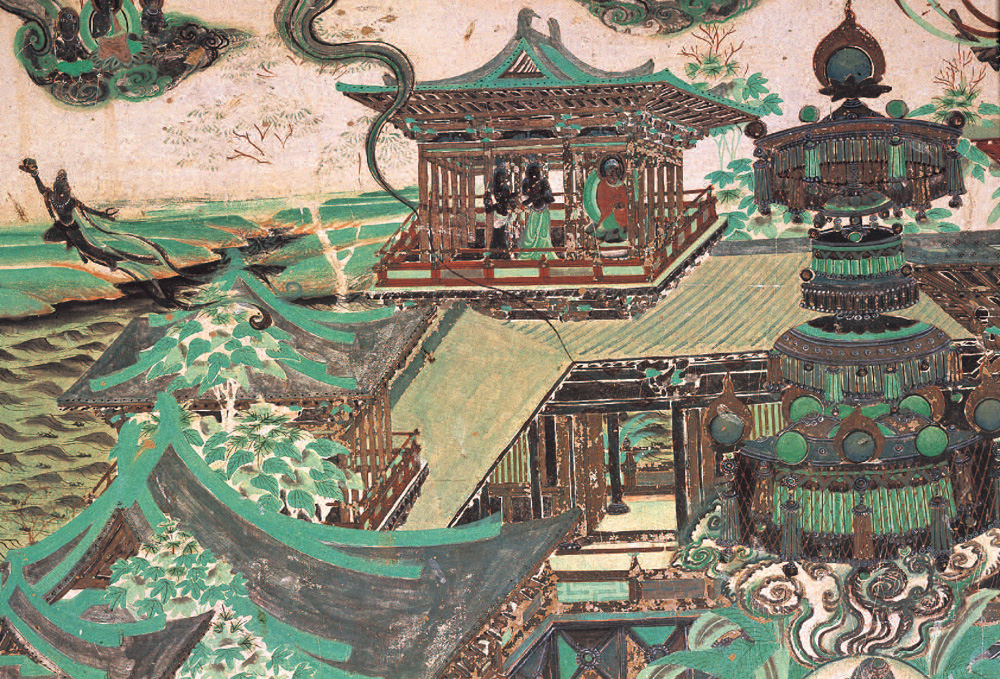
A fresco shows the Tang style architecture in the Buddhist land.

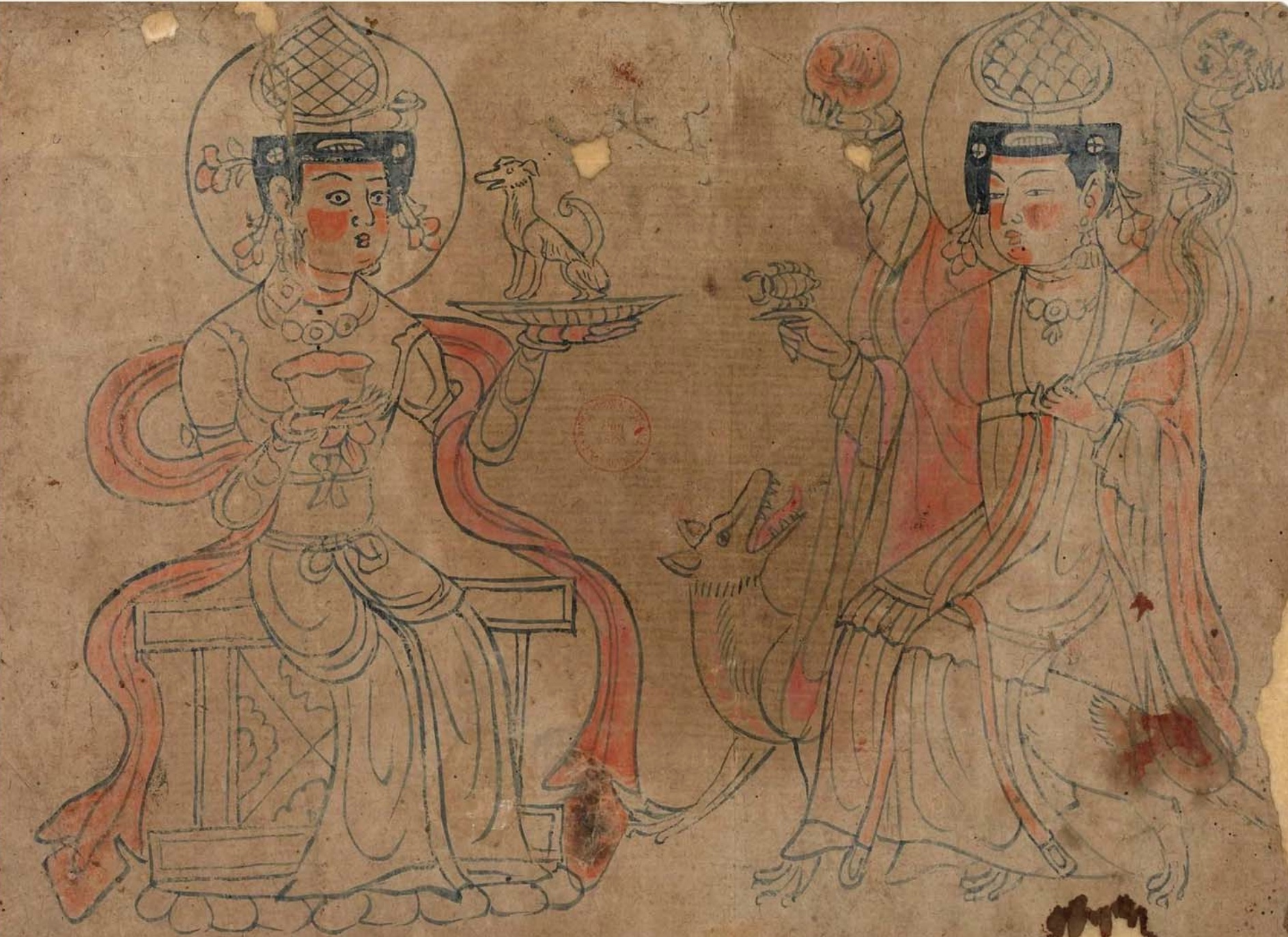
Sogdian Daēnās depicting two Zoroastrian deities once worshipped by the Sogdians

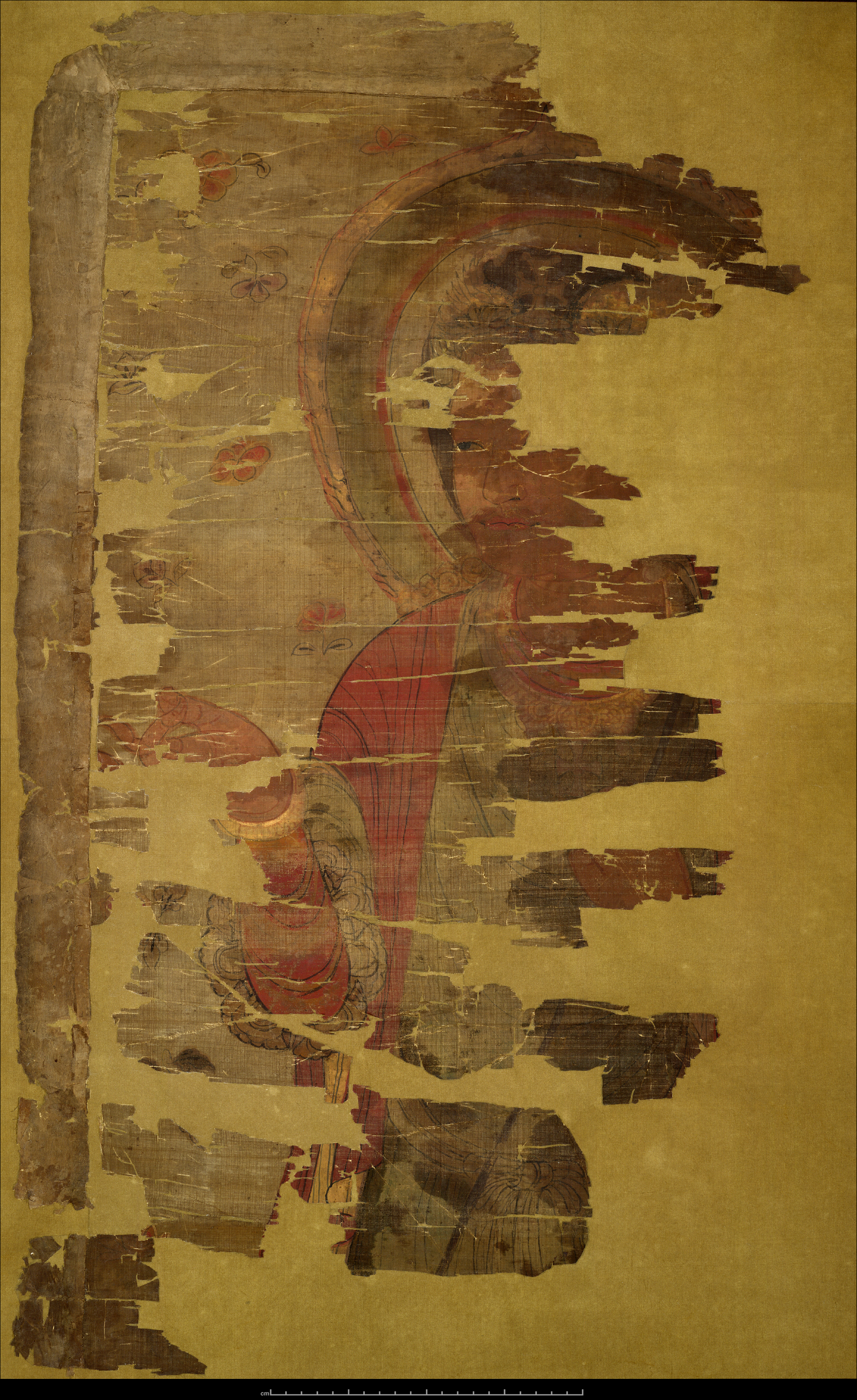
Church of the East painting of Jesus Christ discovered at the Library Cave

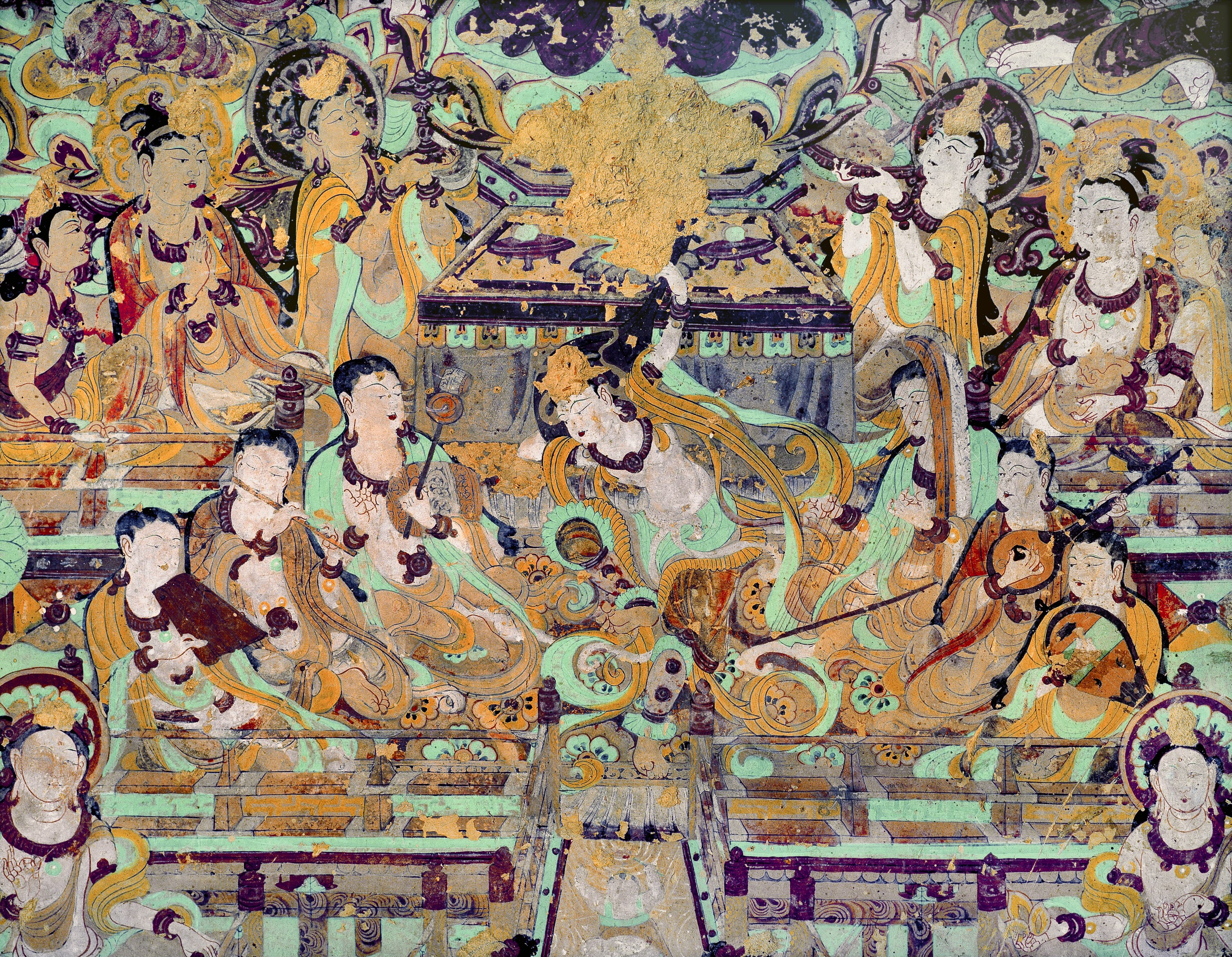
Buddhist cave art, a dancer spins while the orchestra plays. Grotto 46 Left interior wall, second panel. Also called cave 112.

== See also ==
- List of World Heritage Sites in China
- Bezeklik Thousand Buddha Caves
- Bhadrakalpikasutra
- Buddhism in China
- Chinese Manichaean hymn scroll
- Dunhuang Go Manual
- International Dunhuang Project
- Irk Bitig
- Kizil Caves
- Kumtura Thousand Buddha Caves
- Silk Road transmission of Buddhism
- Stele of Sulaiman
- Tang performance arts in Dunhuang
- Tianlongshan Grottoes
