= Middle Binyang Cave =

Buddhist site in Henan, China

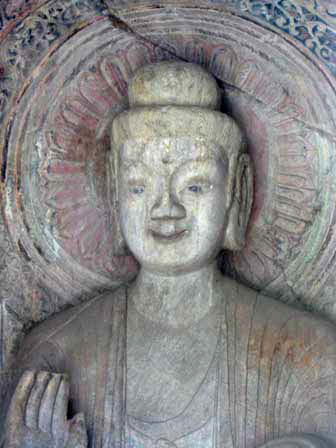
The upper portion of the central Shakyamuni figure (May 2004)

Middle Binyang Cave (simplified Chinese: 宾阳中洞; traditional Chinese: 賓陽中洞; pinyin: Bīnyáng Zhōng Dòng) is cave number 140 at the Longmen Grottoes near Luoyang, Henan, China.

== Dimensions ==
12m long, 10.9m wide, 9.3m high.

== History ==
Constructed by order of Emperor Xuanwu of the Northern Wei in honour of his parents Emperor Xiaowen and Empress Wenzhao, the cave was supposed to imitate Lingyansi Cave at the Yungang Caves. Work began in 500 and was completed in 553. In 1987 a brick-entrance was demolished to reveal two new figures: a four-headed, four-armed Brahma and a one headed, four armed Śakra devendra.

== Features ==
The back wall is a carved Sakyamuni, with two disciples and two bodhisattvas. The main Buddha and bodhisattvas are representative of the Northern Wei sculptural style. A lotus-flower pool decorates the floor. The ceiling is engraved with a blossoming lotus flower, 8 musical apsarases, 2 attending apsarases and tassel and drapery patterns. The front wall is covered with a large Vimalakirti relief, the Prince Sattva jataka, the Prince Sudatta jataka, an emperor/empress worshipping scene and ten deity kings.

== Nearby caves ==
The cave is flanked by North and South Binyang Caves.

== Images ==
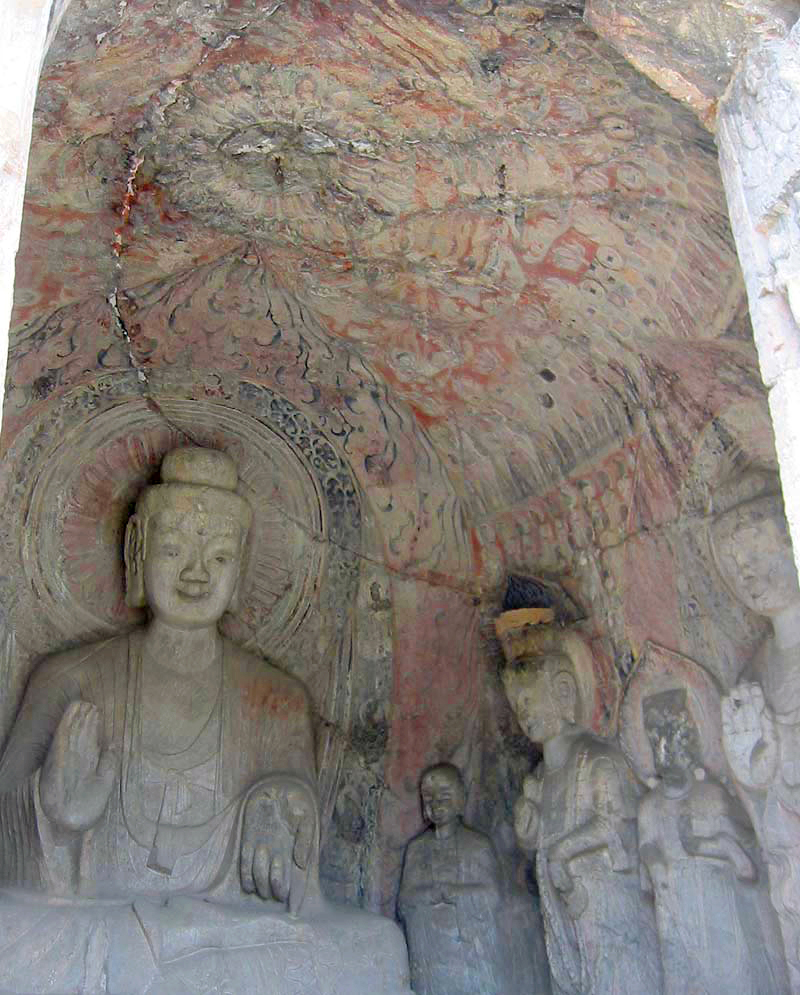
Rear and north walls (2004)

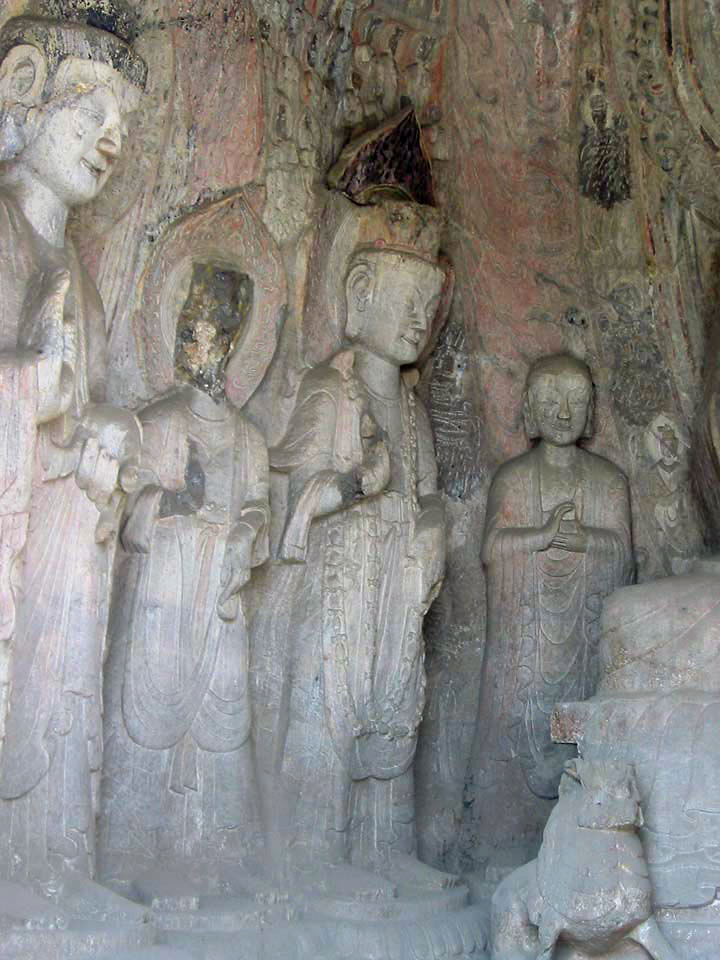
South wall (2004)
