= North Binyang Cave =

Cave in Henan, China

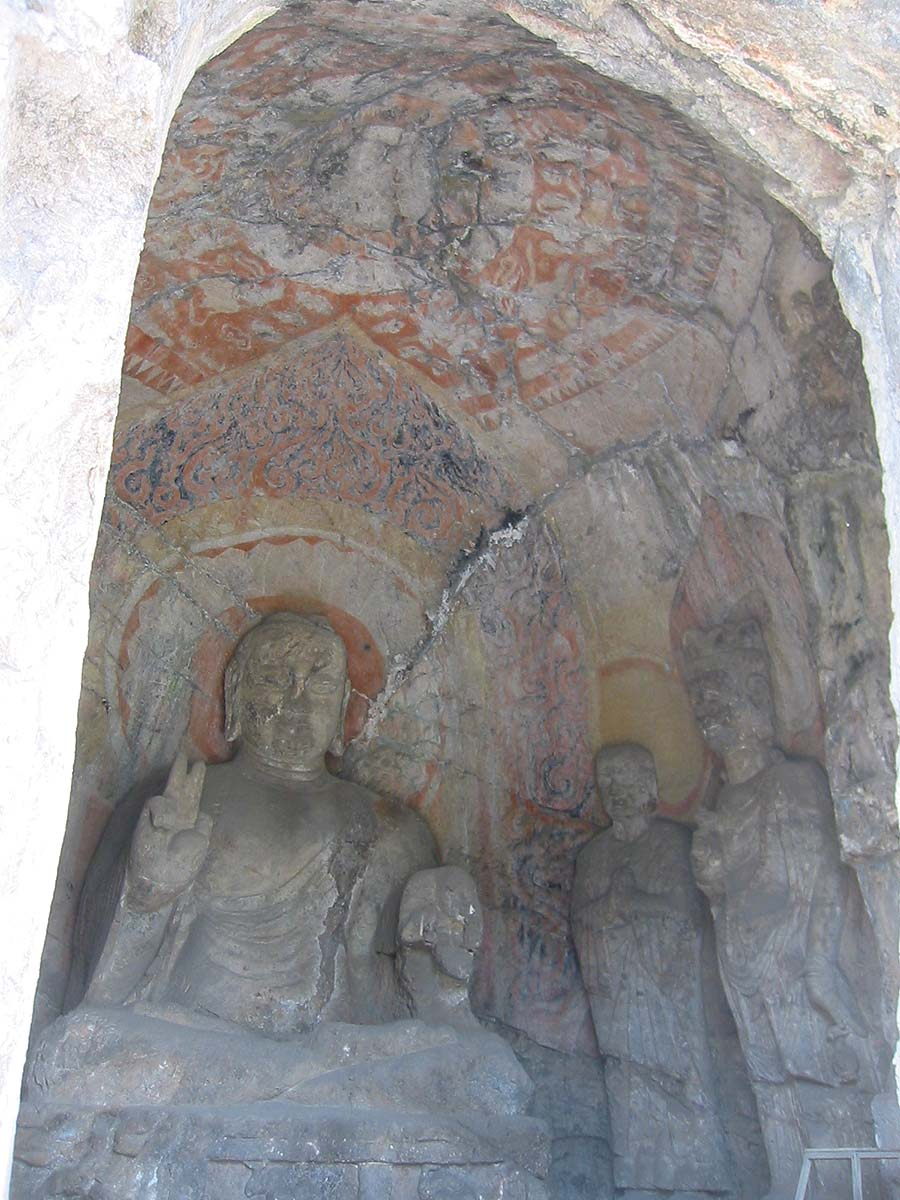
North Binyang Cave interior. The rear and north walls are visible. (May, 2004)

North Binyang Cave (simplified Chinese: 宾阳北洞; traditional Chinese: 賓陽北洞; pinyin: Bīnyáng Běi Dòng) is a cave at the Longmen Grottoes near Luoyang, Henan, China.

== History ==
Teng (腾), who held the office of Zhongyin (中尹), initiated construction of North Binyang Cave during the Northern Wei. Construction began under Emperor Xuanwu, whose reign is known as the Yongping (永平). According to the scholar Dong Wang, between 508 and 511, the North Binyang Cave was constructed. The cave's chapel was mostly built under the Tang dynasty from 650 to 683.

The North Binyang Cave, along with the Middle Binyang Cave and the South Binyang Cave, were first known as Lingyan Temple (灵岩寺). After the Ming and Qing dynasties, the three caves became collectively known as Binyang Cave (宾阳洞). The Chinese phrase binyang (宾阳) literally means "welcome the sun".

== Features ==
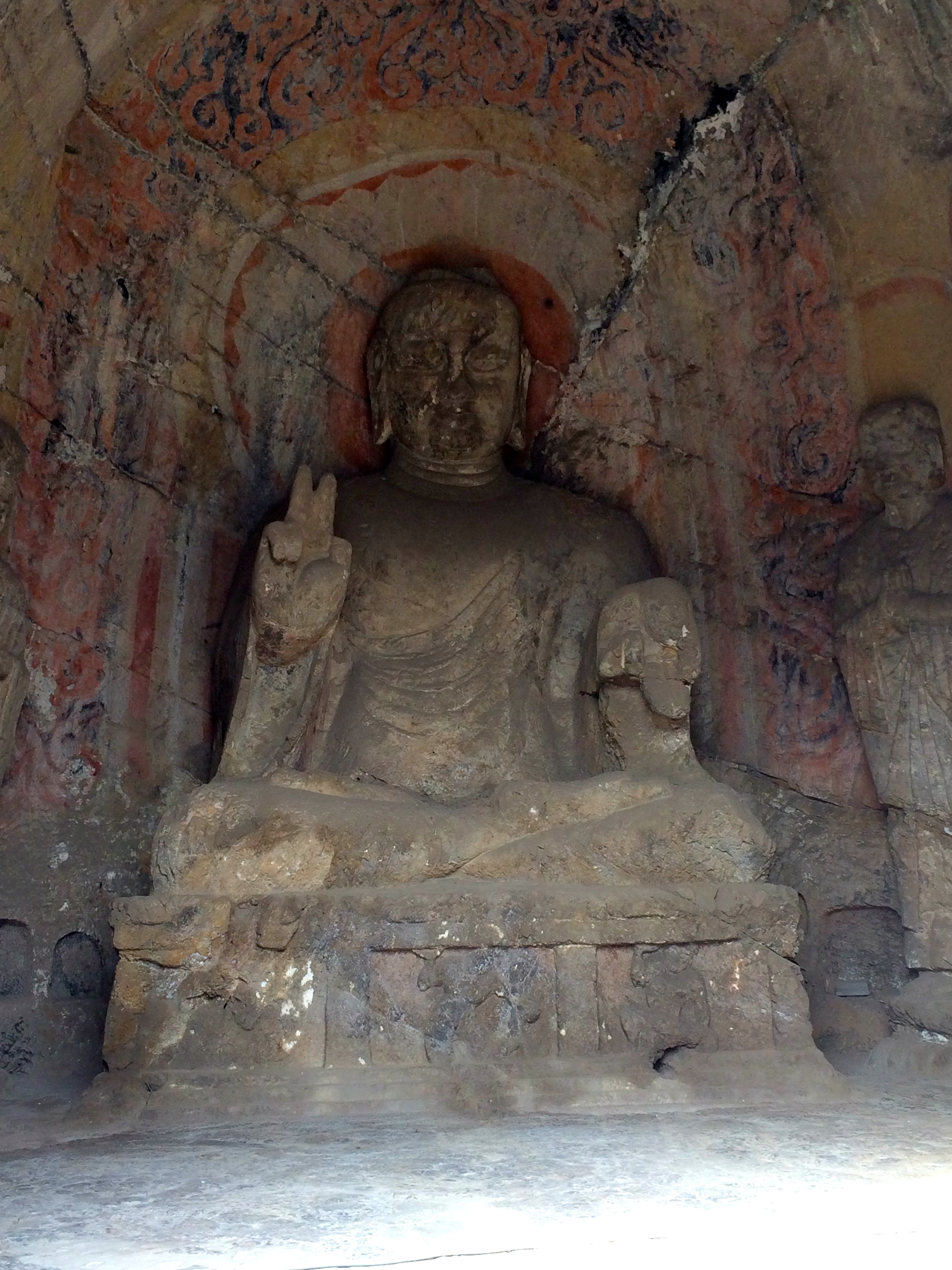
The Amitābha at the North Binyang Cave rear wall in 2015

The cave has a depth of 12.6 m (41 ft), a width of 10 m (33 ft), and a height of 10 m (33 ft). While the Northern Wei created the cave, it features Tang-period sculptures from around 640–650. The cave has three relics from the Northern Wei era. The ceiling features a caisson, a recessed ceiling with a lotus symbol and ten airborne apsaras. Carved on the base of the north wall are five king deities. Carved on the base of the south wall are five kings, two of which have been ruined. There is a partial Northern Wei inscription at the bottom of the cave's northern entryway. Measuring 14 cm (5.5 in) wide and 9 cm (3.5 in) high, it says, "长从人苏......贵令胡............等于此敬( ? ) ......苏玄德".

The cave's north and south walls have eight sculpted niches. Their construction dates to 650–668, spanning the Yonghui and Qianfeng eras of the Tang dynasty. On the north side of the corridor leading to the cave is a standing Buddha statue. Roughly 2 metres (6.6 ft) tall, it is heavily weathered, dating roughly to the rule of Emperor Zhongzong of Tang and Emperor Xuanzong of Tang. The cave's primary wall has a huge statue and reliefs featuring the Four Heavenly Kings. They likely were created around the same era.

The rear of the cave has a seated Buddha, Amitābha, that is 7.55 m (24.8 ft). Scholars consider it to be the cave's primary statue. Two arhats and two bodhisattvas stand on either side of the statue. The Buddha is seated in the lotus posture. Drawn above his right hand are five lines: apsaras (heaven), a running horse (beast), a crouching ghost (evil spirit), a person whose hands are clasped (human), and hell. This design indicates it is a "Five-Path Wheel-Turning King" (五道转轮王), which is also known as the Vairocana Buddha figure (卢舍那人中像) and is seldom seen in the Central Plains area of China. The Buddha's hands are extended, reaching toward the sky and earth. In 2014, numerous tourists enjoyed how the Buddha made a V-shaped (剪刀) hand gesture so spend noticeably more time there. The tourists either took photos or copied the figure's V-shaped sign.

== Images ==
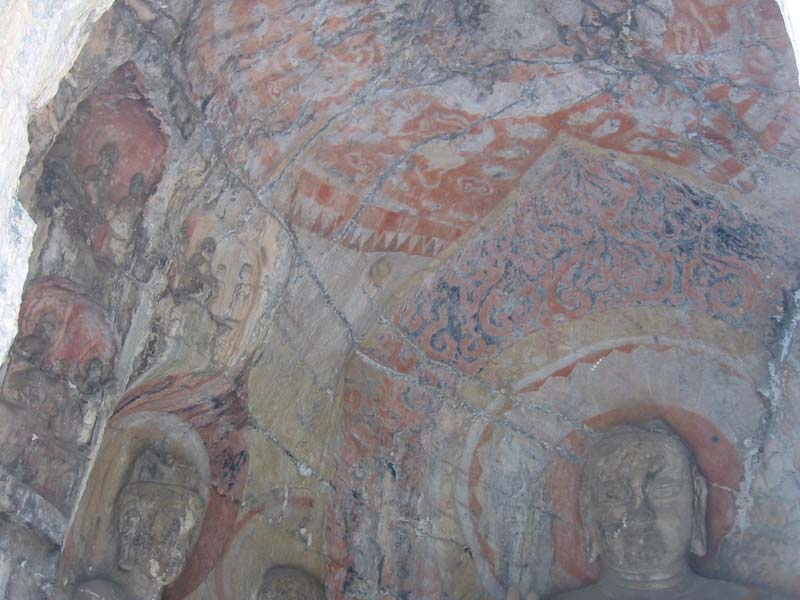
Detail of roof adjoining southern wall (2004)

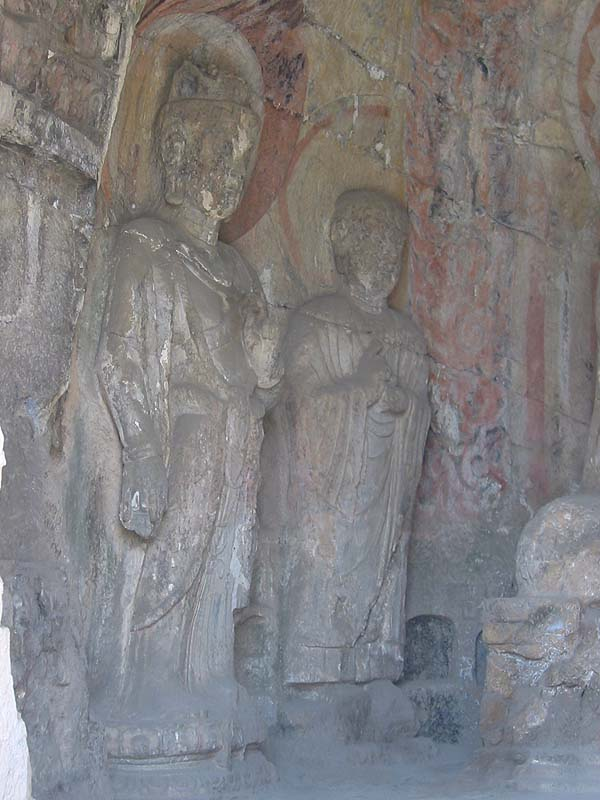
The south wall showing standing figures (2004)
