= South Binyang Cave =

Cave in the Longmen Grottoes, China

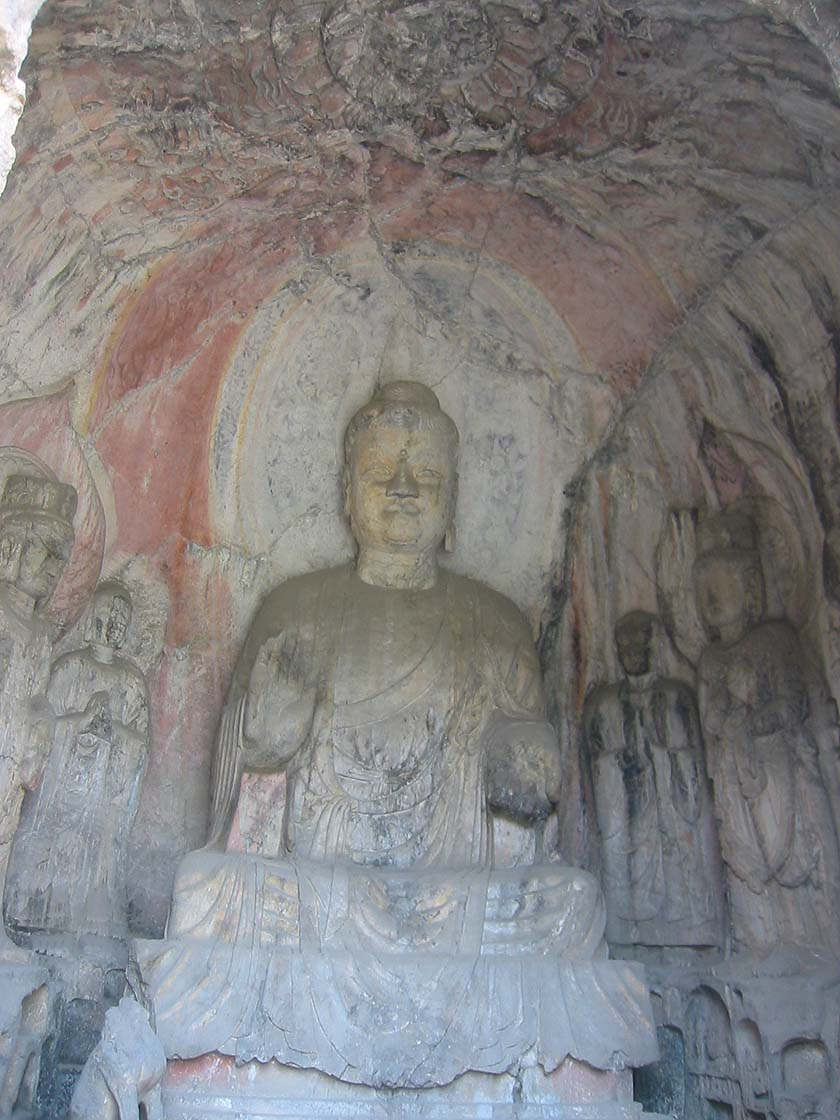
The patterned roof, central and flanking figures (May 2004)

South Binyang Cave (simplified Chinese: 宾阳南洞; traditional Chinese: 賓陽南洞; pinyin: Bīnyáng Nán Dòng) is cave number 159 at the Longmen Grottoes near Luoyang, Henan province, China.

== History ==
Construction began under Emperor Xuanwu, whose reign is known as the Yongping (永平). Work on the cave was initiated in 500 and another round of construction happened between 616 and 673.

The South Binyang Cave, along with the North Binyang Cave and the Middle Binyang Cave, were first known as Lingyan Temple (灵岩寺). After the Ming and Qing dynasties, the three caves became collectively known as Binyang Cave (宾阳洞).

== Features ==
The cave has a depth of 11.8 m (39 ft), a width of 8.70 m (28.5 ft), and a height of 9.80 m (32.2 ft). The main image is an Amitabha which is said to represent the transition of solemn and majestic Northern Wei sculpture in to the more lifelike style of the Tang. There are multiple inscriptions in the cave, and additional figures are also present (possibly bodhisattvas).

According to the scholar Wu Xuede, there is dispute about when the Amitābha and other statues were made. It is variously attributed to the Sui dynasty or to the 15th year of the Tang dynasty's Zhenguan era. In the latter theory, Li Tai, the Prince of Wei, made them using the original statues as reference.

== Images ==
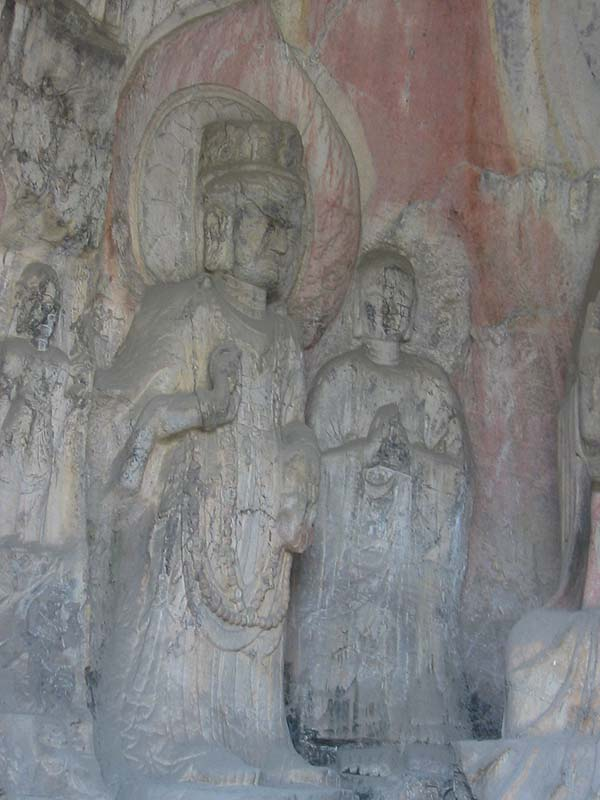
South wall with Bodhisattva and additional figure (2004)

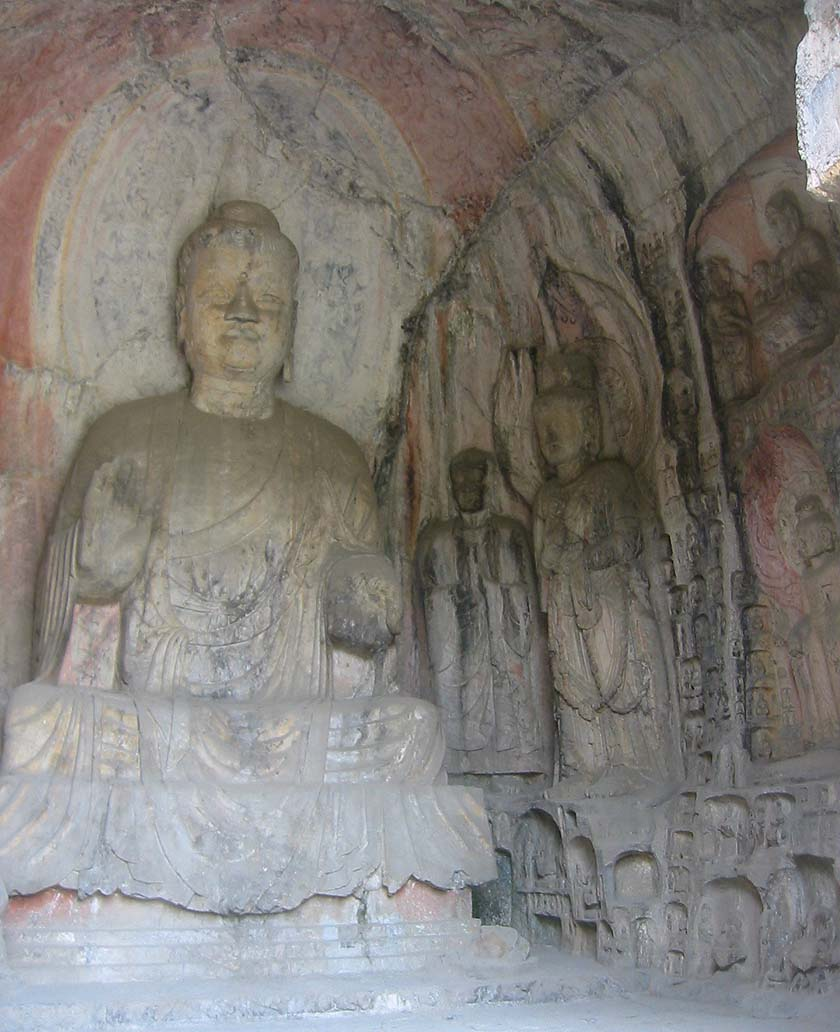
Rear and north walls (2004)
