= Yungang Grottoes =

Buddhist temple grottoes in Shanxi, China

UNESCO World Heritage Site
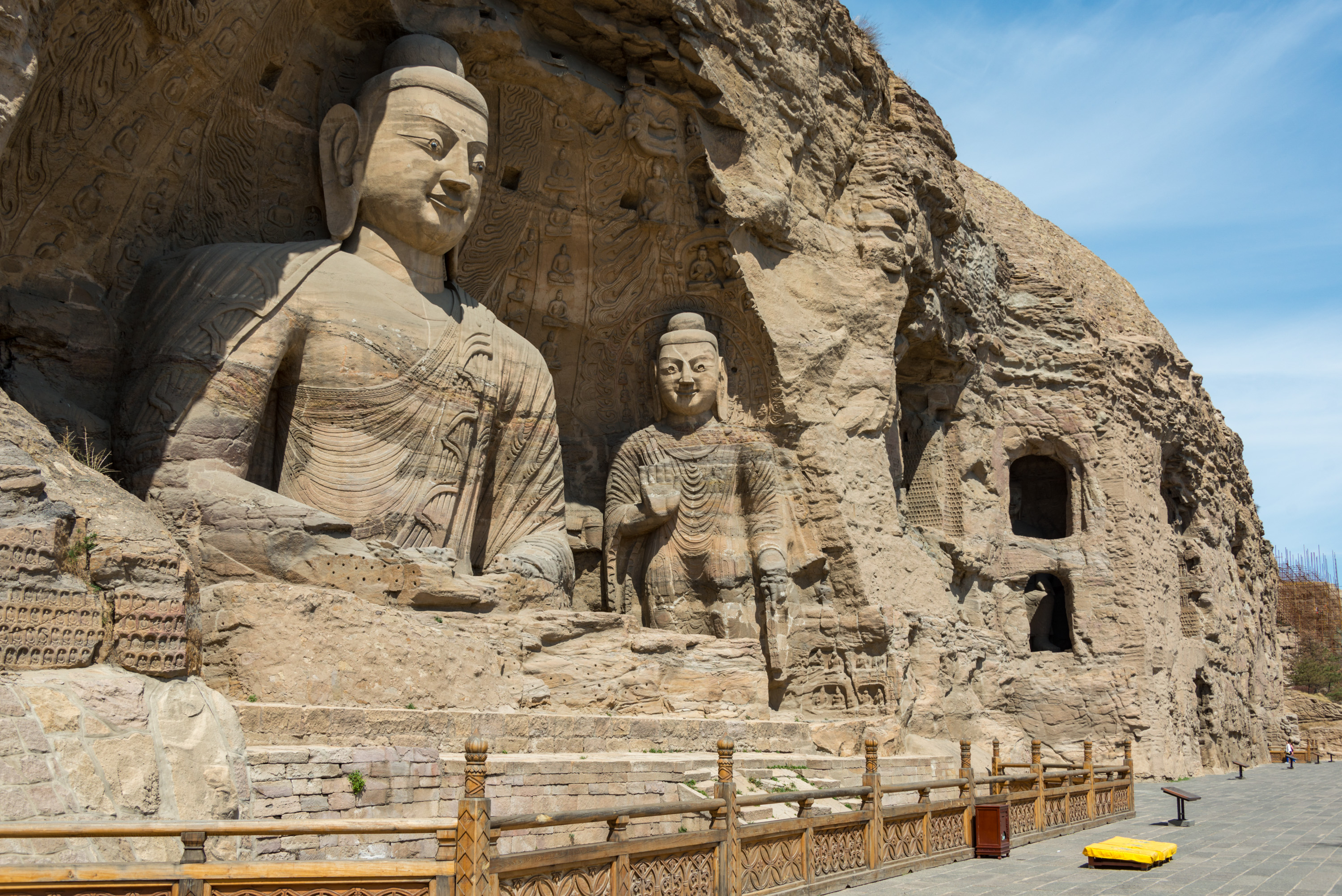
- Yungang Grottoes, Datong, China

- Location within China
- Location: Shanxi, China
- Criteria: Cultural: i, ii, iii, iv
- Reference: 1039
- Inscription: 2001 (25th Session)
- Area: 348.75 ha (861.8 acres)
- Buffer zone: 846.81 ha (2,092.5 acres)
- Coordinates: 40°06′38″N 113°07′33″E

Yungang Grottoes
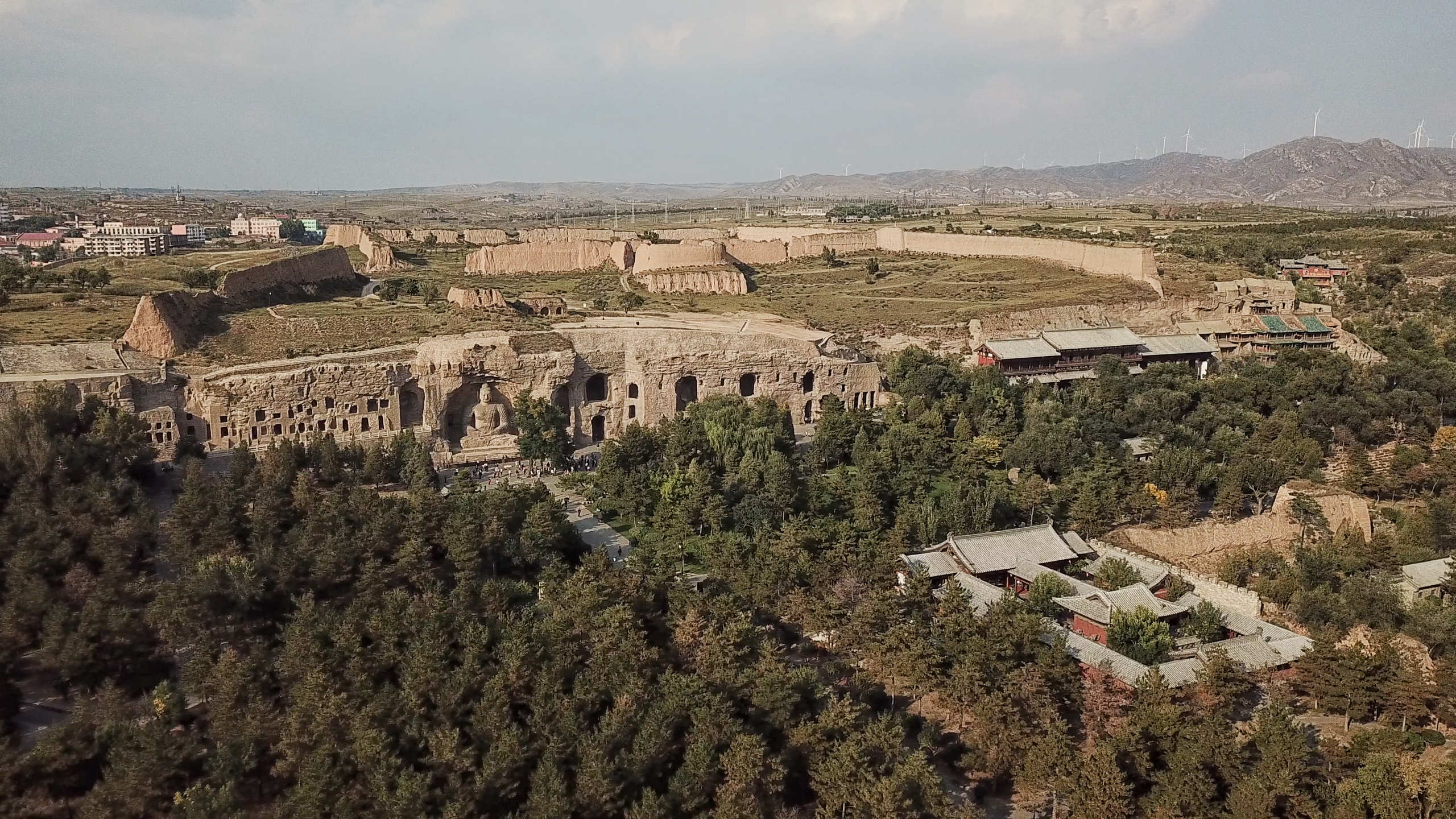
- The panorama of Yungang Grottoes
- Traditional Chinese: 雲崗石窟
- Simplified Chinese: 云冈石窟
Transcriptions
Standard Mandarin
- Hanyu Pinyin: Yúngāng Shíkū
- Wade–Giles: Yün-kang Shih-k‘u

The Yungang Grottoes (simplified Chinese: 云冈石窟; traditional Chinese: 雲岡石窟; pinyin: Yúngāng shíkū), formerly the Wuzhoushan Grottoes (Chinese: 武州山 / 武周山; pinyin: Wǔzhōushān), are ancient Chinese Buddhist temple grottoes built during the Northern Wei dynasty near the city of Datong, then called Pingcheng, in the province of Shanxi. They are excellent examples of rock-cut architecture and one of the three most famous ancient Buddhist sculptural sites of China, along with Longmen and Mogao.

The site is located about 16 km west of the city of Datong, in the valley of the Shi Li river at the base of the Wuzhou Shan mountains. The grottoes were excavated in the south face of a sandstone cliff about 2,600 feet long and 30 to 60 feet high. They are an outstanding example of Chinese stone carvings from the 5th and 6th centuries CE. There are 53 major caves, along with 51,000 niches housing the same number of Buddha statues. Additionally, there are around 1,100 minor caves. A Ming dynasty-era fort is still located on top of the cliff.

In 2001, the Yungang Grottoes were made a UNESCO World Heritage Site. They are considered by UNESCO to be a "masterpiece of early Chinese Buddhist cave art... [and] ...represent the successful fusion of Buddhist religious symbolic art from south and central Asia with Chinese cultural traditions, starting in the 5th century CE under Imperial auspices." The Grottoes are classified as a AAAAA scenic area by the China National Tourism Administration.

== History ==
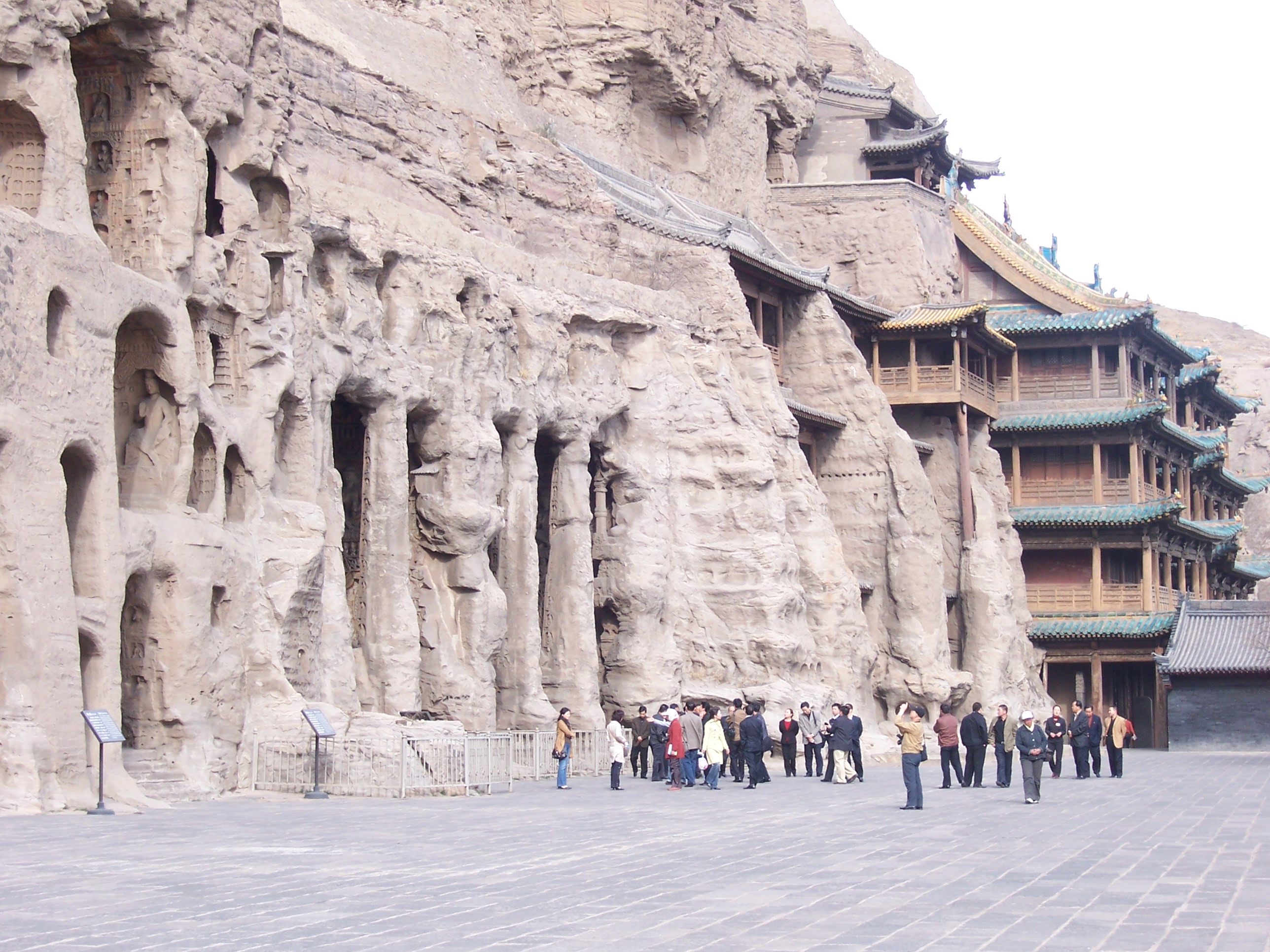
Cave 9

After the decline of the Western Jin dynasty, the northern parts of China came under the control of the Tuoba-ruled Northern Wei. They made the city of Pingcheng (平城), now known as Datong (大同), their capital. Due to its promotion, Pingcheng saw an increase in construction work. The Northern Wei early adopted Buddhism as their state religion. Buddhism arrived in this location via travel on the ancient North Silk Road, the northernmost route of about 2600 kilometres in length, which connected the ancient Chinese capital of Chang'an to the west over the Wushao Ling Pass to Wuwei and emerging in Kashgar before linking to ancient Parthia.

The work during this first period of carving lasted until the year 465 AD, and these caves are now known as caves 16–20. Beginning around the year 471 AD, in a second construction phase that lasted until 494 AD, the twin caves 5/6, 7/8, and 9/10 as well as caves 11, 12, and probably 13 were constructed under the supervision and support of the imperial court. The imperial patronage ended 494 AD with the move of the Wei court to the new capital of Luoyang. All other caves emerged under private patronage in a third construction period, lasting until 525, when the construction came to a final halt due to uprisings in the area.

=== Deterioration and conservation ===
Since the end of construction, the sandstone of the grottoes has been exposed to heavy weathering. Many grottoes are exposed to the open air and are therefore vulnerable to pollution and deterioration. Windblown dust and air pollution from the industrial city of Datong, and dust from mines and highways near the site, pose a threat to the preservation of the ancient statues. The site is also located near the Gobi Desert, the storms of which can contribute to the statues' decay. The ensuing centuries therefore saw several attempts to preserve the caves and to repair sustained damage. During the Liao dynasty, the caves saw some renewing of statues and, from 1049 to 1060, the buildup of the "10 temples of Yungang", which were meant to protect the main caves. However, the temples were destroyed again in a fire some 60 years later. The wooden buildings extant in front of caves 5 and 6 were constructed in 1621, during the late Ming dynasty. Since the 1950s, cracks in the sandstone have been sealed by grouting, and forestation has been implemented in an effort to reduce the weathering due to sandstorms. During the Cultural Revolution, Red Guards damaged many of the carvings, and bullet marks are still visible to observers. During April and May 1991, Caltech personnel conducted air pollutant measurement experiments in the Yungang Grottoes. They found that nearly all of the airborne matter was mineral dust or carbon particles, allowing a focus of attention on sources of these kinds of matter.

== Cave 6 ==
Cave 6 is one of the richest of the Yungang sites. It was constructed between 465 and 494 C.E. by Emperor Xiao Wen. The cave's surface area is approximately 1,000 square meters. The entire interior of the cave is carved and painted. A stupa pillar in the center of the room extends from the floor to the ceiling. The walls are divided into two stories. The walls of the upper stories are host to carvings of standing Buddhas, Bodhisattvas, and monks, among other celestial figures. All of the carvings were painted, but because the caves have been repainted as many as twelve times, determining the original scheme is difficult.

== Gallery ==
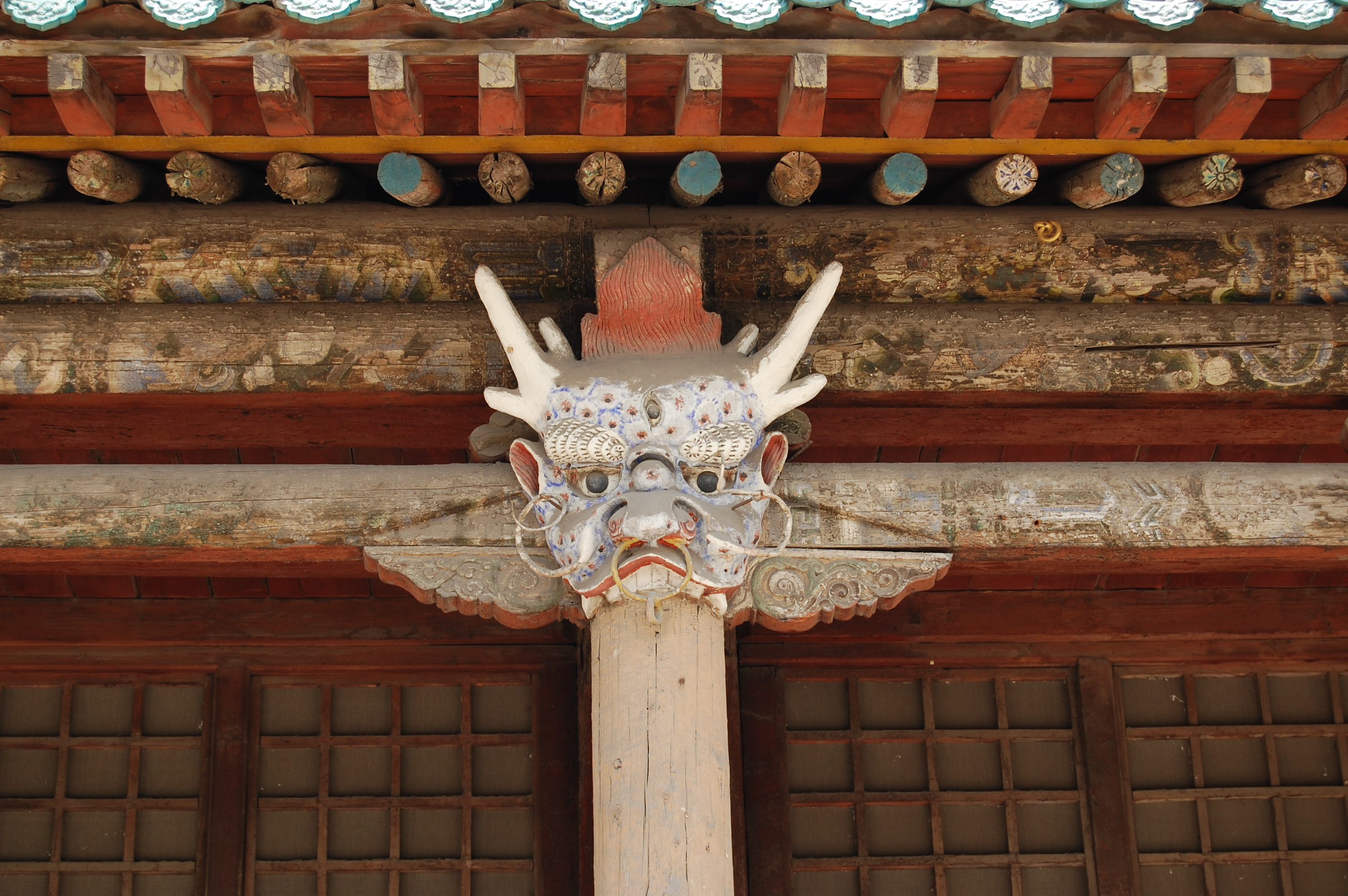
Top of column (dougong) in the building protecting the caves of Yungang Grottoes

Yungang Grotto Buddha

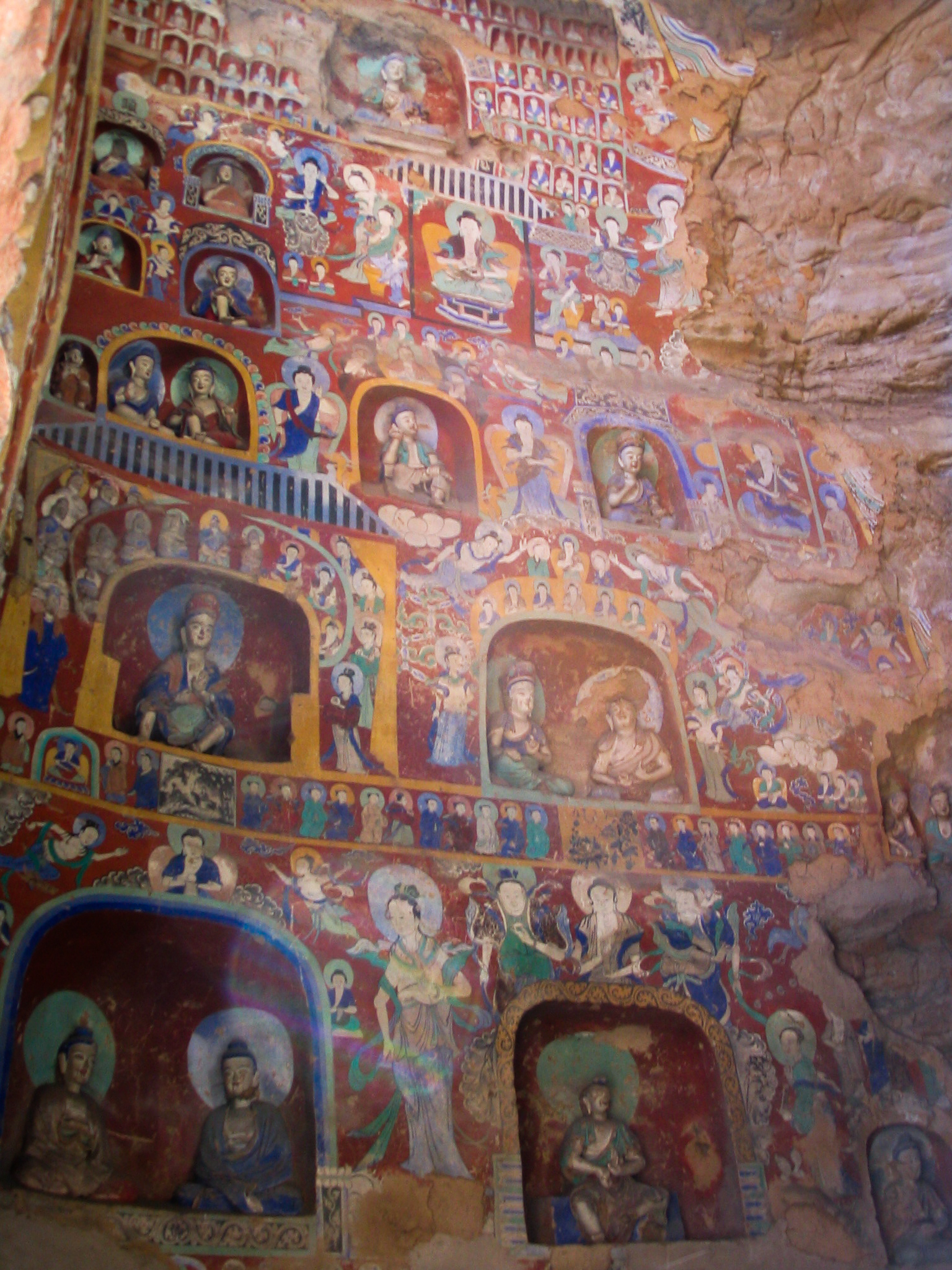
Buddhist paintings in the Yungang Grottoes

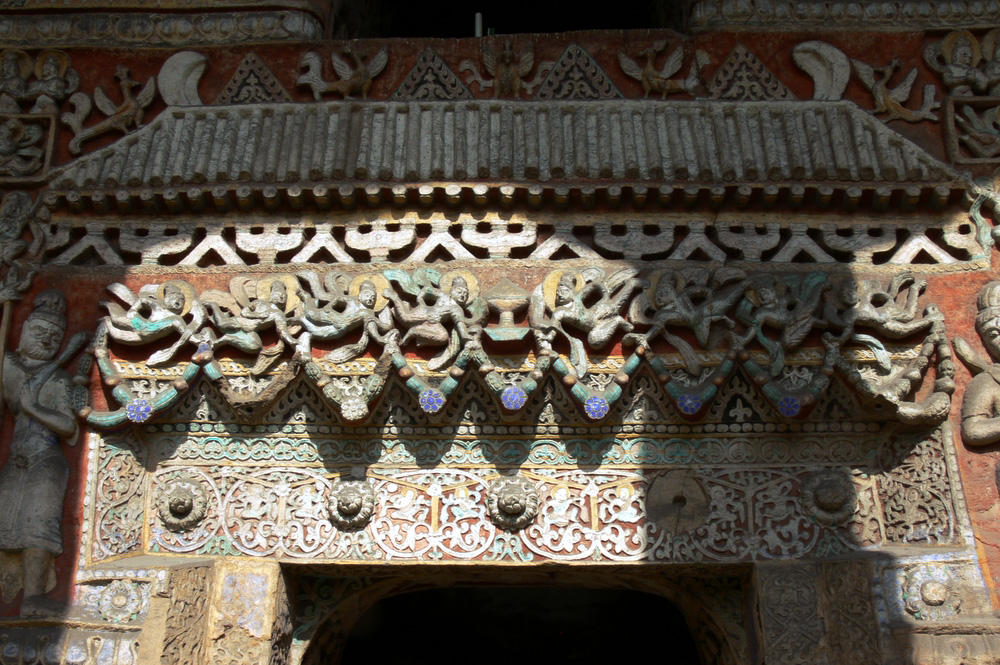
Carved stone dougong inside Cave 9

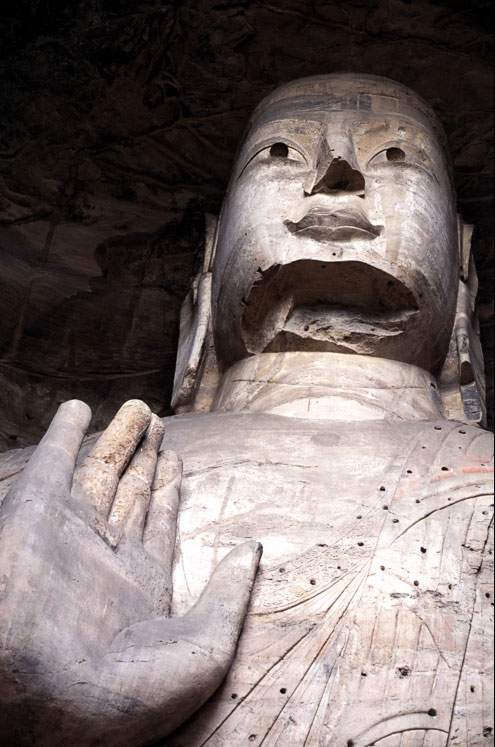
One of the larger statues at Yungang

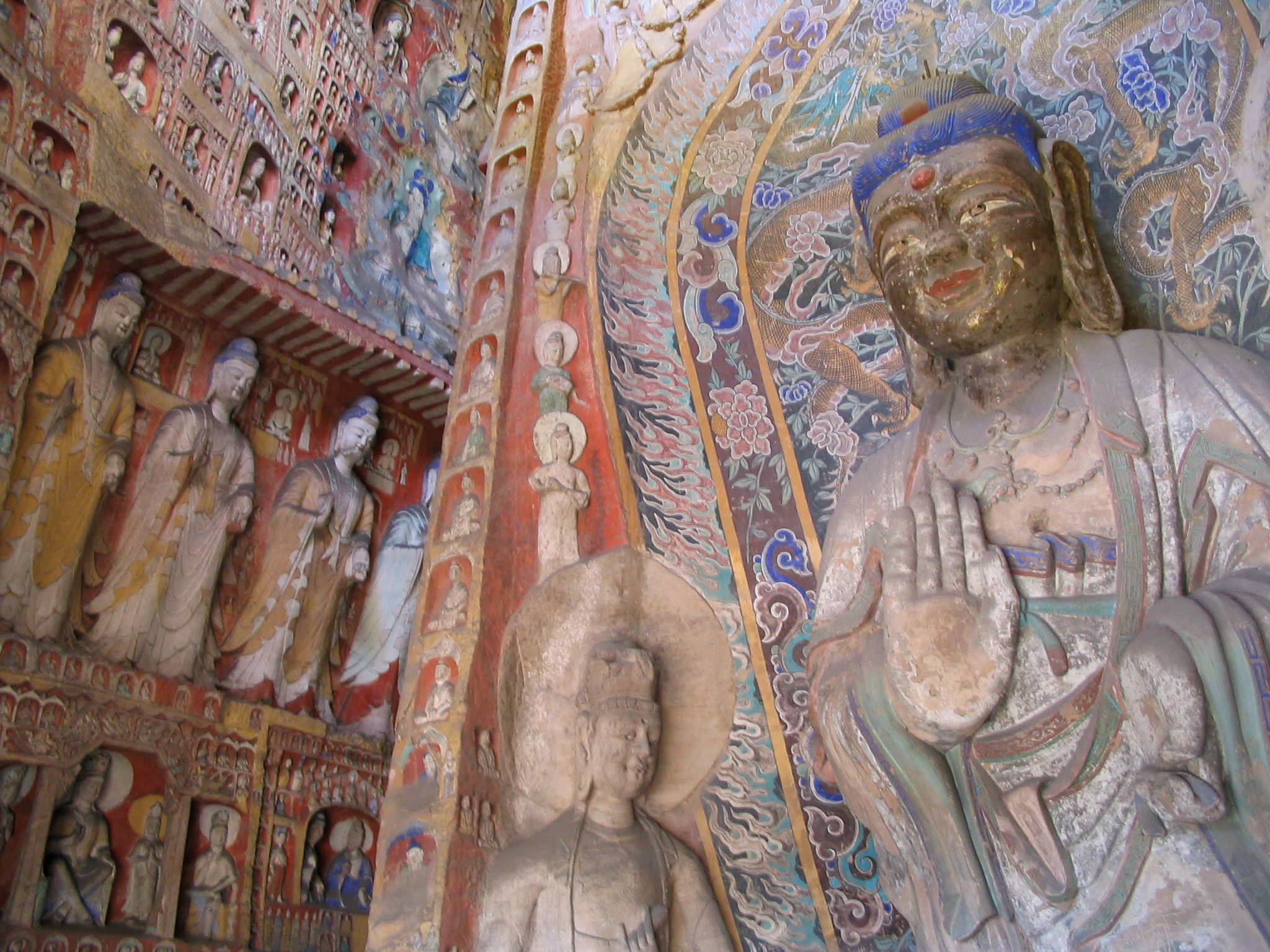

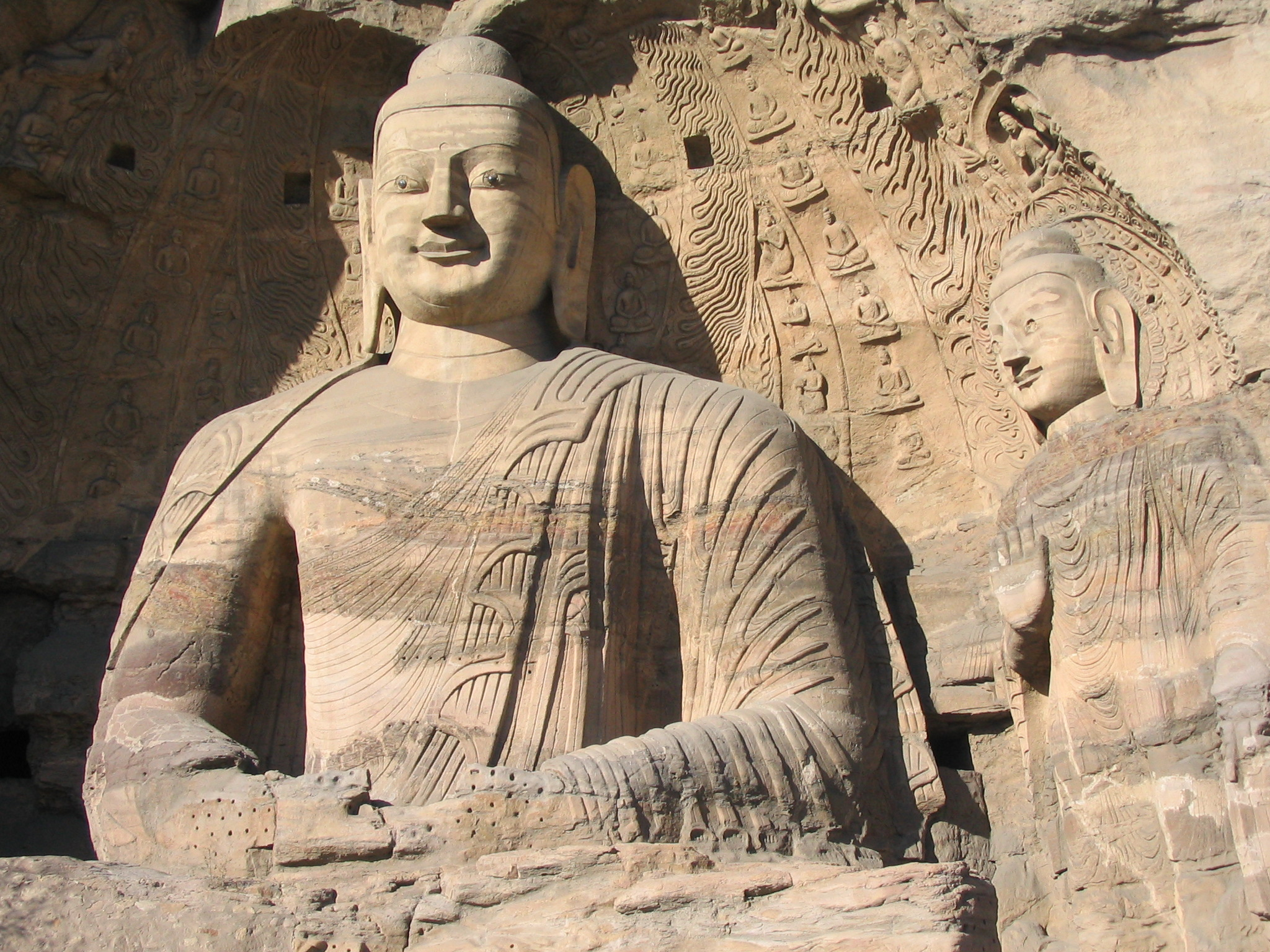

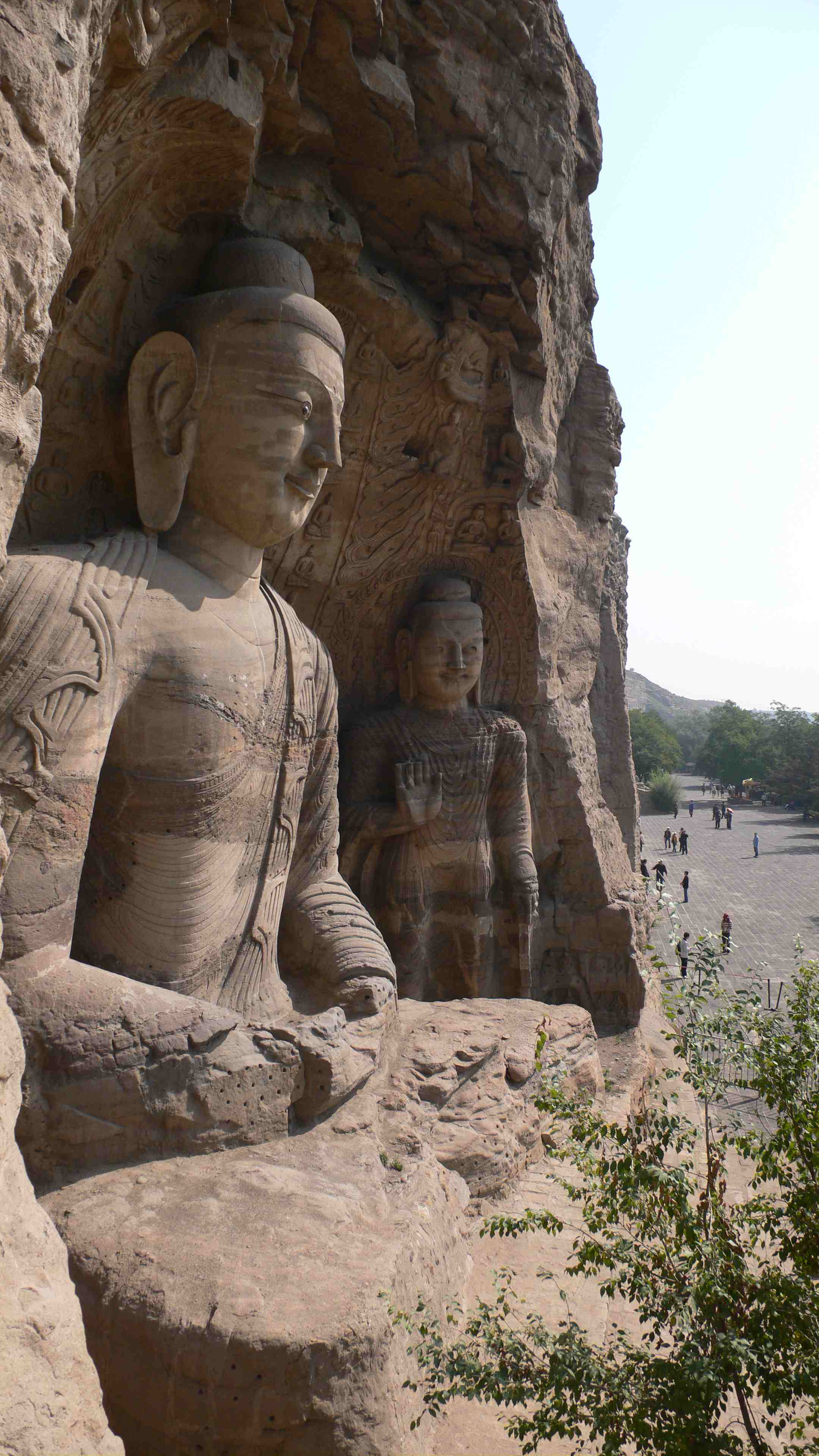
Statue at the Yungang Grottoes

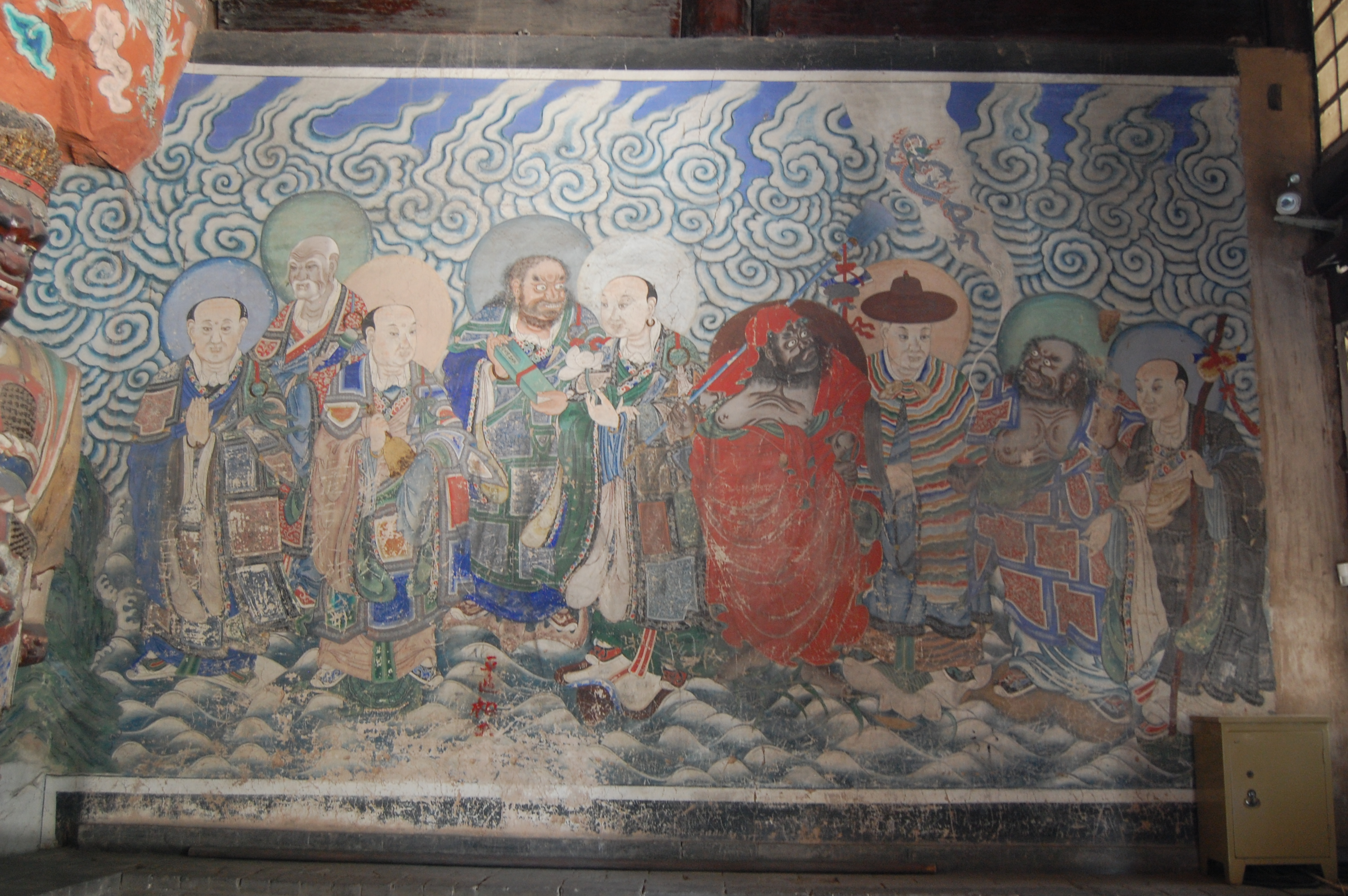

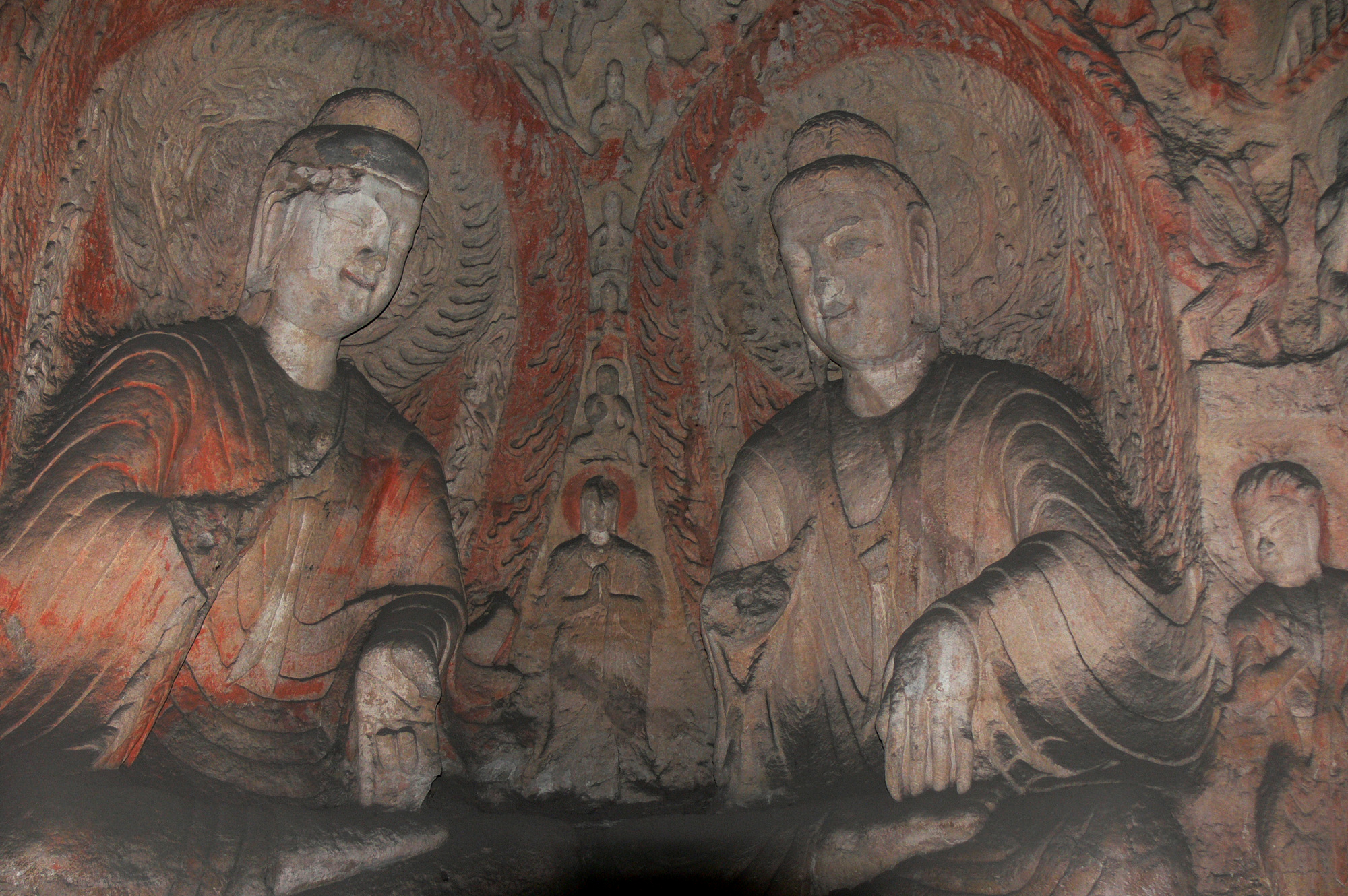

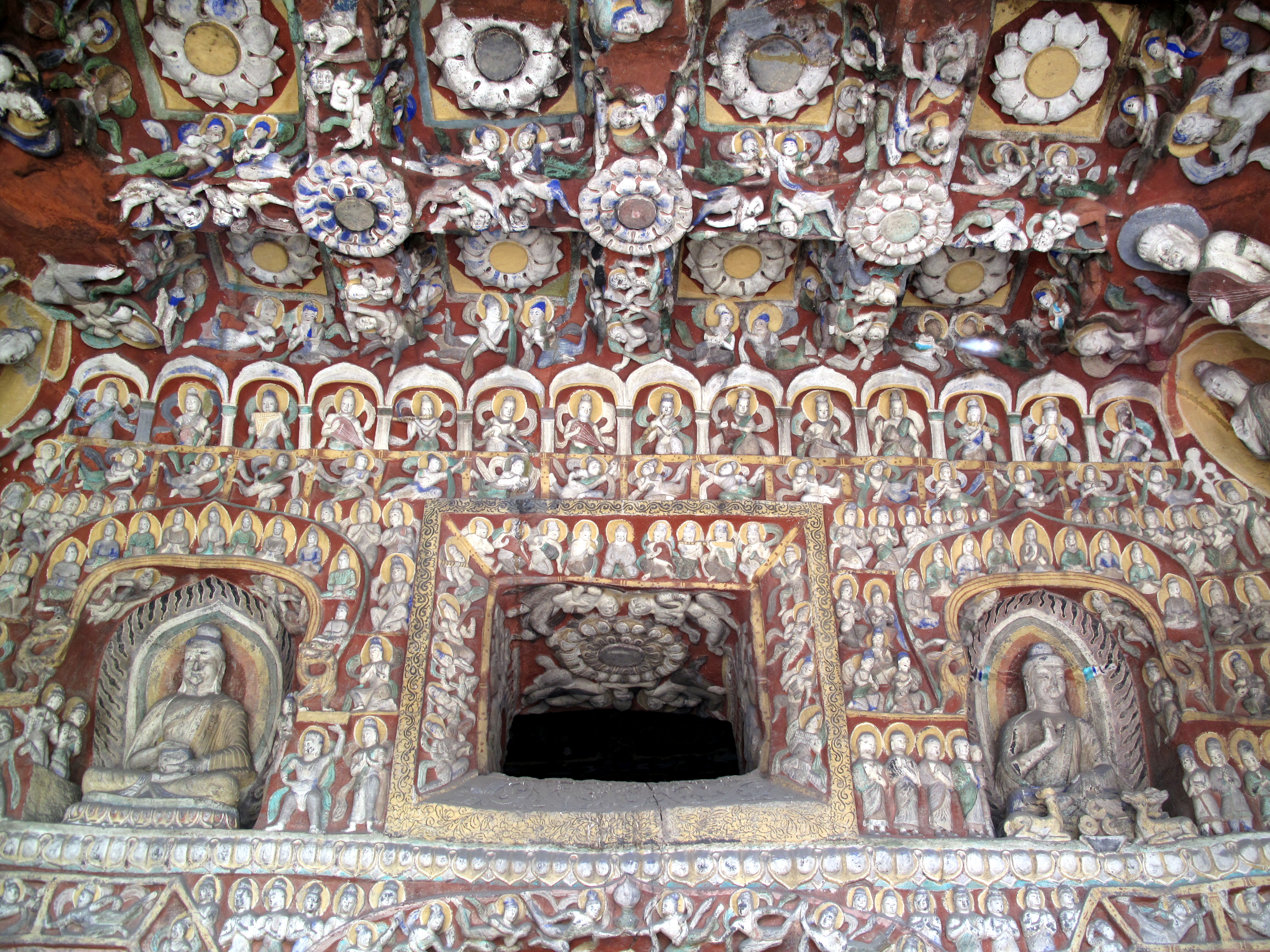
Cave 12. Phase II, after 650 AD. Yungang Grottoes, Datong: a riot of decoration is illustrated here, with Buddhas, musicians, and apsarasas.

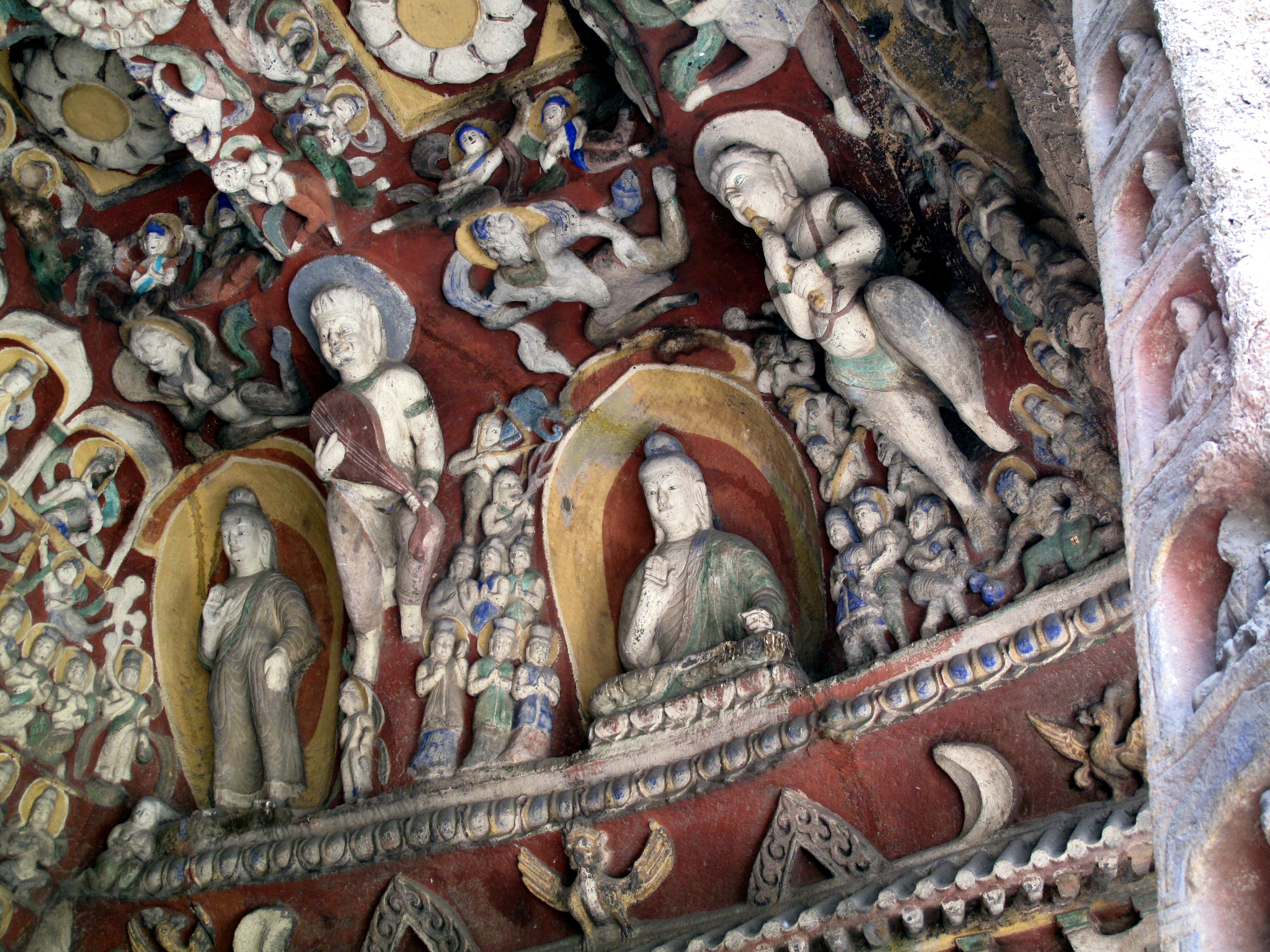
Cave 12. Phase II, after 465 AD. Yungang Grottoes, Datong: musicians playing the pipa and sheng overlook the passing scene.

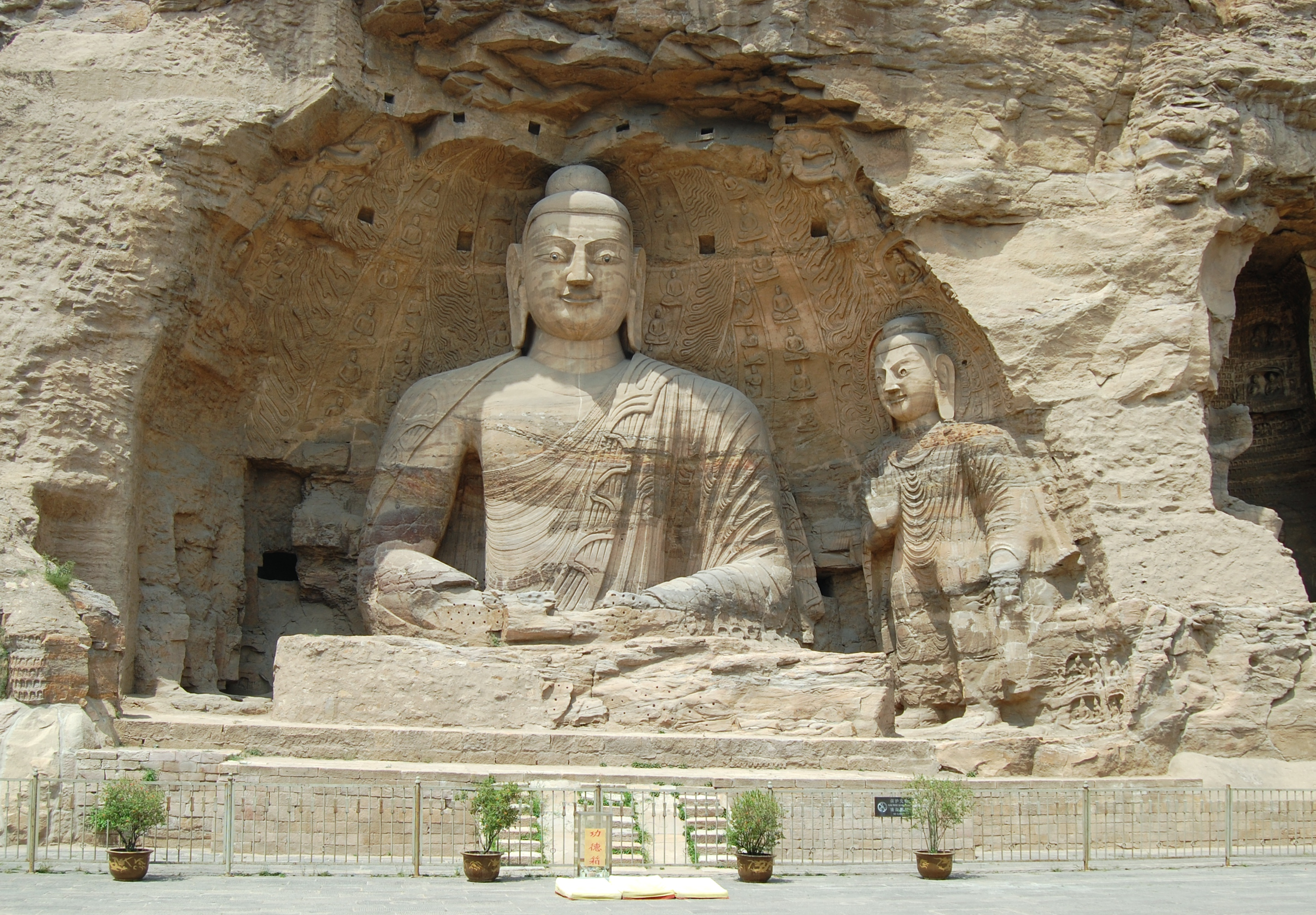
Cave 20

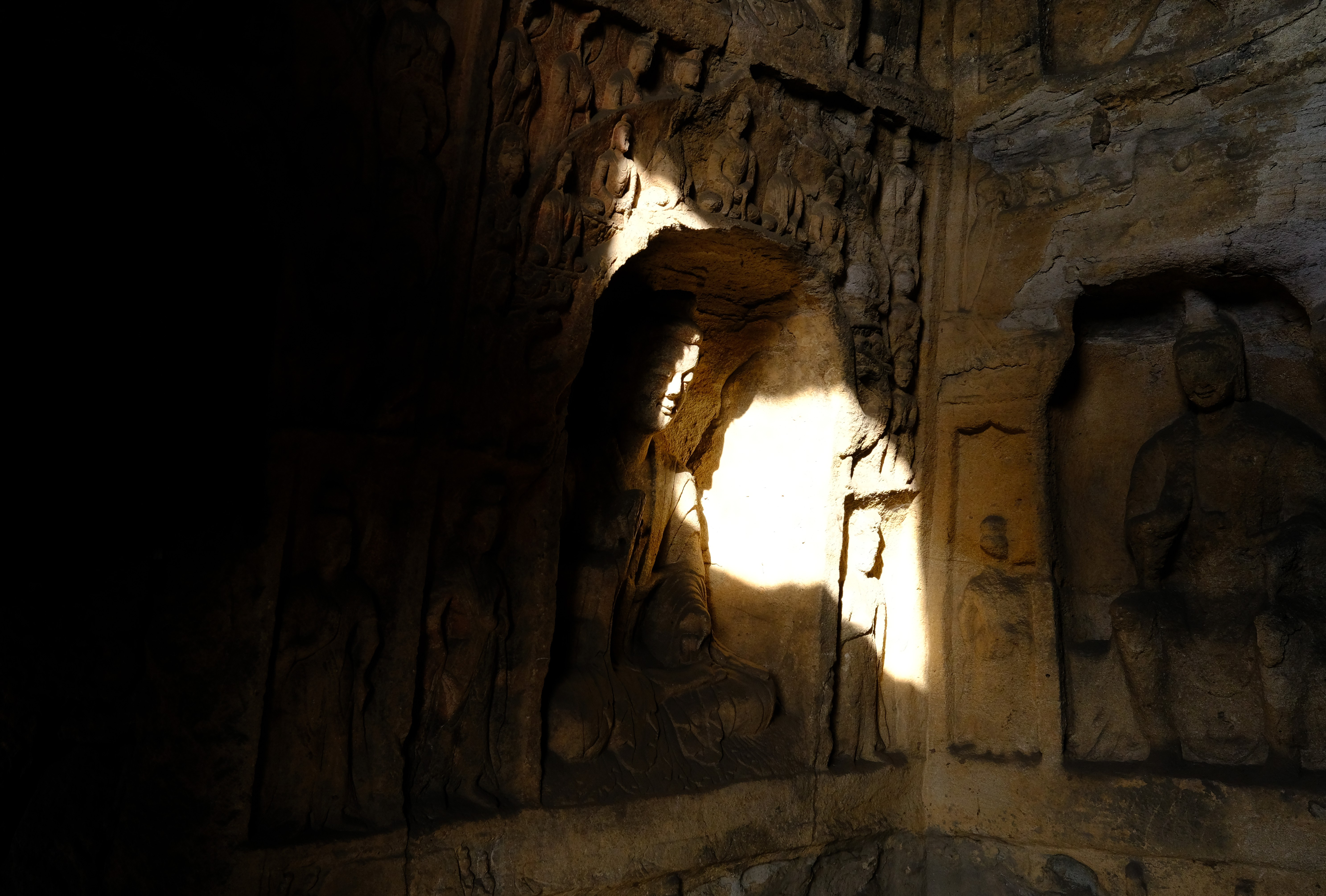
Carving inside Yungang Grottoes

== In popular culture ==
The site was heavily featured, as was the rest of Shanxi province, in the settings visited by the character The Destined One from the globally renowned AAA game Black Myth: Wukong. Tourism greatly increased as the grotto went from the least visited of the major three grottoes from the Northern Wei to its most visited within a few weeks of the game's launch. Shanxi has promoted it very heavily in comparison with the game visuals, as seen in its highly successful 2024 tourism council advertisements.
