= Johann Hoffmann =

Johann Hoffmann may refer to:

- Giovanni Hoffmann (worked c. 1799), Viennese mandolinist, composer, also known as Johann Hoffman
- Johann Hoffmann (bishop) (1375–1451), German theologian, professor, and bishop
- Johann Hoffmann (neurologist) (1857–1919), German neurologist and neuropathologist
- Johann Hoffmann (theatre manager) (1805–1855), Austrian operatic tenor and theatre manager
- Johann Joseph Hoffmann (1805–1878), German scholar of Japanese and Chinese languages
- Johann Wilhelm Hoffmann (1710–1739), German historian, jurist and writer
- Johann Hoffmann (footballer) (1908–1974), Austrian footballer
- Johann Heinrich Hoffmann (1669–1716), German astronomer
- Johann Leonard Hoffmann (1710–1782), Maastricht army surgeon and amateur geologist
- Johann Baptist Hoffmann (1863–1937), German operatic baritone and voice teacher

== See also ==
- Johannes Hoffmann (disambiguation)
