= J. J. L. Duyvendak =

Dutch sinologist (1889–1954)

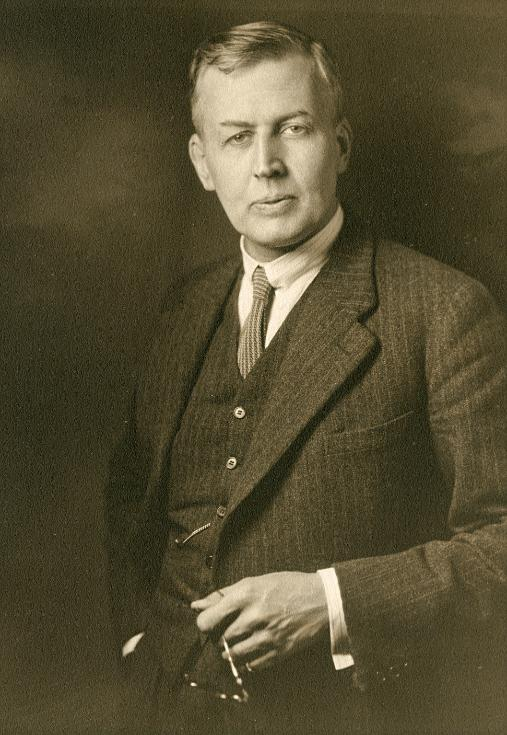
- Duyvendak in the 1940s
- Born: 28 June 1889; Harlingen, Friesland, Netherlands
- Died: 9 July 1954 (aged 65); Leiden, Netherlands
- Scientific career
- Academic advisors: J.J.M. de Groot; Édouard Chavannes; Henri Cordier
- Notable students: A.F.P. Hulsewé

Chinese name
- Traditional Chinese: 戴文達
- Simplified Chinese: 戴文达
Transcriptions
Standard Mandarin
- Hanyu Pinyin: Dài Wéndá
- Wade–Giles: Tai^{4} Wen^{2}-ta^{2}

Jan Julius Lodewijk Duyvendak (28 June 1889 – 9 July 1954) was a Dutch Sinologist and professor of Chinese at Leiden University. He is known for his translation of The Book of Lord Shang and his studies of the Dao De Jing. He was co-editor of the renowned sinology journal T'oung Pao with French scholar Paul Pelliot for several decades.

== Life ==
J. J. L. Duyvendak was born on 28 June 1889 in Harlingen, Netherlands. He matriculated at Leiden University as an undergraduate where he studied philology, and was soon introduced to Chinese by Dutch sinologist J.J.M. de Groot. In 1910 Duyvendak moved to Paris where he began more advanced studies in Chinese under Édouard Chavannes and Henri Cordier. From 1912 to 1918, Duyvendak worked as an interpreter at the Dutch embassy in Beijing before gaining a position at Leiden University in 1919. During World War II, Duyvendak worked to protect Jews living in the Netherlands from Nazi forces.

Duyvendak became a member of the Royal Netherlands Academy of Arts and Sciences in 1931.

In 1942, Duyvendak published one of the first articles in a Western language on the Crab Nebula supernova as observed by Chinese astronomers in 1054 during the Song dynasty.

== Published works ==
- The Book of Lord Shang, Chicago: University of Chicago Press, 1928
- "The True Dates of the Chinese Maritime Expeditions in the Early Fifteenth Century". In: T'oung Pao, 1938
- "Further Data Bearing on the Identification of the Crab Nebula with the Supernova of 1054 AD: Part I, the Ancient Oriental Chronicles", Publications of the Astronomical Society of the Pacific 54, no. 318, 1942, pp. 91–94.
- Tao Te Ching, The Book of the Way and Its Virtue, London: John Murray, 1954

Preceded by Julius Herman Boeke	Rector magnificus of Leiden University; 1952–1953	Succeeded by Jacob Maarten van Bemmelen
