= Johannes Hoffmann =

Johannes Hoffmann may refer to:

- Johannes Hoffmann (CVP politician) (1890–1967), German politician of the CVP party
- Johannes Hoffmann (SPD politician) (1867–1930), German politician of the SPD party
- Johannes Hoffmann (vascular surgeon) (born 1968), German physician
- Johannes Hoffmann von Schweidnitz (1375–1451), Roman Catholic theologian
- Johannes Hoffmann (sculptor) (1844–1920), sculptor

== See also ==
- Johann Hoffmann (disambiguation)
