= Albert Terrien de Lacouperie =

French orientalist (1844–1894)

- Born: Albert Étienne Jean-Baptiste Terrien de Lacouperie; 23 November 1844; Ingouville, Le Havre, Normandy, France
- Died: 11 October 1894 (aged 49); Fulham, London, England
- Scientific career
- Fields: Oriental studies, specialising in philology

Albert Étienne Jean-Baptiste Terrien de Lacouperie (23 November 1844 – 11 October 1894) was a French orientalist, specialising in comparative philology. He published a number of books on early Asian and Middle-Eastern languages, initially in French and then in English. Lacouperie is best known for his studies of the Yi Ching and his argument, known as Sino-Babylonianism, that the important elements of ancient civilization in ancient China came from Mesopotamia and that there were resemblances between Chinese characters and Akkadian hieroglyphics.

The American sinologist E. Bruce Brooks writes that Lacouperie "gained a sufficiently accurate view of the Spring and Autumn period that he realized, half a century before Ch'ien Mu and Owen Lattimore, that the 'Chinese' territory of that period was in fact honeycombed with non-Sinitic peoples and even states." Brooks concluded that the "whole trend of Lacouperie's thought still provokes a collective allergic reaction in Sinology and its neighbor sciences; only now are some of the larger questions he raised, and doubtless mishandled, coming to be hesitantly askable."

== Early life and name ==
Biographical detail on Terrien is scant, some notices drawing on Royal Asiatic Society records and prefaces. He was born in November 1844 in Ingouville, Le Havre, Normandy. He was a descendant of the Cornish family of Terrien, which emigrated in the 17th century during the English Civil War, and acquired the property of La Couperie in Normandy. Some bibliographies append "Baron" to his name and it appears he published under the name Albert Étienne Jean-Baptiste Terrien de Lahaymonnais Peixotte de Poncel, Baron de La Couperie, but there is no record of the family being ennobled. His father was a merchant, and Albert received a business education.

== Career ==
In early life he settled at Hong Kong, where he soon turned his attention from commerce to the study of oriental languages, and he acquired an especially intimate knowledge of the Chinese language. In 1867, he published a philological work, Du Langage, Essai sur la Nature et l'Étude des Mots et des Langues (Paris), which attracted considerable attention. Soon after, his attention was attracted by the progress made in deciphering Babylonian inscriptions, and by the resemblance between the Chinese characters and the early Akkadian language hieroglyphics.

The comparative philology of the two languages occupied most of his later life, and he was able to show an early affinity between them. In 1879, he went to London, was elected a fellow of the Royal Asiatic Society, and began to write works in English. In 1884, he became professor of comparative philology, as applied to the languages of South-Eastern Asia, at University College, London.

In the 1880s, he was also employed on several short-term contracts to work on the East-Asian coin collection at the British Museum. In 1892, he published his Catalogue of Chinese Coins from the VIIth Century BC to AS 621 including the Series in the British Museum, for which the Académie des Inscriptions, France, awarded him the Stanislas Julien Prize, worth 1,500 French francs, "for the best work relating to China".

His last years were largely occupied by a study of the I Ching, or Book of Changes. Its meaning had long proved a puzzle both to native and to foreign scholars. Terrien demonstrated that the basis of the work consisted of fragmentary notes, chiefly lexical in character, and noticed that they bore a close resemblance to the syllabaries of Chaldaea. In 1892, he published the first part of an explanatory treatise The Oldest Book of the Chinese (London), in which he stated his theory of the nature of the I Ching, and gave translations of passages from it. The treatise, however, was not completed before his death.

In recognition of his services to oriental study he received a Doctor of Letters degree from the University of Leuven. He also enjoyed for a time a small pension from the French government, and after that had been withdrawn an unsuccessful attempt was made by his friends to obtain him an equivalent from the English ministry. He was twice awarded the prix Stanislas Julien by the Académie des Inscriptions et Belles-Lettres for his services to oriental philology.

== Death ==
Terrien died in London at his residence, 136 Bishop's Road, Fulham, leaving a widow.

== Evaluations of Lacouperie's theories ==
Lacouperie's translations and Sino-Babylonian theories that the origins of Chinese civilization lay in Mesopotamia impressed the public but were criticised or dismissed by sinologists then and in following years. James Legge, whose translations of the Chinese Classics appeared at the same time as Terrien's and are still considered standard, questioned Terrien's sinological competence. Legge's review of Lacouperie's translation of the I Ching charged that only "hasty ignorance" could have led to the mistakes, which included failing to consult the basic reference, the Kangxi Dictionary. Another reviewer at the time labelled Terrien a "specious wonder-monger." But the final decline of Lacouperie's comparativist theories of the origins of Chinese civilisation was marked by the attacks of University of Leiden sinologist, Gustav Schlegel. Schlegel and following Orientalists insisted on the independent origin and growth of Chinese civilisation. In particular, these scholars pointed out that monosyllabic Chinese characters could not be equated to polysyllabic Chaldean words; that in any case, Assyriological knowledge was "dangerously uncertain" and too unreliable to make such claims; and that it had not even been established that Babylonian civilization was earlier than Chinese.

Lacouperie's theory on the Babylonian origins of the sixty year ganzhi cyclical calendar system has fared little better, as the two systems differed both in concept and function: the Babylonian decimal system was used to count up to 60, where the cycle started again, while the Chinese system combined a cycle of twelve and a cycle of ten.

Lacouperie's ideas received attention from some Chinese intellectuals and nationalists such as Liu Shipei (in his book of expulsion (rangshu 攘書)), Zhang Binglin (in his book, book of raillery (qiushu 訄書)) and Huang Jie (黃節, in his book yellow history (huangshi 黃史)), in support of anti-Manchu racist theories (founded on those of Herbert Spencer and the Yellow Book (huangshu 黃書) by Chinese historian Wang Fuzhi) that were current at the beginning of the 20th century. His theory of a Western origin of Chinese civilization had reached Japan around the same time, the academic refutation did not stop it becoming a prevalent and populist notion.

The idea for a mythical script, native to Formosa, was founded on a formulation of the author, though he also noted the paucity in quality of information from that region.

A more durable contribution to scholarship was Lacouperie's identification of the ancient names of the Indian Brahmi and Kharosthi scripts from research in Chinese sources.

== Works ==
- Du langage: Essai sur la nature et l'étude des mots et des langues, Paris, 1867 (scan)
- Early History of the Chinese Civilisation, London, 1880, 8vo (scan).
- On the History of the Archaic Chinese Writings and Text, London, 1882, 8vo.
- Paper Money of the Ninth Century and supposed Leather Coinage of China, London, 1882, 8vo (scan).
- On a Lolo MS. written on Satin, London, 1882, in The Journal of the Royal Asiatic Society of Great Britain and Ireland, New Series 14 (scan)
- The Old Numerals, the Counting-Rods and the Swan-pan in China, London, 1883 (scan).
- The Cradle of the Shan Race, London, 1885, 8vo (scan).
- Babylonia and China, London, 1887, 4to.; first in Babylonian and Oriental Record 1.8 (scan).
- Did Cyrus introduce Writing into India? London, 1887, 8vo (scan).
- The Miryeks or Stone-Men of Corea, Hertford, 1887, 8vo (scan).
- The Yueh-Ti and the early Buddhist Missionaries in China, 1887, 8vo; first in The Academy 32 (scan).
- Formosa Notes on MSS., Races and Languages, 1887, 8vo; first in The Journal of the Royal Asiatic Society of Great Britain and Ireland, New Series 19 (scan).
- The Languages of China before the Chinese, London, 1887, 8vo (scan); French edition, Paris, 1888, 8vo (scan).
- The Fabulous Fishmen of Early Babylonia in Ancient Chinese Legends, London, 1888 (scan); first in Babylonian and Oriental Record 2.10 (scan).
- Khan, Khakan, and Other Tartar Titles, London, 1888 (scan).
- The Old Babylonian Characters and their Chinese Derivates, London, 1888, 8vo (scan).
- The Djurtchen of Mandshuria: Their Name, Language, and Literature, 1889, 8vo; first in The Journal of the Royal Asiatic Society of Great Britain and Ireland, New Series 21 (scan).
- Le Non-Monosyllabisme du Chinois Antique, Paris, 1889, 8vo; first in Le Muséon 8 (scan).
- The Onomastic Similarity of Nai Hwang-ti of China and Nakhunte of Susiana, London, 1890, 8vo; first in The Babylonian and Oriental Record 4.11 (scan).
- Une monnaie bactro-chinoise bilingue du premier siècle avant notre ère, Paris, 1890 (scan)
- L'ère des Arsacides en 248 avant J.-C. selon les inscriptions cunéiformes, Louvain, 1891, 8vo; first in Le Muséon 10 (scan).
- The Silk Goddess of China and her Legend, London, 1891, 8vo; first in The Babylonian and Oriental Record 4.12 (1890; scan), 5.1 (1891; scan).
- How in 219 B.C. Buddhism entered China, London, 1891, 8vo; first in The Babylonian and Oriental Record 5.5 (scan).
- Mélanges: on the Ancient History of Glass and Coal and the Legend of Nü-Kwa's Coloured Stones in China [1891?], 8vo.
- Sur deux Ères inconnus de l'Asie Antérieure, 330 et 251 B.C., 1891, 8vo.
- The Oldest Book of the Chinese, the Yh-King, and Its Authors, Vol. I. History and Method, London, 1892 (scan)
- Catalogue of Chinese Coins from the VIIth Cent. B.C. to A.D. 621, ed. R. S. Poole, London, 1892, 8vo.
- Beginnings of Writing in Central and Eastern Asia, London, 1894, 8vo (scan).
- Western Origin of the Early Chinese Civilisation from 2,300 B.C. To 200 A.D. Or: Chapters on the Elements Derived from the Old Civilisations of West Asia in the Formation of the Ancient Chinese Culture, London, 1894 (scan).

Many of these treatises were reprinted from the Journal of the Royal Asiatic Society and other publications. He also edited the Babylonian and Oriental Record from 1886.

== See also ==
- List of French people
- List of sinologists
- List of University College London people
- Wonderism
