= Sino-Babylonianism =

Discredited theory about the origin of the Chinese civilization

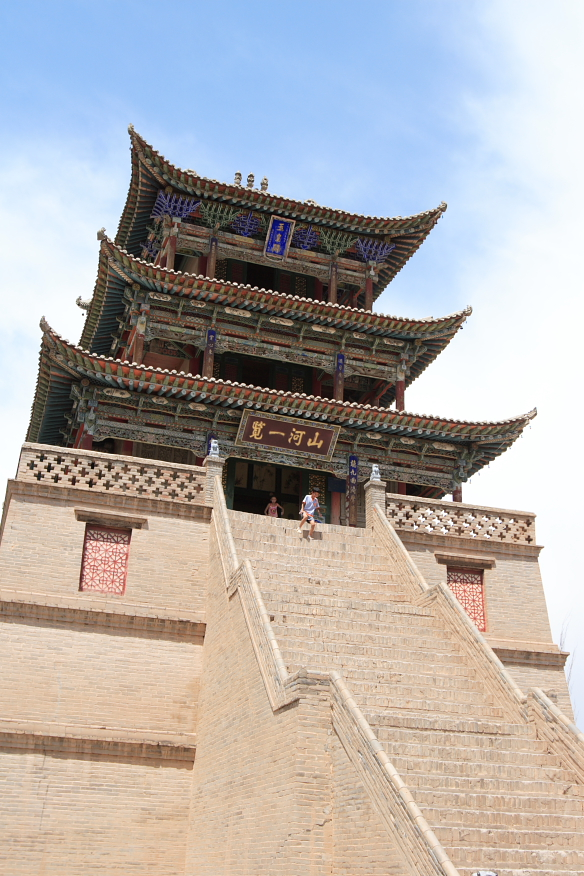
Tower of the Jade Emperor (玉皇阁 Yùhuánggé), central pavilion of a temple to the supreme godhead, in Guide, Qinghai. Jade Emperor shrines are frequently built on raised platforms, especially in western China.

Sino-Babylonianism is the theory (now rejected by most scholars) that in the third millennium B.C., the civilization which existed in the Babylonian region provided the essential elements of material civilization and language to what is now China. Albert Terrien de Lacouperie (1845–1894) was the first theorist to hypothesize that a massive migration by Babylonians brought the basic elements of early civilization to China, but the original form of this theory was largely discredited.

In the late 20th and early 21st centuries, scholars have used newly excavated archeological evidence to argue that some particular elements of ancient Chinese civilization were carried from western or central Asia into China and that there are linguistic ties between the two sides of the Asian continent.

== Lacouperie's theory ==
The French Sinologist Albert Terrien de Lacouperie (1845–94) presented extensive and detailed arguments in The Western Origin of the Early Chinese Civilization, from 2300 B.C. to 200 A.D. (1892) that Chinese civilization had been founded by Babylonian immigrants. He wrote:

Everything in Chinese antiquity and traditions points to a western origin. No Sinologist who has studied the subject has been able to ascertain any other origin for the Chinese than one from the West. It is through the N.W. of China proper that they have gradually invaded the country, and that their present greatness began from very small beginnings some forty centuries ago.

Lacouperie claimed that the Yellow Emperor was an historical Mesopotamian tribal leader who led a massive migration of his people into China around 2300 BC and founded what later became Chinese civilization. He further claimed a similarity between the trigrams and hexagrams in the ancient Chinese text, the Yijing, and Mesopotamian hieroglyphs.

These theories of the Mesopotamian origins of Chinese civilization were supported by the Assyriologist Archibald Sayce in the Journal of the Royal Asiatic Society. They impressed the public but were criticised or dismissed by sinologists then and later. James Legge, whose still-admired translations of the Chinese Classics appeared at the same time as Lacouperie's, questioned Lacouperie's sinological competence. Legge's review of Terrien's translation of the I Ching charged that only "hasty ignorance" could have led to the mistakes in the translation, which included failing to consult the basic reference, the Kangxi Dictionary. Another reviewer labelled Lacouperie a "specious wonder-monger". But the final blow to Lacouperie's comparativist theories came when the University of Leiden sinologist, Gustav Schlegel dismissed his claims and insisted on the independent origin and autonoumous growth of Chinese civilisation. Schlegel set the tone for later Orientalists. Scholars went on to point out that monosyllabic Chinese characters could not be equated to polysyllabic Chaldean words used in Babylon; that in any case, knowledge of ancient Assyria was "dangerously uncertain" and too unreliable to make such claims; and that it had not even been established that Babylonian civilization was earlier than Chinese.

Lacouperie's theory on the Babylonian origins of the Chinese sixty year ganzhi cyclical calendar system fared little better. Scholars pointed out that the two systems differed both in concept and function: the Babylonian decimal system was used to count up to 60, where the cycle started again, while the Chinese system combined a cycle of twelve and a cycle of ten.

== Reception of Lacouperie in Asia ==
The theory of a Western origin for Chinese civilization reached Japan and was introduced into China in an extensive summary in Chinese by Shirakawa Jiro (白河次郞) and Kokubu Tanenori (國府種德) which omitted the academic refutation. The theory was known as Xilai Shuo (西來說). European sinologists found Lacouperie's evidence flimsy and reasoning faulty, but these criticisms were omitted from the 1900 presentation of Lacouperie's views, which seemed the most advanced Western scholarship on China. Chinese scholars of the time were eager to find ancient roots for the Chinese nation and to believe that the Yellow Emperor and other ancient figures were historical, not mythical. They were quickly attracted by "the historicization of Chinese mythology" that the two Japanese authors advocated.

Some Chinese revolutionary nationalists welcomed Lacouperie's picture of the Han race as ancient and civilized in contrast to the Manchus who had conquered China. They interpreted Lacouperie as supporting their anti-Manchu racist theories founded on recent translations of Herbert Spencer. The scholar Zhang Taiyan used Sino-Babylonianism and the newly introduced theory of social evolution to explain how the arrival of agricultural technology from Western Asia combined with the patrilineal family system of East Asia to transform China from a hunting-gathering society into a feudalistic state that controlled a complex agrarian economy.

In the 1920s, the discovery of Neolithic sites revived interest in Western connections with Chinese civilization. Scholars such as Gu Jiegang successfully attacked Lacouperie's theories and their Chinese supporters, but the Yellow Emperor retained his appeal as the progenitor of the Han race.

== Later theories ==
Scholars remained skeptical about the veracity of Sino-Babylonianism in its original or narrow form but they continued to explore the belief in the mixture of indigenous and pan-Eurasian elements in early Chinese culture. Ellsworth Huntington and Carl Whiting Bishop, writing in the 1920s and 1930s, applied the theories of hyperdiffusionism to China, arguing that all of the basic elements of early civilization were developed in western Asia and from there, they were diffused to the other parts of the continent, including China. The historian Ping-ti Ho was among the Chinese scholars who reacted to Sino-Babylonianism by asserting that all the important elements of early Chinese civilization were indigenous and developed in what is now China.

The scholars J. P. Mallory and Victor Mair made a series of arguments that resembled parts of the theory. They pointed to the mummies excavated in Tarim Basin in Chinese Central Asia that date from 1800 BCE to the first centuries BCE. These had bodily features that were Caucasoid rather than Chinese. They concede that scholars argue whether the earliest bronze technology in China was stimulated by contacts with western steppe cultures, but they conclude that the evidence favours the hypothesis.

The Sinologist John Didier made an extensive investigation of what he calls the "interactive Eurasian world, c. 9000–500 BC", that is, the mutual ties between ancient East Asia, South Asia, and the Middle-East, including Persia and Babylon. These exchanges, he argues, shaped the foundations and early evolution of East Asian technology, cosmology, religion, myth, rulership, divination, and literacy. Didier provides examples of the Middle Eastern origin or inspiration of astronomical systems and calendars, religious figures such as the Yellow Emperor, and religious myths based on astrological observation shared across the continent.

In 2016, Sun Weidong (孙卫东), a Chinese geochemist argued that the founders of Chinese civilization migrated from Egypt and were therefore not actually Chinese. He was led to this hypothesis when his radiometric dating of ancient Chinese bronzes found that their chemical composition was more similar to ancient Egyptian bronzes than to ores found in China. Sun went on to argue that the technology of Bronze Age widely thought to have come across Central Asia by land had in fact been brought by the Hyksos, a Levantine people who settled in the Nile Valley in the 17th and 16th centuries B.C. and may have fled by sea when their dynasty collapsed. The technologies that the Hyksos had earlier developed—bronze metallurgy, chariots, literacy, domesticated plants and animals—were precisely those that have been excavated at the Shang dynasty capital, Yinxu.

== See also ==
- Timeline of Chinese history
- Athanasius Kircher
- Western Pseudohistory Theory
- Dené–Caucasian languages, a proposed language family which includes Sino-Tibetan languages and sometimes, Sumerian is included in this proposed language family

== Sources ==
- Didier, John C. (2009). "In and Outside the Square: The Sky and the Power of Belief in Ancient China and the World, c. 4500 BC – AD 200". Sino-Platonic Papers (192). Volume I: The Ancient Eurasian World and the Celestial Pivot, Volume II: Representations and Identities of High Powers in Neolithic and Bronze China, Volume III: Terrestrial and Celestial Transformations in Zhou and Early-Imperial China.
- Hon, Tze-ki (2010), "From a Hierarchy in Time to a Hierarchy in Space: The Meanings of Sino-Babylonianism in Early Twentieth-Century China", Modern China, 36 (2): 136–69, doi:10.1177/0097700409345126, S2CID 144710078.
- Hon, Tze-ki (2015), The Allure of the Nation: The Cultural and Historical Debates in Late Qing, Brill, ISBN 9789004290501
- Laufer, Berthold (1919), Sino-Iranica: Chinese Contributions to the History of Civilization in Ancient Iran, with Special Reference to the History of Cultivated Plants and Products, Anthropological Series Volume 15, Issue 3, Chicago: Field Museum of Natural HistoryFree online
- Lewis, Ricardo (2 September 2016). "Does Chinese Civilization Come From Ancient Egypt?". Foreign Policy.
- Mallory, J. P.; Mair, Victor H. (2000), The Tarim Mummies: Ancient China and the Mystery of the Earliest Peoples from the West, London: Thames & Hudson.
- Sun, Jiang; Hu, Minghui (2016). "Did The Yellow Emperor Come From Babylonia?". In Hu, Minghui (ed.). Cosmopolitanism in China. Cambria Press. pp. online. ISBN 9781621967118.
- Lacouperie, Terrien de (1894). Western Origin of the Early Chinese Civilisation from 2,300 B.C. To 200 A.D. : Or : Chapters on the Elements Derived from the Old Civilisations of West Asia in the Formation of the Ancient Chinese Culture. London: Asher & Co. Internet Archive
