= Jan Boeke =

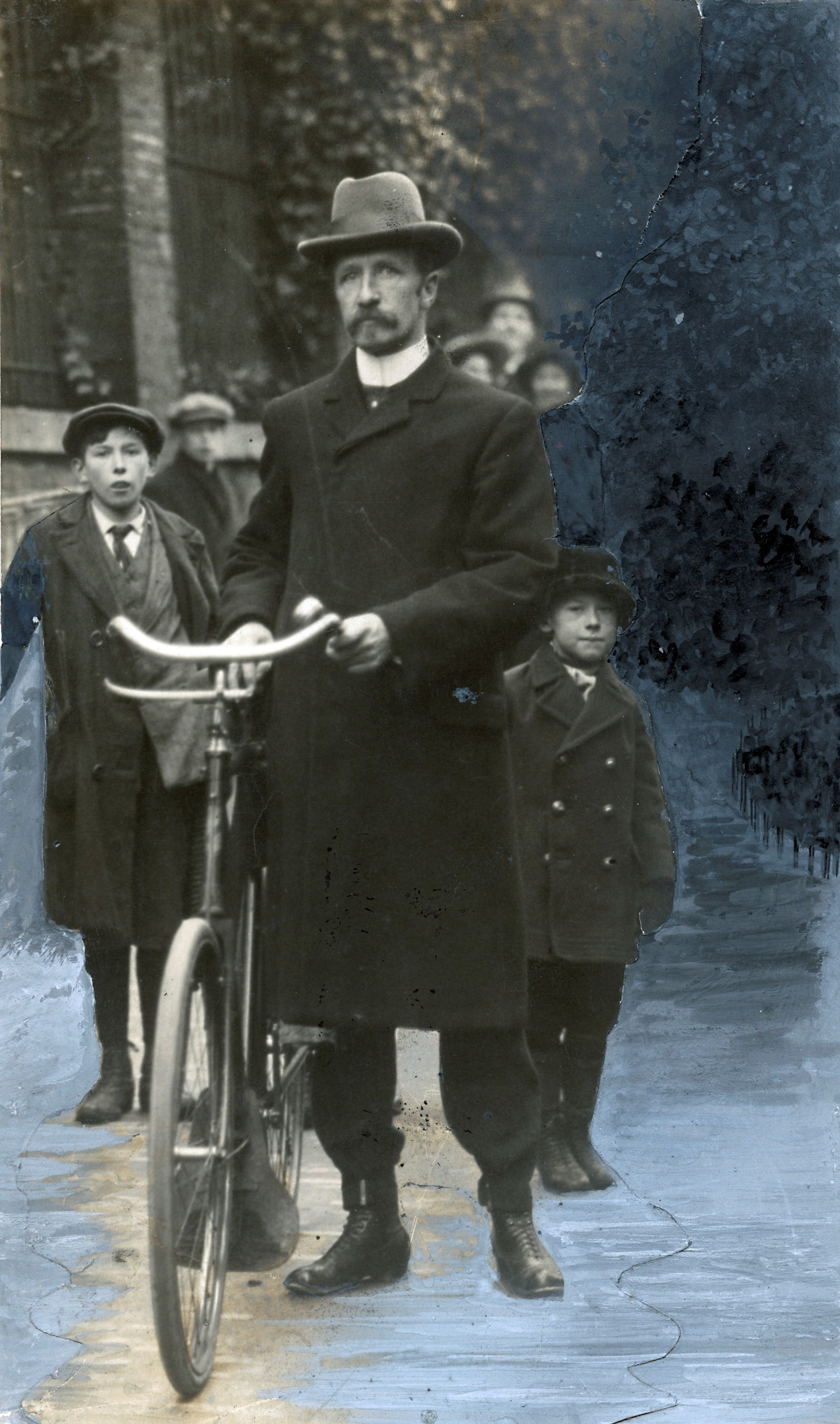
- Boeke in 1917
- Born: 23 October 1874; Hengelo, Netherlands
- Died: 12 September 1956 (aged 81); Bandung, West Java, Indonesia
- Occupation: Professor
- Title: Rector Magnificus
- Parent(s): Izak Herman (father); Sara Maria van Gelder (mother)
- Relatives: Julius Herman Boeke (brother)

Academic background
- Education: University of Amsterdam
- Influences: István Apáthy

Academic work
- Discipline: Anatomy
- Institutions: University of Utrecht
- Main interests: Nerve degeneration and regeneration

Jan Boeke (23 October 1874 – 12 September 1956) was a Dutch anatomist and neuro-histologist who worked at the University of Utrecht serving as Rector Magnificus in 1937 and in 1945 with a gap due to the German invasion in World War II. His major experimental work was on nerve degeneration and regeneration. In 1940 he published Problems of nervous anatomy which review nerve histology in relation to physiology. Boeke was born in Hengelo to Mennonite pastor Izak Herman and Sara Maria van Gelder. His brother Julius Herman Boeke became an economist. Educated at the Gymnasium he went to study medicine at the University of Amsterdam. Graduating in 1900 he worked with Hugo de Vries and then went to the marine research station in Naples under Professor Anton Dohrn to study embryology in Muraena helena. While in Naples he met the Hungarian histologist István Apáthy who introduced him to the complexity of nerves and the problems involved in their study. He then became an assistant to physiologist Place and worked on the pharmacology of the heart in response to alcohol, muscarine and digitalis. In 1905 he worked on fishing in Curaçao and in 1906 he became a lecturer in Leiden and a professor of anatomy in 1909. In 1918 he moved to Utrecht. He held a holistic view of organism control and did not believe in the contemporary ideas promoted by Rudolf Virchow that the properties of individual cells decided the behaviour of the organism.

During German occupation he was investigated for "illegal activities" including teaching and publishing that there was no such thing as "pure races". His house was raided and his collections of histological specimens was destroyed. Two of his children died in captivity. His brother was also arrested. His position as rector was restored after World War II and he became an emeritus professor in 1946. He died in Bandung in 1956 where a son was completing his training as a surgeon.

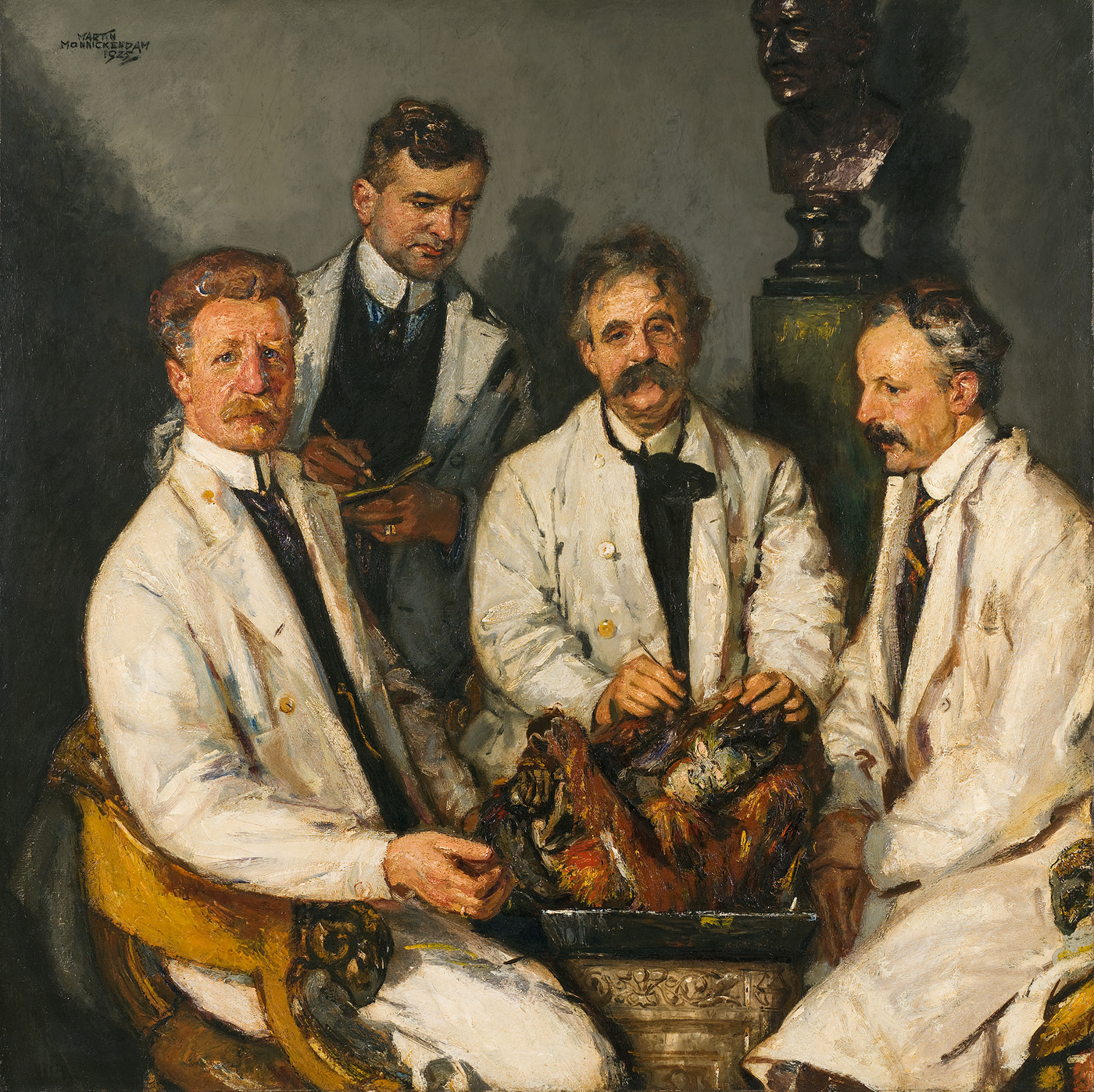
Painting by Martin Monnickendam, 1925, De anatomische les van professor Louis Bolk ("The anatomy lesson by professor Louis Bolk") depicting, left to right, Jan Boeke, Jan Barge, Louis Bolk, and Arnold van den Broek

Boeke conducted studies on the peripheral nervous system. He examined the degeneration of nerve endings in Eimer's organ in moles following sectioning of the trigeminal nerve. His group also conduct grafts of tissue types from duck bills to their feet and vice versa to examine generation and regeneration of Grandry and Herbst corpuscles. In 1925 he and a colleague examined the regeneration of sensation of a colleague who had lacerated a nerve at his wrist.
