= Schweidnitz =

Schweidnitz is the German name for Świdnica, Poland. It may also refer to:

- Anna von Schweidnitz (1339-1362), Holy Roman Empress
- Nikolaus Stör von Schweidnitz (d. 1424), Roman Catholic theologian
- Johannes Hoffmann von Schweidnitz (1375-1451), Roman Catholic theologian
