= T'oung Pao =

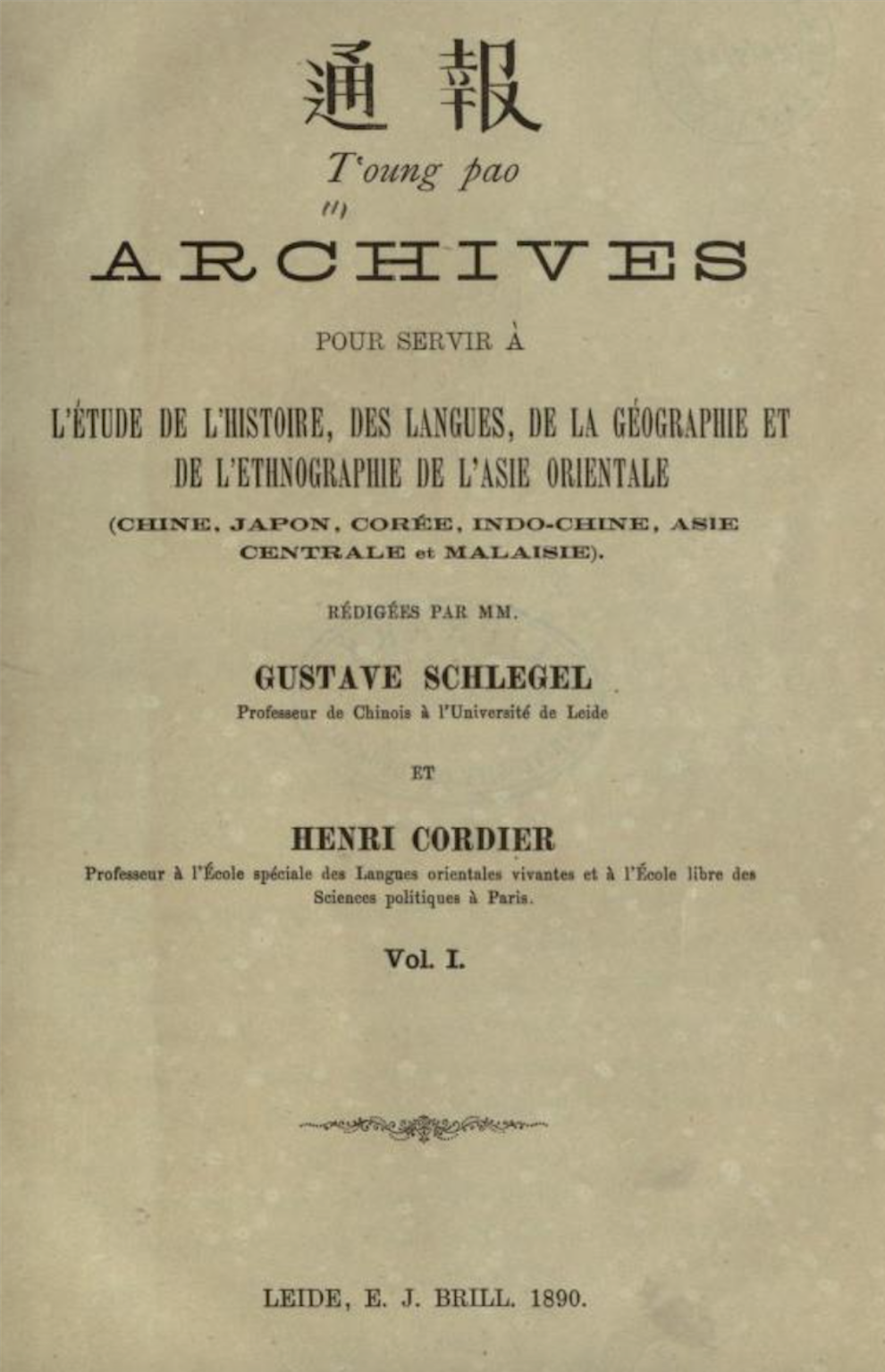
- Cover of first volume (1890)
- Discipline: Sinology
- Language: English, French, and German
- Edited by: Vincent Goossaert, Martin Kern, and James Robson

Publication details
- History: 1890–present
- Publisher: E. J. Brill
- Frequency: 5/year

Standard abbreviations
- ISO 4: T'oung Pao

Indexing
- ISSN: 0082-5433

Links
- Journal homepage

T'oung Pao
- Traditional Chinese: 通報
- Simplified Chinese: 通报
Transcriptions
Standard Mandarin
- Hanyu Pinyin: Tōngbào
- Gwoyeu Romatzyh: Tongbaw
- Wade–Giles: T'ung pao
- IPA: [tʰʊ́ŋ.pâʊ]
Southern Min
- Hokkien POJ: Thong-pò

T'oung Pao ([tʰʊ́ŋ.pâʊ]; Chinese: 通報; pinyin: Tōngbào; lit. 'Bulletins'), founded in 1890, is a Dutch journal and the oldest international journal of sinology. It is published by the publisher E. J. Brill.

T'oung Pao's original full title was T'oung Pao ou Archives pour servir à l'étude de l'histoire, des langues, la geographie et l'ethnographie de l'Asie Orientale (Chine, Japon, Corée, Indo-Chine, Asie Centrale et Malaisie) ("Tongbao or Archives for Use in the Study of the History, Languages, Geography, and Ethnography of East Asia [China, Japan, Korea, Indochina, Central Asia, and Malaysia]").

The first co editors-in-chief were Henri Cordier and Gustav Schlegel. The journal's title T'oung Pao appears to be romanized based on the system of Jean Baptiste Bourguignon d'Anville, rather than Wade–Giles.

Traditionally, T'oung Pao was co-edited by two sinologists, one from France and one from the Netherlands. However, the tradition has been discontinued. The current editors are Paul R. Goldin (American – University of Pennsylvania), Vincent Goossaert (French – Centre national de la recherche scientifique), and James Robson (American – Harvard University).

== List of past editors ==
Dutch

- Gustav Schlegel (1890–1903)
- J.J.L. Duyvendak (1934–1954)
- A.F.P. Hulsewé (1954–1975)

French

- Henri Cordier (1890–1925)
- Édouard Chavannes (1904–1916)
- Paul Pelliot (1920–1942)
- Paul Demiéville (1945–1975)

== See also ==
- The China Quarterly
