= Julius Herman Boeke =

Dutch economist and lawyer

- Boeke (1924)
- Born: 15 November 1884; Wormerveer
- Died: 9 January 1956 (aged 71); Leiden
- Occupations: Professor, Universiteit Leiden
- Known for: Constitutional law

Julius Herman Boeke (Wormerveer, Netherlands, 15 November 1884 — Leiden, 9 January 1956) was a Dutch economist and lawyer. He was a professor of Tropical-Colonial Economics at Leiden University, where he lectured and published works on the subject of the economy of the Dutch East Indies.

== Early life ==
Boeke was born in Wormerveer, Netherlands. His father was Izaäk Herman Boeke, a Mennonite preacher. He spent his primary and secondary school years in Amsterdam, passing his final exams at the Barlaeus Gymnasium in 1903. He then studied at the Faculty of Arts of Gemeentelijke_Universiteit. He graduated in 1906, obtaining a degree in law within eight months and completing his doctoral exam in 1909. In 1910, he obtained his PhD from Leiden University with Cornelis van Vollenhoven as his mentor. His thesis was focused on tropical-colonial economics. His dissertation described how the Indian population appeared to respond differently to economic incentives compared to Western populations. His brother Jan Boeke became a professor of anatomy at the University of Utrecht.

=== Dutch East Indies ===
On 1 September 1910 he traveled to the Dutch East Indies with duties to-be-determined by the Governor-General, ultimately finding a position at the General Secretariat. He worked there for a few months, after which he transferred to the Gymnasium Willem III in Batavia. He taught state design and economics. He was assigned a position as acting adviser for the Volkskredietwezen in 1914.

In 1919, he was promoted to become an adviser. This was the highest position at the Volkskredietwezen at the time. He was offered a full professorship of colonial economics at the Nederlandsche Handels-Hoogeschool, and was also offered a special professorship of tropical colonial economics at Leiden University. He refused both. He was offered a chair at the Law School in 1924, assigned to the instruction of household economics and statistics. He gave his first lectures during the academic year 1926-1927. The following year he traveled to India, and then returned to the Netherlands.

In 1929, Leiden University again offered him a professorship, which he accepted. He taught tropical colonial economics. The year before, he argued during his inaugural lecture for the introduction of a dualistic economic system in the Dutch East Indies. He contended that Western economy theory was not applicable to Asian village communities. He focused on the economic sciences and he expanded his research to Japan and India. In 1940, he published Indian Economics (re-titled Economy of Indonesia in 1951).

=== Imprisonment, postwar scholarship ===
During the Second World War, Boeke took part in the Leiden resistance. In 1941, he published his work National Socialist State Household, which criticized the economic theories of the National Socialist Movement. As a result, he was fired and deported to Buchenwald Concentration Camp and next he was interned in various camps for the Dutch elite in the Netherlands. He was released in September 1944. He survived the war and was reappointed as professor.

He returned to Indonesia, to help with the reconstruction of the University of Indonesia, but an accident required his return to Leiden, as well as a period of convalescence. He ultimately resumed his activities at Leiden University. During academic year 1951-1952 he held the position of rector magnificus. He officially retired in 1955 to take a new teaching assignment.

He died on 9 January 1956 after a brief illness.

== Works ==
- Tropisch-koloniale staathuishoudkunde. Het probleem. Amsterdam 1910
- Coöperatie in Britsch-Indië. Weltevreden 1929
- Dualistische economie. Leiden 1930
- Crediet-coöperatie Boemipoetera. Batavia 1931
- Les Indes Néerlandaises et la crise. Brussel 1933
- Dorp en desa. Leiden 1934
- Indische economie. Haarlem 1940, 1947
- The structure of Netherlands Indian economy. New York 1942, 1946. 1983
- The evolution of the Netherlands Indies economy. New York 1946
- Oosterse economie. Den Haag 1946, 1955
- The interests of the voiceless Far East : introduction to oriental economics. Leiden 1948
- Ontwikkelingsgang en toekomst van bevolkings- en ondernemingslandbouw in Nederlands-Indië. Leiden 1948
- Agrarische hervormingen in het verre Oosten. Amsterdam 1951
- Economie van Indonesië. Haarlem, 3. druk. 1951; 4. druk. 1953, 5. druk. 1955
- Economics and economic policy of dual societies, as exemplified by Indonesia. Haarlem 1953
- Western influence on the growth of Eastern population. Geneve 1954

== Sources ==
- L. G. M. Jaquet: Boeke, Julius Herman (1884–1956). In: Biografisch Woordenboek van Nederland. (BWN) Den Haag, 1979, (Online)
- J. H. A. Logemann: Levensbericht J. H. Boeke. In: Jaarboek der Koninklijke Nederlandse Akademie van Wetenschappen, 1956–1957. Amsterdam, Blz. 244–252 (Online)
- Profiel op Leidse hoogleraren

Preceded by Siegfried Thomas Bok	Rector magnificus of Leiden University; 1951–1952	Succeeded by J.J.L. Duyvendak
