= J. J. M. de Groot =

Dutch sinologist and historian of religion

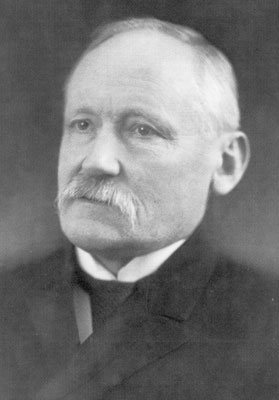
- Born: Jan Jakob Maria de Groot; 18 February 1854; Schiedam, Netherlands
- Died: 24 September 1921 (aged 67); Berlin, Germany
- Scientific career
- Fields: Chinese history, religion
- Workplaces: Leiden University
- Academic advisors: Gustaaf Schlegel
- Notable students: J.J.L. Duyvendak

Chinese name
- Chinese: 高延
Transcriptions
Standard Mandarin
- Hanyu Pinyin: Gāo Yán
- Wade–Giles: Kao^{1} Yen^{2}

Jan Jakob Maria de Groot (18 February 1854 – 24 September 1921) was a Dutch sinologist and historian of religion. He taught at the Leiden University and later at the University of Berlin, and is chiefly remembered for his monumental work, The Religious System of China, Its Ancient Forms, Evolution, History and Present Aspect, Manners, Customs and Social Institutions Connected Therewith. The two "books" of this detailed and well-illustrated treatise appeared in six volumes - and, according to the preface in the first volume, the System was originally meant to include several more "books".

De Groot became a corresponding member of the Royal Netherlands Academy of Arts and Sciences in 1887, a foreign member in 1892 and a regular member in 1911.

== Writing ==
In his The Religious System of China, de Groot contended that fengshui was "a mere chaos of childish absurdities and refined mysticism" and a "ridiculous caricature of science." Academic Albert Wu observes that de Groot "nonetheless took the phenomenon of fengshui seriously, seeking to situate it within what he saw as China's historical and anthropological development." De Groot's ethnographic accounts depicted fengshui as based in respect for nature, and as a "quasi-scientific system" that instructed "where and how to build graves, temples and dwellings" so that people could enjoy "the auspicious influences of nature."

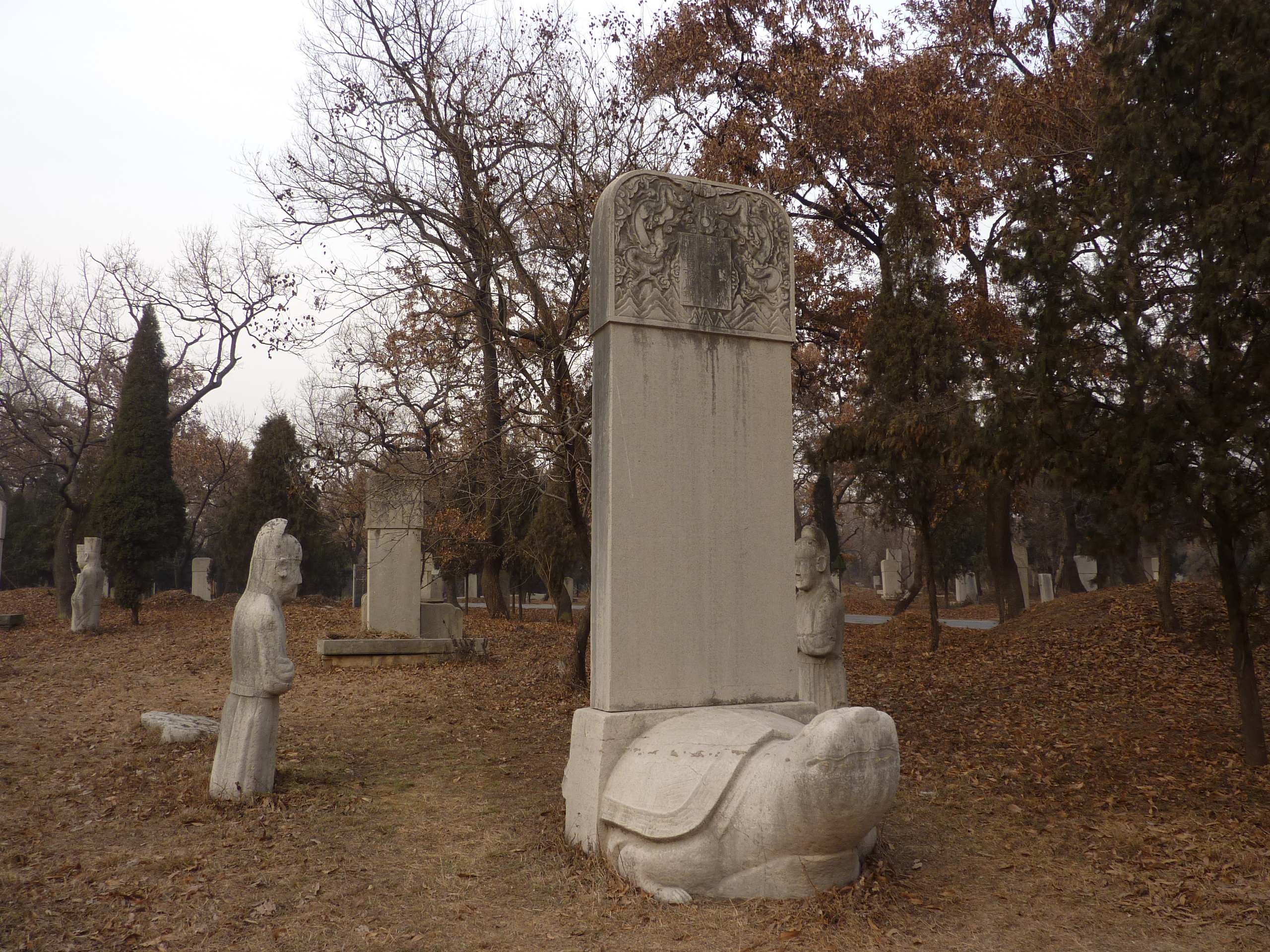
Among a plethora of other topics, De Groot's Religious System of China contains a detailed study of China's funerary stelae, and the mythical animals used to decorate them

=== Bibliography ===
- J. J. M. de Groot, The Religious System of China, Brill, Leiden, 1892–1910, rééd. Taipei 1964
  - vol. I : Disposal of the Dead. Part I : Funeral rites. Part II : The ideas of resurrection, 1892, XXIV-360 p
  - vol. II : Disposal of the Dead. Part III : The Grave (first half), 1894, 468 p. : book I : Disposal of the Dead, p. 359-827
  - vol. III : Disposal of the Dead. The Grave (second half). Fung-shui,1897, 640 p.
  - vol. IV : The soul and Ancestral Worship. Part I : The Soul in Philosophy and Folk-Conception, 464 p.
  - vol. V : The soul and Ancestral Worship. Part II : Demonology. Part III : Sorcery, 1908, 464 p.
  - vol. VI : The soul and Ancestral Worship. Part IV : The War against Spectres. Part V : The prietshood of Animism (wu), 1910, 414 p.
  - index for volumes I, II, III, 40 p.
- J. J. M. de Groot, Universismus - Die Grundlage der Religion und Ethik, des Staatswesens und der Wissenschaften Chinas
- J. J. M. de Groot, Sectarianism and religious persecution in China : a page in the history of religions I, II
