= Paul Demiéville =

Swiss-French sinologist and Orientalist

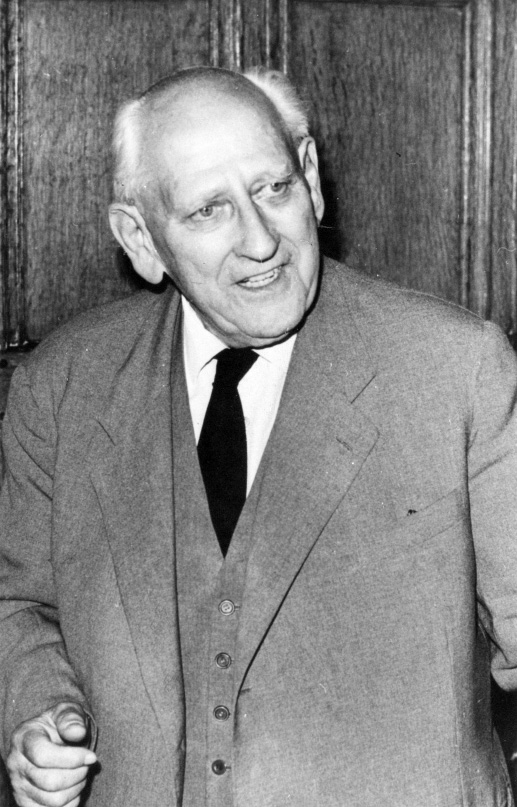
- Born: 13 September 1894; Lausanne, Switzerland
- Died: 23 March 1979 (aged 84); Paris, France
- Citizenship: French (naturalized in 1931)
- Spouse: Helène Demiéville
- Scientific career
- Fields: Buddhism, Chinese poetry
- Institutions: Collège de France
- Academic advisors: Édouard Chavannes, Sylvain Lévi

Chinese name
- Chinese: 戴密微
Transcriptions
Standard Mandarin
- Hanyu Pinyin: Dài Mìwēi
- Wade–Giles: Tai^{4} Mi^{4}-wei^{1}

Paul Demiéville (13 September 1894 – 23 March 1979) was a Swiss-French sinologist and Orientalist known for his studies of the Dunhuang manuscripts and Buddhism and his translations of Chinese poetry, as well as for his 30-year tenure as co-editor of T'oung Pao.

Demiéville was one of the foremost sinologists of the first half of the 20th century, and was known for his wide-ranging contributions to Chinese and Buddhist scholarship. His influence on Chinese scholarship in France was particularly profound, as he was the only major French sinologist to survive World War II.

Demiéville was one of the first sinologists to learn Japanese to augment their study of China: prior to the early 20th century, most scholars of China learned Manchu as their second scholarly language, but Demiéville's study of Japanese instead has been followed by nearly every major sinologist since his day.

== Early life ==
Paul Demiéville was born on 13 September 1894 in Lausanne, Switzerland, a son of a prominent physician in Lausanne. Combined with the family's Swiss citizenship, his father's status and income allowed Demiéville to receive an international and multicultural upbringing far beyond most of his contemporaries. A native speaker of French, he learned Italian as a boy during his family's summer holidays in Italy, then perfected his German as a student in Bern, where he earned his baccalaureate (secondary school diploma) in 1911.

Following his completion of secondary school, Demiéville spent time studying in Munich, London, and Edinburgh, where he was able to attend lectures by George Saintsbury at the University of Edinburgh. He then attended the University of Paris, where he wrote an essay on the musical suite of the 17th and 18th centuries and was awarded a licentiate degree in 1914. Demiéville then spent the year 1915 studying at King's College London where he was introduced to Chinese, which quickly became his focus. After returning to France, Demiéville studied at the École des Langues Orientales Vivantes (School of Living Oriental Languages), after which he moved to the Collège de France, where he further studied Chinese under the tutelage of Édouard Chavannes and began learning Sanskrit from Sylvain Lévi. He earned his Diplômé from the École des Langues Orientales Vivantes in 1919.

== Career ==
After completing his Diplômé in 1919, Demiéville was named a resident of the École française d'Extrême-Orient (French School of the Far East) in Hanoi, where he lived from 1920 to 1924. In 1924 he moved to southeast China, where he taught Sanskrit and philosophy at the University of Amoy (modern Xiamen University). In 1926 Demiéville moved to Tokyo, Japan, where he became director of the Maison Franco-Japonaise (French-Japanese House) and also served as editor-in-chief of Sylvain Lévi's historic Hôbôgirin, Dictionnaire Encyclopédique du Bouddhisme (Hōbōgirin 法寶義林: An Encyclopedic Dictionary of Buddhism), which was first published in 1929.

Demiéville returned to France in 1930 and was made a French citizen by decree the following year, when he was named Professor of Chinese at the École des Langues Orientales, where he stayed throughout World War II. In 1945 he became director of the 4th Section of the École Pratique des Haute Études and taught Buddhist philosophy there until 1956. In 1946, Demiéville was selected to replace Henri Maspero as Chair of Chinese Language and Literature at the Collège de France – Maspero having died in the Buchenwald concentration camp in 1945 – and held that position until his retirement in 1964. In 1951, Demiéville was honored with membership in the Académie des Inscriptions et Belles-Lettres.

From 1945 to 1975, Demiéville served as the French co-editor of the prominent sinology journal T'oung Pao, which was traditionally co-edited by one sinologist from France and another from the Netherlands.

== Selected works ==
- (in French) ––– (1924). "Les Versions chinoises du Milindapanha" ("Chinese Versions of the Milinda Panha"), Bulletin de l'École française d'Extrême-Orient, no. XXIV, pp. 1–258.
- (in French) ––– (1929). "Sur l'authenticité du Ta tch'eng k'i sin louen" ("On the Authenticity of the Da cheng qi xin lun 大乘起新論"), Bulletin de la Maison Franco-Japonaise, vol. 2, no. 2, pp. 1–78.
- ––– (1935). "Iconography and History", in The Twin Pagodas of Zayton: A Study of Later Buddhist Sculpture in China, Harvard-Yenching Institute Monograph Series, vol. 2. Cambridge, Mass.: Harvard-Yenching Institute, pp. 27–95.
- (in French) ––– (1951). "À propos du Concile de Vaiśāli" ("Regarding the Council of Vaiśāli"). T'oung Pao 40. Leiden: E.J. Brill, pp. 239–296.
- (in French) ––– (1952). Le Concile de Lhasa: Une controverse sur la quiétisme entre bouddhistes de l'inde et de le Chine au VIIIème siècle (The Council of Lhasa: A controversy on quietism between Buddhists of India and China in the 8th century). Paris: Bibliothèque de l'Institut des Hautes Études chinoises.
- (in French) ––– (1954). "La Yogācārabhūmi de Sangharaksa" ("The Yogācārabhūmi of Sangharaksa"). Bulletin du l'École française d'Extrême-Orient, no. XLIV, 2, pp. 339–436.
