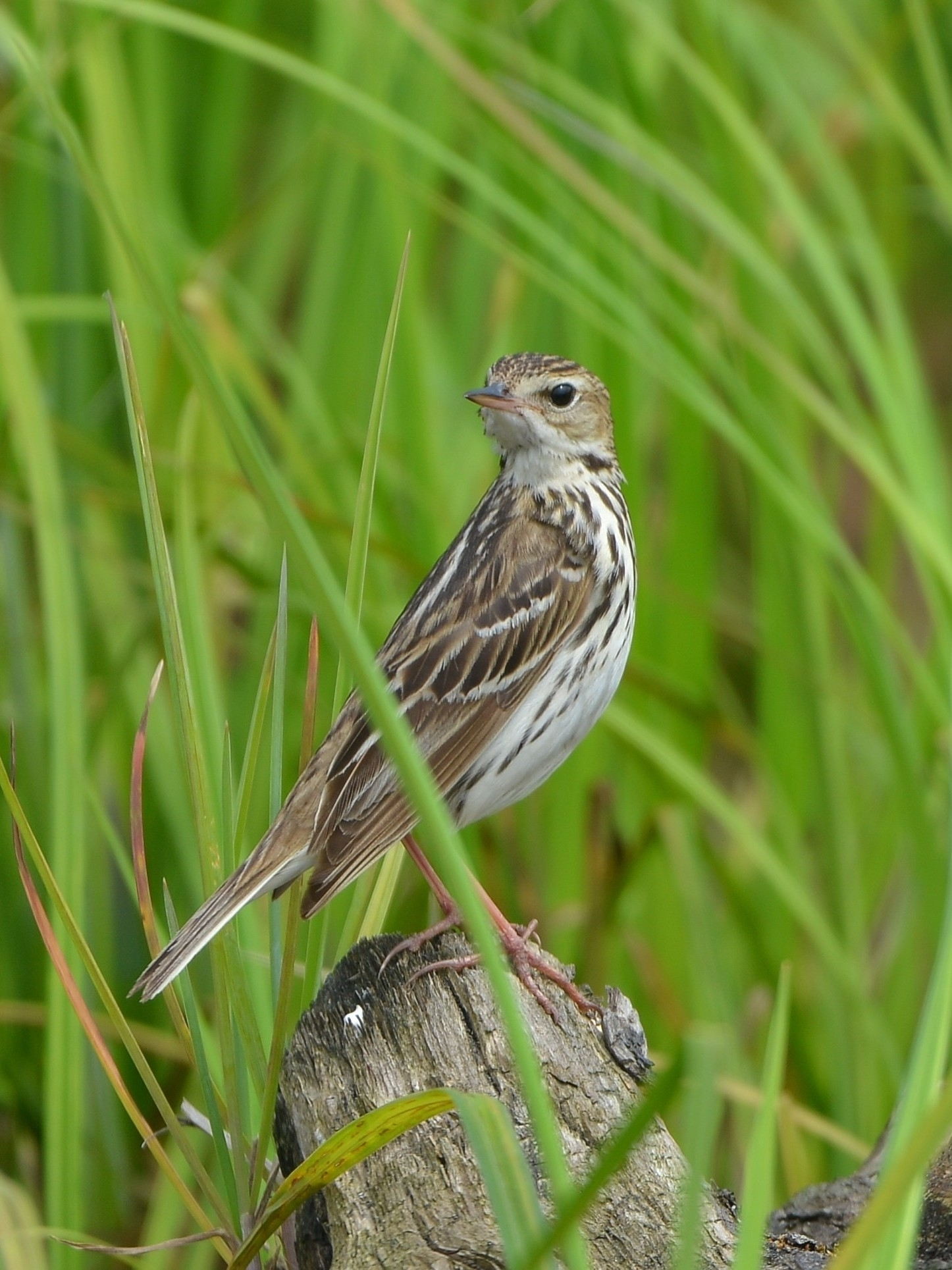

Conservation status
- Least Concern (IUCN 3.1)

Scientific classification
- Kingdom: Animalia
- Phylum: Chordata
- Class: Aves
- Order: Passeriformes
- Family: Motacillidae
- Genus: Anthus
- Species: A. gustavi

Binomial name
- Anthus gustavi R. Swinhoe, 1863

= Pechora pipit =

Species of bird

The Pechora pipit (Anthus gustavi) is a small passerine bird which breeds in the East Palearctic tundra and densely vegetated areas near river banks ranges from the Pechora River to the Chukchi Peninsula. It also breeds in Kamchatka and the Commander Islands, and with a disjunct population much further south in northeastern China and southeastern Siberia. It is a long-distance migrant, moving in winter to Indonesia. Rarely in September and October, the Pechora pipit may be observed in western Europe. The species was first described by Robert Swinhoe in 1863.

== Taxonomy ==
There are two subspecies:

- Anthus gustavi gustavi Swinhoe, 1863 — Arctic shrub tundra across northern Siberia
- Anthus gustavi menzbieri Shulpin, 1928 — Temperate southeastern Siberia, northeastern China, in the Ussuri and lower Amur river basins

The southern subspecies may be better treated as a separate species, as it differs markedly in ecology and also somewhat in morphology and song, but genetic analysis has yet to be carried out.

== Description ==
A. gustavi is a small pipit, which somewhat resembles non-breeding red-throated pipit in plumage. It is heavily streaked brown above, with whitish mantle stripes, and with black markings on a white belly and buff breast below. It can be distinguished from red-throated pipit by its heavier bill, whiter mantle stripes, and contrast between its buff breast and white belly.

This species creeps in long grass, and is reluctant to fly even when disturbed. Its call is a distinctive electrical zip. Although the call is generally helpful when identifying pipits, this species calls far less than most. This, combined with its skulking habits, makes this a difficult species to find and identify away from its breeding grounds in the Arctic.

The best place in western Europe to see Pechora pipit, where it is a rare vagrant, is Fair Isle, Shetland. The lack of cover on this small island makes skulking passerines easier to find.

The breeding habitat is damp tundra, open forest or marshland. The nest is on the ground, with four or five eggs being laid. It is insectivorous, like its relatives.

== Etymology ==
The genus name Anthus is from Latin and is the name for a small bird of grasslands. The specific gustavi commemorates the Dutch naturalist Gustaaf Schlegel.

The English name is derived from the Pechora River in northwest Russia, where the first discovery of its breeding grounds was made by Henry Seebohm in 1875. The species was known earlier from its spring passage and wintering grounds, being discovered by Gustaaf Schlegel in Amoy (now Xiamen) in southeast China in the early 1860s.
