= Decree of Kutná Hora =

1409 decree by King Wenceslaus IV

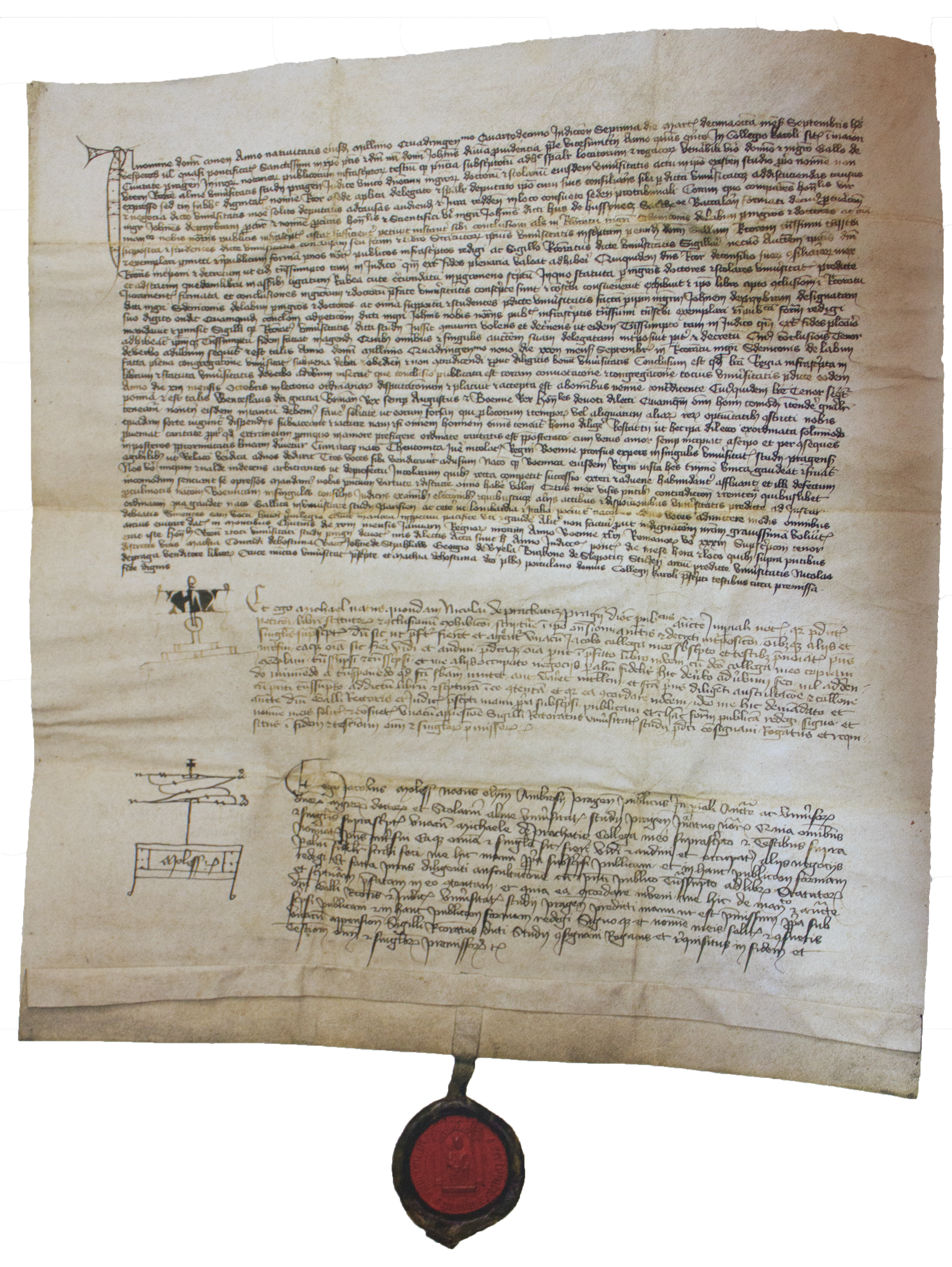
Decree of Kutná Hora, deed issued on 18 September 1418 for Jan Hus

The Decree of Kutná Hora (Czech: Dekret Kutnohorský) or Decree of Kuttenberg (German: Kuttenberger Dekret) was issued on 18 January 1409 in Kutná Hora (Kuttenberg), Bohemia, by King Wenceslaus IV to give members of the Bohemian nation a decisive voice in the affairs of the Charles University in Prague.

Since the university was founded by King Charles IV in 1348, the studium generale was divided among Bohemian (including German-speaking inhabitants), Bavarian, Saxon, and Polish "nations". From 1403 onwards, the religious Lollard movement and the doctrines of the Oxford theologian John Wycliffe led to controversy at the Prague University. The Bohemian reformers around Jan Hus wanted to teach this new doctrine, but most German masters and professors voted against the new "heretic" thinking.

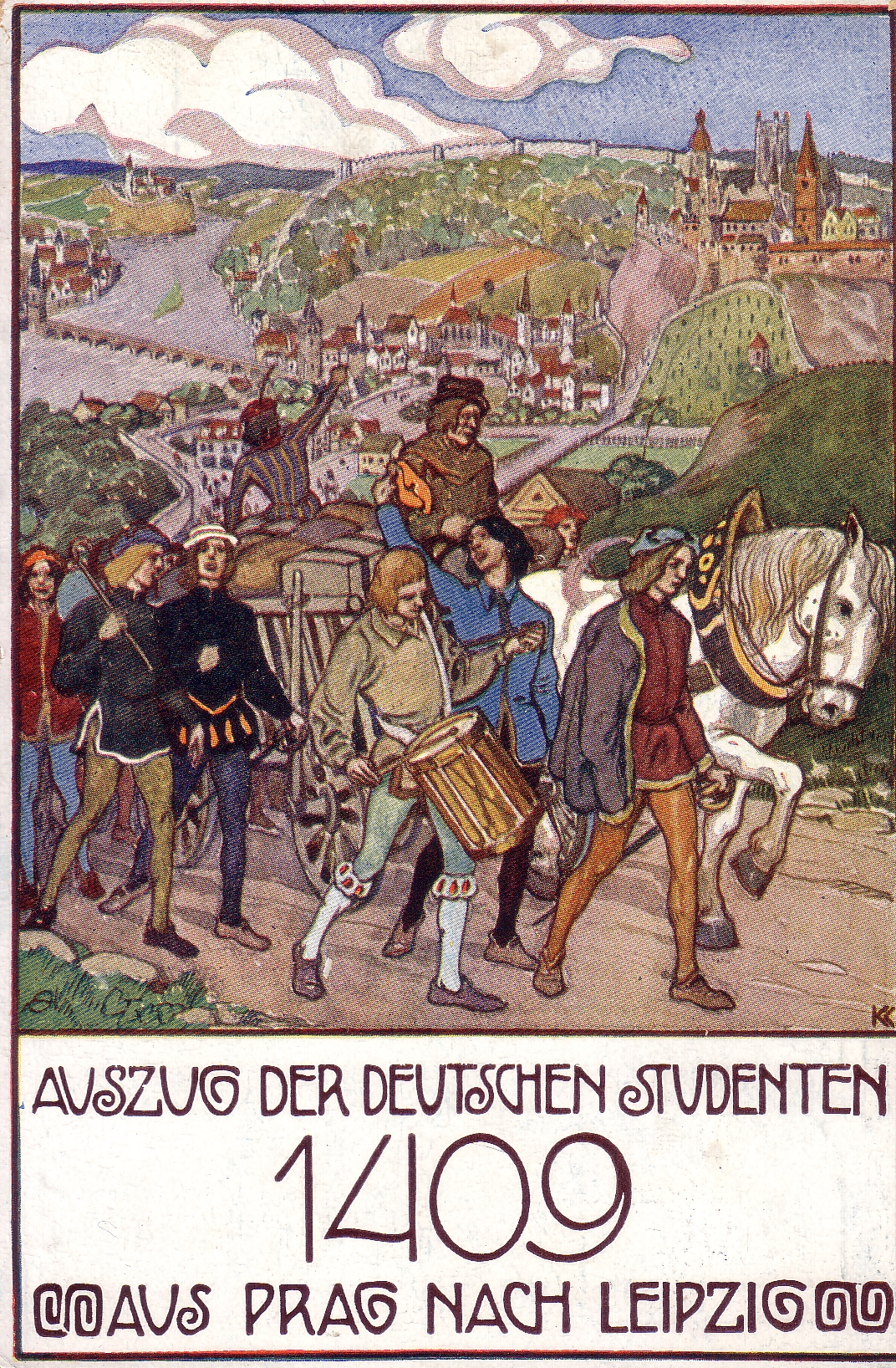
German students leaving Prague for Leipzig (postcard, c. 1909)

In anticipation of the Council of Pisa, the three "foreign" nations (Poland, Bavaria and Saxony) at the university opposed the request of Wenceslaus to take a neutral attitude between the two rival popes in the Western Schism. Wenceslaus himself hoped for support of a new Pope to regain the German kingship after his deposition by Rupert of the Palatinate nine years before. However, King Rupert, relying on the support of Pope Gregory XII and the Prague archbishop Zbyněk Zajíc of Hazmburk, pressured German teachers and students not to side with his Bohemian rival.

A delegation led by Jerome of Prague went to Wenceslaus' court staying at the royal city of Kutná Hora (according to other sources at Točník Castle), where the king promised to change the constitution of the university. On 18 January 1409, he had the statutes amended: with his decree, he gave the Bohemian nation three votes and one single vote to the other three nations combined. Shortly after that, Hus himself became rector of the university, succeeding Johannes Hoffmann von Schweidnitz. As another result of the Decree of Kutná Hora, numerous German academics (about 80 percent of the teaching staff) and their students left the university. This exodus resulted in the foundation of the University of Leipzig in the Margravate of Meissen, among others, and led to a considerable isolation of the Prague university. In 1417 the university officially adopted the Hussite confession and henceforth, Utraquist scholars taught and studied here. The rising influence of this doctrine and the execution of Jan Hus in 1415 culminated in the outbreak of the Hussite Wars.
