= Wonderism =

Wonderism is a term coined by French sinologist Terrien de Lacouperie (1845–1894) to differentiate the proto-Daoism of Jixia Academy from the philosophical Daoism of Laozi, although his ideas were received with skepticism at the time of assertion and have since been discredited by modern sinology.

Lacouperie believed that Chinese civilization was influenced by early sea traders from the Erythraean Sea and Indian Ocean who established a settlement in East China circa 675 BCE. It was located in the Zhou dynasty state of Qi 齊 (present day Shandong Province) at Langye 琅琊 (near Linyi) and Jimo 即墨 (northeast and southwest of Jiaozhou Bay). In the history of Ancient Chinese coinage, Jimo was an important mint where large bronze knife money called "Qi knives" were manufactured.

These foreigners, Sabaeans, Syrians and Hindus introduced new notions, such as astrology and superstitions, and by their sailors' yarns awakened a curiosity for the wonderful. The social and political condition of the country was favourable to a movement of this sort. The Chinese princes were anxious of novelty to show their independence from the once respected and now disregarded suzerainty of the Kings of Chou. It was really an age of wonderism.

According to Lacouperie, this school of thought combined with early philosophical Daoism to create religious Daoism.

The school of Wonderism, which had grown out of the influence of the trader-colonists of the Indian Ocean settled at Lang-ya and Tsih-Moh who had taught Astrology and an overrated conception of the transforming powers of nature, amalgamated with the pure Taoism of Lao-tze, and formed henceforth what may be called the Neo-Taoism or Tao-szeism, while Confucianism remained in opposition to it, such as his founder had conceived it against the encroachments of Wonderism, Taoism, and Shamanism. It was indeed the rising of Confucianism which led to the fusion of these various elements.

This terminology is outmoded. "Taoszeism" (from the French romanization tao-sze for daoshi 道士 "Daoist master, Daoist priest/priestess") was used by Léon de Rosny in reference to religious Daoism. "Neotaoism" or "Neodaoism" usually refers to Xuanxue 玄學 (lit. "arcane studies").
