= István Apáthy =

Hungarian zoologist and histologist

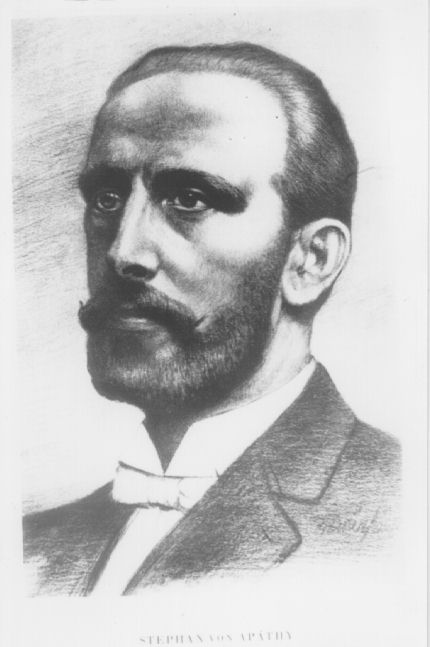
István Apáthy

István Apáthy, also known as Stephan Apáthy (1863–1922), was a Hungarian zoologist and histologist, known for his work in medical science and microscope technique. He particularly studied neurofibrils, and was known for improving microscopic techniques for dealing with tissue samples. Apáthy was a professor at the Franz Joseph University. He also theorized on the "social and political aspects" of eugenics.

== Biography ==
Apáthy was born in Budapest where his father was a professor of international law. After high school he went to study medicine and worked at the institute of pathology. He received his doctorate in 1885 and became an assistant to Tivadar Margó. In 1886-89 he was at Anton Dohrn's marine biology laboratory in Naples. He took a special interest in neurohistology and conducted studies on marine Hirudines, making use of techniques such as the injection of gold chloride to visualize the neural network. After World War I he became more politically active and the Hungarian Republic appointed him to Romania as commissioner of Transylvanian affairs but his outspoken views led to his imprisonment in Sibiu. He was however released and he returned to Szeged University. His health however declined and he died. His two-volume handbook of microscopic techniques was a very influential contribution.

== Eponymous taxa ==
Taxa named in honor of Stephan Apáthy include:

- Chamobates apathyi, a mite, (Tafner, 1905)
- Apathya, a lacertid genus with two species, Mehely, 1907
- Dina apathyi, a leech, Gedroyć, 1916
