= Ingouville =

- Commune
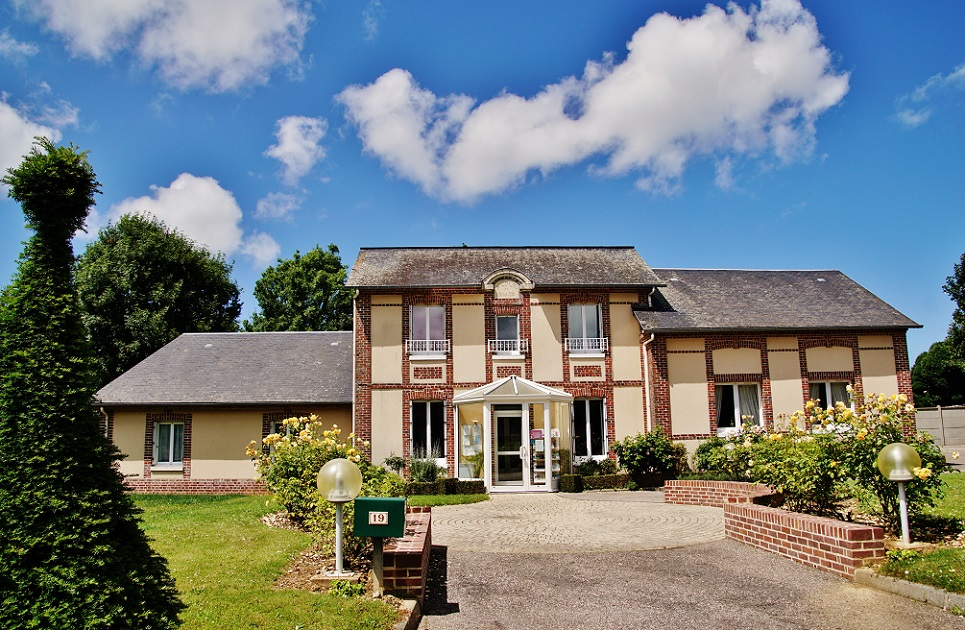
- The town hall in Ingouville

- Coat of arms
- Location of Ingouville
- Location within France Location within Normandy
- Coordinates: 49°50′26″N 0°41′16″E
- Country: France
- Region: Normandy
- Department: Seine-Maritime
- Arrondissement: Dieppe
- Canton: Saint-Valery-en-Caux
- Intercommunality: CC Côte d'Albâtre

Government
  - Mayor (2026–32): Jean-Claude Duboc
- Area^{1}: 7.91 km^{2} (3.05 sq mi)
- Elevation: 80 m (260 ft)
- Highest elevation: 81 m (266 ft)
- Lowest elevation: 0 m (0 ft)
- Population (2023): 282
  - Density: 35.7/km^{2} (92.3/sq mi)
- Time zone: UTC+01:00 (CET)
  - Summer (DST): UTC+02:00 (CEST)
- INSEE/Postal code: 76375 /76460
- ^{1} French Land Register data, which excludes lakes, ponds, glaciers > 1 km^{2} (0.386 sq mi or 247 acres) and river estuaries.

Ingouville (French pronunciation: [ɛ̃ɡuvil]), also known as Ingouville-sur-Mer ([ɛ̃ɡuvil syʁ mɛʁ], literally Ingouville on Sea), is a commune in the Seine-Maritime department in the Normandy region in northern France.

== Geography ==
A farming village situated in the Pays de Caux, some 20 miles (32 km) southwest of Dieppe at the junction of the D105 and the D925 roads. The small northern border of the commune comprises huge cliffs overlooking the English Channel.

== Population ==
Historical population
Year	Pop.	±% p.a.
1968	301	—
1975	225	−4.07%
1982	221	−0.26%
1990	266	+2.34%
1999	261	−0.21%
2007	265	+0.19%
2012	240	−1.96%
2017	270	+2.38%
2023	282	+0.73%
Source: INSEE

== Places of interest ==
- The church of St.Lubin, dating from the twelfth century.
- The nineteenth-century chateau.
- A sixteenth-century stone cross.

== See also ==
- Communes of the Seine-Maritime department
