= A. F. P. Hulsewé =

Dutch Sinologist and scholar (1910–1993)

- Born: 31 January 1910; Charlottenburg, Germany
- Died: 16 December 1993 (aged 83); Romont, Switzerland
- Education: Leiden University
- Spouses: C. Hoog (m. 1931-56, divorce); Marguerite Wazniewski
- Scientific career
- Fields: Chinese history, law
- Workplaces: Leiden University
- Doctoral advisor: J.J.L. Duyvendak
- Notable students: Wilt L. Idema

Chinese name
- Traditional Chinese: 何四維
- Simplified Chinese: 何四维
Transcriptions
Standard Mandarin
- Hanyu Pinyin: Hé Sìwéi
- Wade–Giles: Ho^{2} Ssu^{4}-wei^{2}
Southern Min
- Hokkien POJ: Hô Sì-uî

Anthony François Paulus Hulsewé (31 January 1910 – 16 December 1993) was a Dutch Sinologist and scholar best known for his studies of ancient Chinese law, particularly that of the Han dynasty (220 BC – AD 206).

== Life and career ==
Anthony François Paulus Hulsewé was born on 31 January 1910 in Berlin, Germany, where his father worked for a German firm as an electrical engineer. Hulsewé's family was from the Dutch province of Groningen and had traditionally been clergymen in the Dutch Reformed Church, though his grandfather chose to go into farming and business instead of church service. Hulsewé lived in Germany for the first several years of his life, but his parents became concerned about the increasing deprivations of World War I and sent him and his siblings back to the Netherlands to live with an aunt in Arnhem. Hulsewé's parents finally left Germany in 1919, and the family settled in Bussum, a small town about 15 miles (24 km) east of Amsterdam.

During the early 20th century, the Dutch government offered national scholarships for university students to study Chinese and Japanese in order to ensure a supply of competent officials and administrators in the Dutch East Indies. After completing secondary school in 1927, Hulsewé took and passed the competitive examination for one of these scholarships, entering Leiden University in the autumn of 1928 to study Chinese under the Dutch Sinologist J. J. L. Duyvendak. His only classmate during his first year was Marius van der Valk (1908–1978), who studied Chinese and law, and later became a professor of modern Chinese law at Leiden.

Although the scholarships were intended to allow students to prepare to be colonial officials, Duyvendak required his students to intensively study Classical Chinese and the philological methods of Sinology. Duyvendak's Chinese assistant Chang T'ien-tse, a native of Fujian Province, provided them with instruction in modern Mandarin Chinese as well as some basic training in Hokkien Chinese, which was the language of most of the Chinese residents of the Dutch East Indies.

Hulsewé passed his Candidaats (equivalent to modern bachelor's degree) exam in 1931 and moved to Beijing to continue his studies. While in Beijing, Hulsewé's instructor in Classical Chinese was Liang Qixiong (梁啟雄; 1900–1965), a scholar and the younger brother of famed Chinese writer Liang Qichao. Hulsewé's former classmate Marius van der Valk encouraged him to study Chinese legal history, and so in 1932 Hulsewé began the large work of producing a fully annotated translation of the Tang dynasty legal codes contained in the "Monograph on Norms and Punishments" (xíngfǎ zhì 刑法志) sections of the Old Book of Tang and the New Book of Tang.

In late 1934, Hulsewé moved to Kyoto, Japan, where he divided his time between intensively studying Japanese and continuing his work on the Tang legal system under a Japanese scholar. In 1935, Hulsewé moved to Batavia (modern Jakarta, Indonesia) to take up a position in the Dutch Bureau of East Asian Affairs, where his job was mainly to gather political information from Chinese and Japanese newspapers. He briefly returned to the Netherlands in 1939, where he passed his master's degree examination and submitted the first part of his "Monograph on Norms and Punishments" as his M.A. thesis. Shortly after his return to Batavia, in 1942 the Japanese invaded the island of Java. Hulsewé was made a prisoner of war and transferred to Singapore, where he was held until the end of World War II.

In 1946, after the end of the war, Hulsewé returned to the Netherlands, where Duyvendak offered him a position as a lecturer in Chinese at Leiden, which he accepted. Shortly after taking up the position, Hulsewé's work on Tang legal history was preempted by the German scholar Karl Bünger's publication of a book on the subject, Quellen zur Rechtsgeschichte der T'ang-Zeit, and Hulsewé abandoned working on the project. Duyvendak was interested in focusing Chinese scholarship at Leiden on to the Han dynasty, and so Hulsewé began working on the legal history of that era. He did a large study as a Ph.D. dissertation, which was later published in 1955 as Remnants of Han Law, Volume 1: Introductory Studies and an Annotated Translation of Chapters 22 and 23 of the History of the Former Han Dynasty.

Following Duyvendak's death in 1954, Hulsewé was chosen in 1956 to succeed him as Professor of Chinese at Leiden, a position he held until his retirement in 1975. Hulsewé and his second wife Marguerite Wazniewski then settled in Romont, Switzerland, where Hulsewé continued his research and writing in retirement. He died of a heart attack on 16 December 1993, aged 83.

== Selected works ==
- Hulsewé, A.F.P. (1955). Remnants of Han Law, Volume 1: Introductory Studies and an Annotated Translation of Chapters 22 and 23 of the History of the Former Han Dynasty. Sinica Leidensia. Vol. 9. Leiden: Brill.
- ——— (1957). "Han-time Documents: A Survey of Recent Studies Occasioned by the Finding of Han-time Documents in Central Asia". T'oung Pao. 45: 1–50. doi:10.1163/156853257X00017.
- ——— (1975). "The Problem of the Authenticity of Shih-chi Chapter 123, the Memoir on Ta Yüan". T'oung Pao. 61: 83–147. doi:10.1163/156853275X00026.
- ——— (1979). China in Central Asia, the Early Stage: 125 B.C. – A.D. 23, an Annotated Translation of Chapters 61 and 96 of the History of the Former Han Dynasty. Sinica Leidensia. Vol. 14. Leiden: Brill.
- ——— (1979). "A Lawsuit of A.D. 28". In Bauer, W. (ed.). Studia Sino-mongolica – Festschrift für Herbert Franke. Wiesbaden: Steiner Verlag. pp. 23–34.
- ——— (1985). Remnants of Ch'in Law: An Annotated Translation of the Ch'in Legal and Administrative Rules of the 3rd Century B.C., Discovered in Yun-meng Prefecture, Hu-pei Province, in 1975. Sinica Leidensia. Vol. 17. Leiden: Brill.
- ——— (1986). "Ch'in and Han Law". In Twitchett, Denis; Loewe, Michael (eds.). The Cambridge History of China, Volume 1: The Ch'in and Han Empire. Cambridge: Cambridge University Press. pp. 520–544.
