= Henri Cordier =

French linguist, historian, ethnographer, author, editor and Orientalist

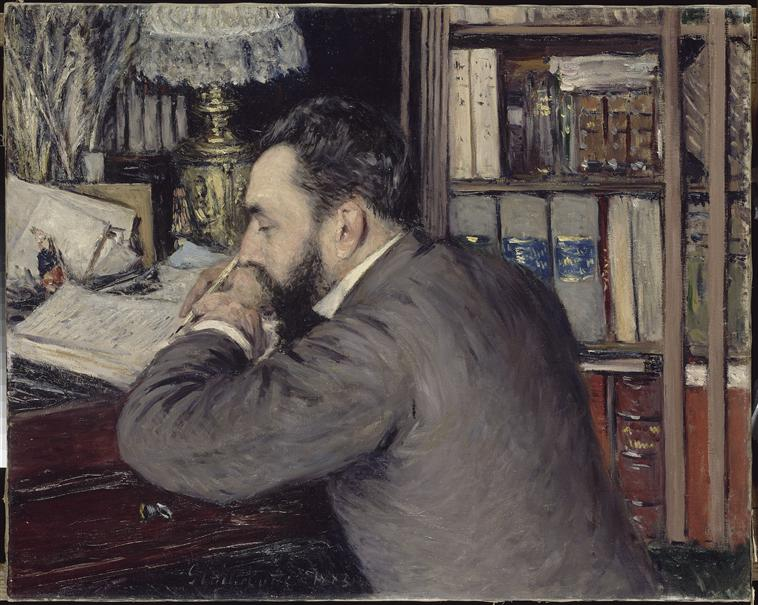
- Portrait of Henri Cordier at work, by Gustave Caillebotte (1883)
- Born: 8 August 1849; New Orleans, Louisiana, United States
- Died: 16 March 1925 (aged 75); Paris, France
- Known for: East Asian studies

Henri Cordier (8 August 1849 – 16 March 1925) was a French linguist, historian, ethnographer, author, editor and Orientalist. He was President of the Société de Géographie (French, "Geographical Society") in Paris. Cordier was a prominent figure in the development of East Asian and Central Asian scholarship in Europe in the late 19th and early 20th century. Though he had little actual knowledge of the Chinese language, Cordier had a particularly strong impact on the development of Chinese scholarship, and was a mentor of the noted French sinologist Édouard Chavannes.

== Early life ==
Cordier was born in New Orleans, Louisiana in the United States. He arrived in France in 1852; and his family moved to Paris in 1855. He was educated at the Collège Chaptal and in England.

In 1869 at age 20, he sailed for Shanghai, where he worked at an English bank. During the next two years, he published several articles in local newspapers. In 1872, he was made librarian of the North China branch of the Royal Asiatic Society. In this period, about twenty articles were published in Shanghai Evening Courier, North China Daily News, and Journal of the North China Branch of the Royal Asiatic Society.

== Career ==
In 1876, he was named secretary of a Chinese government program for Chinese students studying in Europe.

In Paris, Cordier was a professor at l'École spéciale des Langues orientales, which is known today as the Institute of Oriental Languages and Civilizations (L'Institut national des langues et civilisations orientales, INALCO). He joined the faculty in 1881; and he was a professor from 1881 to 1925. He contributed a number of articles to the Catholic Encyclopedia.

Cordier was also a professeur at l'École Libre des Sciences Politiques, which is today known as the National Foundation of Political Studies (Fondation Nationale des Sciences Politiques) and the Paris Institute of Political Studies (Institut d'Etudes Politiques de Paris).

== Contributions to Sinology ==
Although he had only a slight knowledge of the language, Cordier made major contributions to Sinology.

"Cordier," as the Bibliotheca Sinica "is sometimes affectionately referred to," is "the standard enumerative bibliography" of 70,000 works on China up to 1921. Even though the author did not know Chinese, he was thorough and highly familiar with European publications. Endymion Wilkinson also praises Cordier for including the full titles, often the tables of contents, and reviews of most books.

Cordier was a founding editor of T'oung Pao, which was the first international journal of Chinese Studies. Along with Gustaaf Schlegel, he helped to establish the prominent sinological journal T'oung Pao in 1890.

== Honors ==
- Royal Asiatic Society, honorary member, 1893.
- Royal Geographical Society, corresponding member, 1908.
- Académie des inscriptions et belles-lettres, member, 1908.
- Société Asiatique, vice-president, 1918–1925.
- Société de Géographie, President, 1924–1925.

== Selected works ==
Cordier's published writings encompass 1,033 works in 1,810 publications in 13 languages and 7,984 library holdings.

- A Narrative of the Recent Events in Tong-King (1875)
- Bibliotheca sinica. Dictionnaire bibliographique des ouvrages relatifs à l'Empire chinois, Vol. 1; Vol. 2. (1878-1895)
- Bibliographie des œuvres de Beaumarchais (1883)
- La France en Chine au XVIIIe siècle: documents inédits/publiés sur les manuscrits conservés au dépôt des affaires étrangères, avec une introduction et des notes (1883)
- Mémoire sur la Chine adressé à Napoléon Ier: mélanges, Vol. 1; Vol. 2; by F. Renouard de Ste-Croix, edited by Henri Cordier. (1895-1905)
- Les Origines de deux établissements français dans l'Extrême-Orient: Chang-Haï, Ning-Po, documents inédits, publiés, avec une introduction et des notes (1896)
- La Révolution en Chine: les origines (1900)
- Conférence sur les relations de la Chine avec l'Europe. (1901)
- L'Imprimerie sino-européenne en Chine: bibliographie des ouvrages publiés en Chine par les Européens au XVIIe et au XVIIIe siècle. (1901)
- Dictionnaire bibliographique des ouvrages relatifs à l'Empire chinois: bibliotheca sinica, Vol. 1; Vol. 2; Vol. 3; Vol. 4. (1904-1907)
- The Book of Ser Marco Polo : vol.1 The Book of Ser Marco Polo : vol.2 with Henry Yule (1903)
- Ser Marco Polo : vol.1 (1910)
- L'Expédition de Chine de 1860, histoire diplomatique, notes et documents (1906)
- Bibliotheca Indosinica. Dictionnaire bibliographique des ouvrages relatifs à la péninsule indochinoise (1912)
- Bibliotheca Japonica. Dictionnaire bibliographique des ouvrages relatifs à l'empire Japonais rangés par ordre chronologique jusqu'à 1870 (1912)
- Mémoires Concernant l'Asie Orientale : vol.1 Mémoires Concernant l'Asie Orientale : vol.2 Mémoires Concernant l'Asie Orientale : vol.3 (1913)
- Le Voyage à la Chine au XVIIIe siècle. Extrait du journal de M. Bouvet, commandant le vaisseau de la Compagnie des Indes le Villevault (1765-1766) (1913)
- Cathay and the Way Thither: being a Collection of Medieval Notices of China (1913)
- Bibliographie stendhalienne (1914)
- La Suppression de la compagnie de Jésus et la mission de Péking (1918)
- The travels of Marco Polo (1920), with Henry Yule
- Histoire générale de la Chine et de ses relations avec les pays étrangers: depuis les temps les plus anciens jusqu'à la chute de la dynastie Mandchoue, Vol. I, Depuis les temps les plus anciens jusqu'à la chute de la dynastie T'ang (907); Vol. 2, Depuis les cinq dynasties (907) jusqu'à la chute des Mongols (1368); Vol. 3, Depuis l'avènement des Mings (1368) jusqu'à la mort de Kia K'ing (1820); Vol. 4, Depuis l'avènement de Tao Kouang (1821) jusqu'à l'époque actuelle. (1920-1921)
- La Chine. (1921)
- La Chine en France au XVIIIe siècle (Paris, 1910)
- Chine : vol.1
