= Édouard Chavannes =

French sinologist (1865–1918)

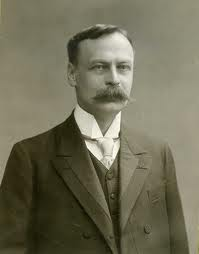
- Born: 5 October 1865; Lyon, France
- Died: 29 January 1918 (aged 52); Paris, France
- Spouse: Alice Dor (m. 1891–1918)
- Scientific career
- Fields: Chinese history, Chinese religion
- Workplaces: Collège de France
- Academic advisors: Henri Cordier; Marquis d'Hervey-Saint-Denys
- Notable students: Paul Demiéville, Marcel Granet, Henri Maspero, Paul Pelliot

Chinese name
- Chinese: 沙畹
Transcriptions
Standard Mandarin
- Hanyu Pinyin: Shā Wǎn

Émmanuel-Édouard Chavannes (Note: Birth name as given in Noël Péri's obituary of Chavannes.) (5 October 1865 – 29 January 1918) was a French sinologist and expert on Chinese history and religion, and is best known for his translations of major segments of Sima Qian's Records of the Grand Historian, the work's first ever translation into a Western language.

Chavannes was a prolific and influential scholar, and was one of the most accomplished Sinologists of the modern era notwithstanding his relatively early death at age 52 in 1918. A successor of 19th century French sinologists Jean-Pierre Abel-Rémusat and Stanislas Julien, Chavannes was largely responsible for the development of Sinology and Chinese scholarship into a respected field in the realm of French scholarship.

== Life and career ==
Chavannes was born on 5 October 1865 in Lyon, France. As a youth he studied at the lycée in Lyon, where, like most students of his era, his education focused mainly on the Latin and Greek classics. Chavannes was then sent to Paris to attend the prestigious Lycée Louis-le-Grand, where he and his classmates studied and prepared for the entrance exams to one of the French Grandes Écoles. Chavannes passed his entrance exams and was admitted to the Lettres ("literature") section of the École Normale Supérieure in 1885. Chavannes spent three years at the school, finishing in 1888 after successfully passing his agrégation in philosophy.

Georges Perrot, a French archaeologist and newly appointed director of the École Normale Supérieure, advised Chavannes to begin studying China after he finished his schooling. Chavannes first considered studying Chinese philosophy, which was nearer to his own educational background, but on the advice of the French scholar Henri Cordier he ultimately decided to focus on Chinese history, which up to that time had been much less widely studied in the West. Chavannes began attending Classical Chinese courses given by the Marquis d'Hervey-Saint-Denys at the Collège de France and the Mandarin Chinese classes of Maurice Jametel (1856–1889) at the École des Langues Orientales Vivantes (School of Living Oriental Languages). Desiring to advance his studies with actual experience in China, Chavannes used the connections of certain friends of his to obtain a position as an attaché to a scientific mission associated with the French Legation in Peking (modern Beijing). He departed for China in January 1889 and arrived two months later. As a sinologist, Chavannes took the Chinese name Sha Wan (沙畹) and the courtesy name Zilan (滋蘭), and he also had an art name Shicheng Boshi (獅城博士, "The Doctor of Lyon").

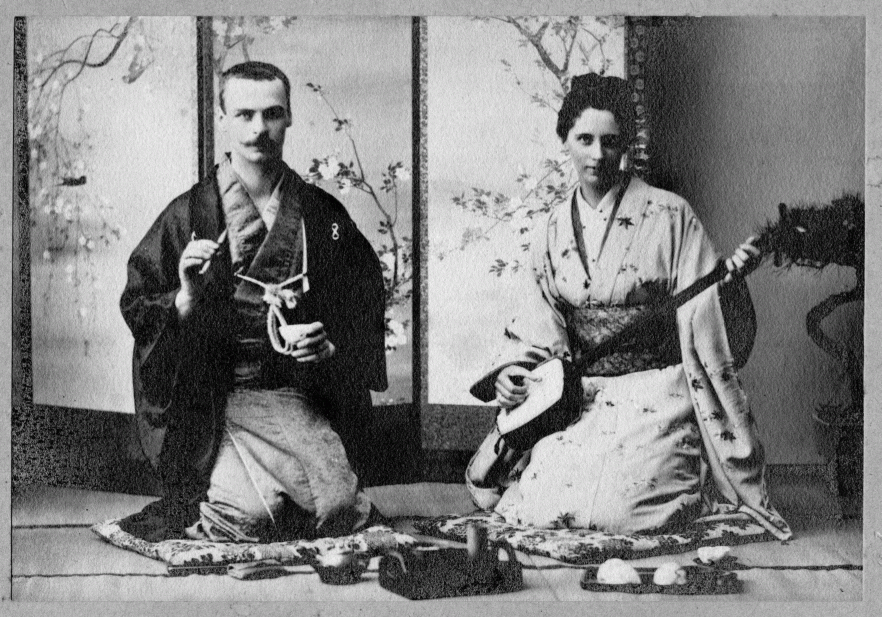
Chavannes and his wife, Alice Dor, during trip to Japan, c. 1892

In 1891, Chavannes briefly returned to France where he married Alice Dor, the daughter of a well-known optometrist in Lyon, before returning to China with her. Together they had a son, Fernand Henri Chavannes, who later became a highly decorated flying ace during World War I, and two daughters. Isabelle Chavennes became one of the first women engineers in France. Their children were educated at The Cooperative, an informal group of French academics organised by Marie Curie in 1907 to teach their children in a more flexible way than was available in Paris at the time. Chavannes taught the small group of children Chinese, and Alice Chavennes taught them English and German. Their pupils included Irène Joliot-Curie. Isabelle's notes are the only extant record of the school's curriculum.

Chavannes stayed in China until 1893, when he returned to France to take up the position of Professor of Chinese at the Collège de France, which had been vacated upon the death of the Marquis d'Hervey-Saint-Denys in November 1892. Although Chavannes had only been studying Chinese for five years, the quality and value of his early Chinese scholarship had already been widely recognized in the academic community, and convinced the regents of the Collège de France to give the position to him. Chavannes opened his tenure with a lecture entitled "Du Rôle social de la littérature chinoise" ("On the Social Role of Chinese Literature"). During his tenure at the Collège, Chavannes was widely active in French academic circles: he was a member of the Institut de France, was an honorary member of a number of foreign societies, served as a French co-editor of the noted sinological journal T'oung Pao from 1904 until 1916, and was elected President of the Academie des Inscriptions et Belles-Lettres in 1915.

Chavannes's granddaughter Claire Chavannes had a son with physicist Paul Langevin's grandson Bernard Langevin : the French mathematician Rémi Langevin.

== Scholarship ==
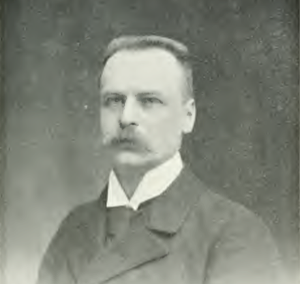
Chavannes (c. 1905)

=== History ===
Chavannes' first scholarly publication, "Le Traité sur les sacrifices Fong et Chan de Se-ma Ts'ien, traduit en français" ("Sima Qian's Treatise on the Feng and Shan Sacrifices, Translated into French"), which was published in 1890 while he was in Beijing, inspired him to begin a translation of Sima Qian's Records of the Grand Historian, the first of China's dynastic histories. The first volume of the translation was published in Paris in 1895, and begins with a 249-page introduction which the German anthropologist Berthold Laufer described as "a masterpiece of historical and critical analysis... not surpassed by anything of this character written before or after him." Chavannes produced four additional volumes between 1896 and 1905, covering 47 of the 130 chapters of the Records and complete with full commentary and indices. His translations also include a large number of appendices covering topics of special interests.

=== Epigraphy ===
Chavannes was major pioneer in the field of modern epigraphy, and was praised by Berthold Laufer as "the first European scholar who approached this difficult subject with sound and critical methods and undisputed success." His first epigraphical article, "Les Inscriptions des Ts'in" ("Qin Inscriptions"), was published in Journal Asiatique in 1893, which was followed later by a number of works in which Chavannes was the first Western scholar to successfully analyze and translate the unusual epigraphical style of the Mongol-ruled Yuan dynasty. Chavannes returned to China in 1907 to study ancient monuments and inscriptions, taking hundreds of photographs and rubbings that were published in 1909 in a large album entitled Mission archéologique dans la Chine septentrionale (Archaeological Mission to Northern China). He published two volumes of translations and analysis of the inscription material before his death: La Sculpture à l'époque des Han (Sculpture in the Han Era), published in 1913, and La Sculpture bouddhique (Buddhist Sculpture), published in 1915.

=== Religion ===
Chavannes was intrigued by and performed extensive research into the major religions of ancient and medieval China: Chinese folk religion, Buddhism, Daoism, Nestorian Christianity, and Manichaeism. His Mémoire composé à l'époque de la grande dynastie T'ang sur les religieux éminents qui allèrent chercher la loi dans les pays d'occident par I-Tsing (Memoir Written in the Grand Tang Dynasty by Yijing on the Religious Men Who Went to Search for the Law in the Western Lands), which was published in 1894 and won the Prix Julien, contains translations of the biographies and travelogues of sixty Buddhist monks who journeyed from China to India during the Tang dynasty in search of Buddhist scriptures and Sanskrit books. Chavannes' best-known work on Chinese Buddhism is his three-volume work Cinq cents contes et apologues extraits du Tripiṭaka chinois (Five Hundred Tales and Fables from the Chinese Tripiṭaka).

Chavannes' 1910 book Le T'ai Chan, essai de monographie d'un culte chinois (Tai Shan: Monographic Essay on a Chinese Religion), is a detailed study of the indigenous Chinese folk religion, which predates Buddhism and religious Daoism, and focuses on an ancient mountain cult centered on Mt. Tai that Chavannes visited personally. This monumental work begins with introductory essays on the generally sacred role of mountains in Chinese history and culture, then examines the personality of Mt. Tai itself in great detail. Chavannes includes translations of dozens of relevant passages from ancient, medieval, and pre-modern Chinese literature, including comments and passages gathered by medieval scholars Zhu Xi and Gu Yanwu. His study also includes eleven translations from rubbings of stone inscriptions Chavannes made himself in temples he visited on and around Mt. Tai, as well as a detailed hand-drawn topographic map of the mountain that Chavannes drew himself. Chavannes' style in Le T'ai Chan, with his annotated translations, extensive commentary, and exhaustively researched sources was inspirational and influential to later French sinologists.

In 1912, Chavannes and his former student Paul Pelliot edited and translated a Chinese Manichaean treatise that Pelliot had discovered among the Dunhuang manuscripts in the Mogao caves. The book, published in Paris as Un traité manichéen retrouvé en Chine (A Manichaean Treatise Found in China), was praised by Berthold Laufer upon Chavannes' death in 1918 as "perhaps the most brilliant achievement in modern sinology."

== Selected works ==
- (in French) Chavannes, Édouard (1890). "Le Traité sur les sacrifices Fong et Chan de Se-ma Ts'ien, traduit en français" ("Sima Qian's Treatise on the Feng and Shan Sacrifices, Translated into French"). Journal of the Peking Oriental Society.
- (in French) – – – (1893). La Sculpture sur pierre en Chine au temps des deux dynasties Han (Stone Sculpture in China during the Han dynasty).
- (in French) – – – (1894). Mémoire composé à l'époque de la grande dynastie T'ang sur les religieux éminents qui allèrent chercher la loi dans les pays d'occident par I-Tsing (Memoir Written in the Grand Tang Dynasty by I-Tsing on the Religious Men Who Went to Search for the Law in the Western Lands).
- (in French) – – – (1895–1905). Les Mémoires historiques de Se-ma Ts'ien traduits et annotés (The Historical Memoirs of Sima Qian, Translated and Annotated), 5 vols.
- (in French) – – – (1902). Dix inscriptions chinoises de l'Asie centrale (Ten Chinese Inscriptions From Central Asia).
- (in French) – – – (1903). Documents sur les Tou-kiue (Turks) occidentaux (Documents on the Western Turks).
- (in French) – – – (1910). Le T'ai Chan, essai de monographie d'un culte chinois (Tai Shan: Monographic Essay on a Chinese Cult).
- (in French) – – – (1910–1911). Cinq cents contes et apologues extraits du Tripiṭaka chinois (Five Hundred Tales and Fables Extracted from the Chinese Tripiṭaka), 3 vols. (A fourth volume, containing notes and indices, was published posthumously.)
- (in French) (1913) Mission archéologique dans la Chine septentrionale : vol. 1 Mission archéologique dans la Chine septentrionale : vol. 2 Mission archéologique dans la Chine septentrionale : vol. 3 Mission archéologique dans la Chine septentrionale : vol.4 Mission archéologique dans la Chine septentrionale : vol.5
