= Gustaaf Schlegel =

Dutch sinologist and field naturalist

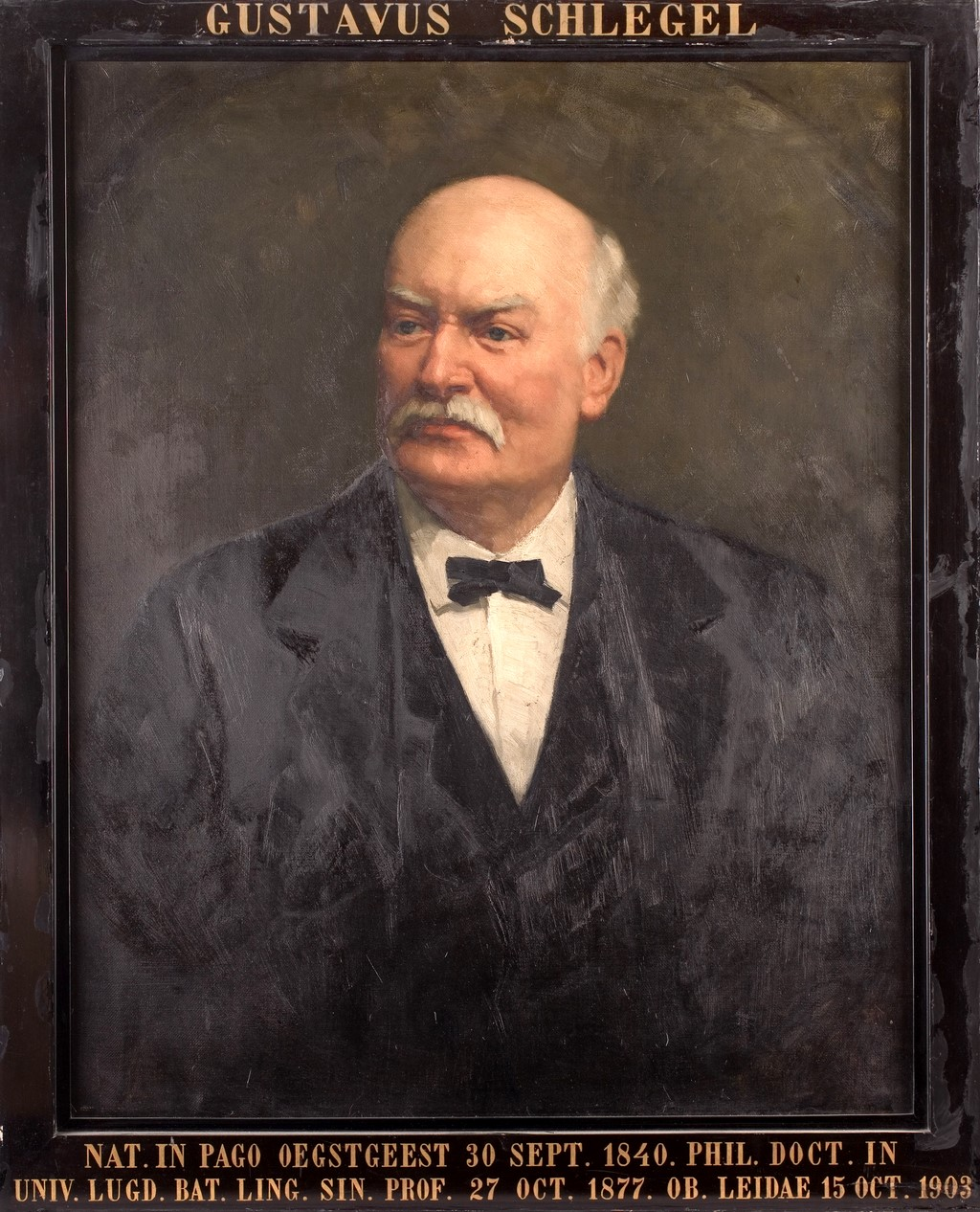
- Portrait of Schlegel by Thérèse Schwartze
- Born: 30 September 1840; Oegstgeest, Netherlands
- Died: 15 October 1903 (aged 63); Leiden, Netherlands
- Known for: Chinese-Dutch dictionary; founding editor of T'oung Pao
- Scientific career
- Institutions: Leiden University
- Notable students: J.J.M. de Groot

Chinese name
- Chinese: 施古德
Transcriptions
Standard Mandarin
- Hanyu Pinyin: Shī Gǔdé
- Wade–Giles: Shih^{1} Ku^{3}-te^{2}
Yue: Cantonese
- Yale Romanization: Sī Gú-dāk
Southern Min
- Hokkien POJ: Si Kóo-tik

Gustaaf Schlegel (30 September 1840 – 15 October 1903) was a Dutch sinologist and field naturalist.

== Life and career ==
Gustaaf Schlegel was born on 30 September 1840 in Oegstgeest. The son of Hermann Schlegel—a native of Saxony who had moved to the Netherlands in 1827 to work at the natural history museum of Leiden and became its second director—Gustaaf begun to study Chinese at the age of 9 with Leiden japanologist J. J. Hoffmann initially, it seems, without the knowledge of his parents. Gustaaf made his first trip to China in 1857 in order to collect bird specimens, but his notoriety as naturalist was overshadowed by that of Robert Swinhoe who completed much field work in China ahead of Schlegel.

In 1861, after having learned the Fuzhou dialect, he moved to Canton to study Cantonese. In 1862, Schlegel took a job as an interpreter for the supreme court of the colonial government of Batavia. While working on this job, in 1866 he published a monograph on the Tiandihui (Heaven and Earth Society), the first on the topic in Dutch, and another one on prostitution in Canton. In 1869 he was awarded a doctorate from the University of Jena; his thesis was on the customs and pastimes of the Chinese, but this writing was apparently a formality because his reputation had been established by his previous publications.

Schlegel fell seriously ill in 1872 and was granted two years' sick leave to Holland. On his return, Hoffmann met him and asked Schlegel to take his place in educating Dutch-Chinese translators. Schlegel accepted, and in 1873 he pursued the matter further writing a pro domo letter to the Colonial Minister, asking for the government to establish a university position. He was successful, and in 1875 was appointed as an "extraordinary professor" of Chinese at Leiden University, on the first position of its kind, and advanced to full professor in 1877. In 1873 he became correspondent of the Royal Netherlands Academy of Arts and Sciences, he resigned four years later, in 1877. In 1888 he became member of the academy once more.

In 1878 he married Catharina Elisabeth Gezina Buddingh. They had no children and divorced in 1890. The last years of his life were significantly affected by diabetes, as a result of which he lost sight in both eyes. He was elected an International Member of the American Philosophical Society in 1899. He retired in 1902 and died next year. His chair at Leiden remained vacant until 1904 when Jan Jakob Maria de Groot accepted the position.

== Works and legacy ==
Schlegel's 1866 monograph on the Heaven and Earth Society is considered the major breakthrough in its study, even in 21st century scholarship. Schlegel was fortunate that he had access to secret writings that had been seized by the police. Its impact extended beyond Dutch colonies; it was frequently cited in the writings of colonial officers in British Malaya as well.

Schlegel's magnum opus was his Dutch-Chinese dictionary, published in 4 volumes between 1882 and 1891. It won international acclaim, including the Prix Stanislas Julien (1887). Although the German press even bracketed this work in the same category of achievements as the Forth Bridge and the Eiffel Tower, it had little impact outside Dutch sinology. The publisher, Brill, had apparently printed more copies than were ever ordered, and these were shredded only in 1975. Despite Schlegel's pleas, Dutch did not become a language of international scientific exchange in his field. (C.F.M. de Grijs, a contemporary colleague of Schlegel is almost totally forgotten today because he only published in Dutch.)

Perhaps Schlegel's most lasting contribution is the founding in 1890, together with Henri Cordier, of the journal T'oung Pao, providing a joint publishing venue for the then leading Sinological centers of Europe. This journal has remained a leading Sinology journal to present times.

He is also credited for being the first European to amply document the Chinese origins of gunpowder.

Schlegel also wrote extensively on the geographical accounts found in Chinese historical texts like the Book of Liang. His articles on this theme were published in T'oung Pao, initially in French in a series entitled Problèmes Géographiques: Les Peuples Étrangers Chez Les Historiens Chinois, and later continued in English as Geographical Notes. The first article in this series was on Fusang. His articles on ancient Chinese geography were later collected and republished as standalone books.

The scientific name of the Pechora pipit Anthus gustavi was named after him by Robert Swinhoe, after Schlegel discovered it in Amoy (now Xiamen) in southeast China in the early 1860s.
