= Johannes Hoffmann (vascular surgeon) =

German physician (born 1968)

Johannes N. Hoffmann
- Known for: dialysis-shunt-surgery, hybrid surgery, endovascular procedures, postoperative management of coagulation, sepsis and ischemia
- Scientific career
- Fields: General Visceral and Vascular Surgery Emergency Medicine, Surgical Intensive Care Medicine
- Workplaces: University of Duisburg-Essen, Clinic for Vascular Surgery and Phlebology in Essen

Johannes Hoffmann (born 1968) is a German medical specialist in vascular surgery. Furthermore, he is professor and director of the clinic for vascular surgery and phlebology of the Elisabeth-Hospital Essen as well as head of the clinic for vascular surgery Essen. He is especially well known for his works on the key research areas of dialysis-shunt-surgery, hybrid surgery, endovascular procedures, postoperative management of coagulation, sepsis and ischemia.

== Biography ==
After Hoffmann had finished his simultaneous studies in the subjects transverse flute and human medicine at LMU Munich and the University of Music and Performing Arts Munich, he worked as doctor and scientist at the clinic for surgery and polyclinic of LMU Klinikum from 1995 until 2012. In 1996, he became scientific assistant at the surgical clinic of LMU Munich. From 1999 on he completed multiple research stays at the institute for clinical and experimental surgery of the Saarland University, where he had been senior physician as of 2003. In 2002 Hoffmann performed his first independent transplantations of kidney and pancreas. In 2003, he became specialist for surgery and received the additional title of surgical intensive care medicine and emergency medicine. From 2009 until 2011, he was deputy head of vascular surgery at the Klinikum Großhadern. In 2009, he became medical specialist for vascular surgery and received an extraordinary professorship at LMU Munich. In 2010, Hoffmann became medical specialist for visceral surgery and special visceral surgery. From 2011 until 2012, he led the visceral surgical science at LMU as well as the section of visceral surgery at LMU Munich as executive senior physician. In 2012, he awarded the title of endovascular surgeon (DGG) and was entrusted with the management of the newly established section of visceral surgery at the university hospital Essen. Since 2014 Hoffmann has been head of the clinic for vascular surgery and phlebology in Essen.

== Scientific contribution ==
Hoffmannscientifi work is focussed on ischemia Reperfusion Injury, Sepsis, Transplantation, vascular access surgery, bypass surgery, microperfusion in arteriosclerosis and diabetes. The focal areas of Hoffmann's scientific work as vascular surgeon are the endo-vascular aortic surgery and complex revision procedures. As an expert he is operating for the arbitration body of the medical association of Nordrhein, the arbitration body of the state chamber of medicine in Munich as well as for different courts. He is author of numerous publications and teaching book and co-editor of the journal "Gefäßchirurgie" (visceral surgery) and "Gefäßmedizin Scan" (vascular medicine scan).

== Awards ==
In 2000 the "Germany Society for Surgery" (DGCH) honored Hoffmann with the price for surgical intensive-care medicine. in 2006 he received “The young investigator award” awarded by the "European Society of Surgical Research". In 2008 he was co-recipient of the Rene van Dongen price of the "Germany Society for Visceral Surgery" (DGG).

== Memberships in scientific organizations ==
Hoffmann is member of the following scientific organizations among others: "European Society of Intensive Care Medicine", "The German Society for Surgery", "German Society for Visceral Surgery and General Surgery" (DGVS, DGVA) and the "European Endocrine Tumor Society (ENETS)".

== Publications ==
Johannes N Hoffmann, List of publications on ResearchGate

Hoffmann started his scientific work with a publication about the elimination of inflammatory mediators via hemofiltration in sepsis. In further studies he characterized the impact of natural coagulation inhibitors on microvascular vessel perfusion and capillary density. In addition he investigated the influence of coagulatory inhibitors on operative trauma and endotoxemia.

Most cited papers:

1. Hoffmann JN, Hartl WH, Deppisch R, Faist E, Jochum M, Inthorn D (1995): Hemofiltration in human sepsis: Evidence for elimination of immunomodulatory substances. Kidney Int 48:1563-1570, IF:7,91, 86 Cit.
2. Inthorn D, Hoffmann JN, Hartl WH, Mühlbayer D, Jochum M (1997): Antithrombin III supplementation in severe sepsis: beneficial effects on organ dysfunction. Shock 8:328-334, IF:2,61, 81 Cit.
3. Inthorn D, Hoffmann JN, Hartl WH, Mühlbayer D, Jochum M (1998): Effect of antithrombin III supplementation on inflammatory response in patients with severe sepsis. Shock 10:90-97, IF:2,61, 62 Cit.
4. Hoffmann JN, Vollmar B, Laschke MW, Inthorn D, Fertmann JP, Schildberg FW, Menger MD (2004): Microhemodynamic and cellular mechanisms of activated protein C action during endotoxemia. Crit Care Med 32:1011-1017, IF:6,33, 79 Cit.
5. Kienast J, Juers M, Wiedermann CJ, Hoffmann JN, Ostermann H, Strauss R, Keinecke HO, Warren BL, Opal SM for the KyberSept investigators: Treatment effects of high-dose antithrombin without heparin in patients with severe sepsis with or without disseminated intravascular coagulation. J Thromb Haemost 2006; 4:90-97, IF:5,73, 78 Cit.
6. Schick KS, Fertmann JM, Kauch KW, Hoffmann JN: Prothrombin complex concentrate in surgical patients: retrospective evaluation of vitamin K antagonist reversal and treatment of severe bleeding, Crit. Care 2009 13(6): R191. Epub. 2009 Nov. 30, IF:4,71, 46 Cit., 9,20/y
