= Johann Joseph Hoffmann =

German scholar (1805–1878)

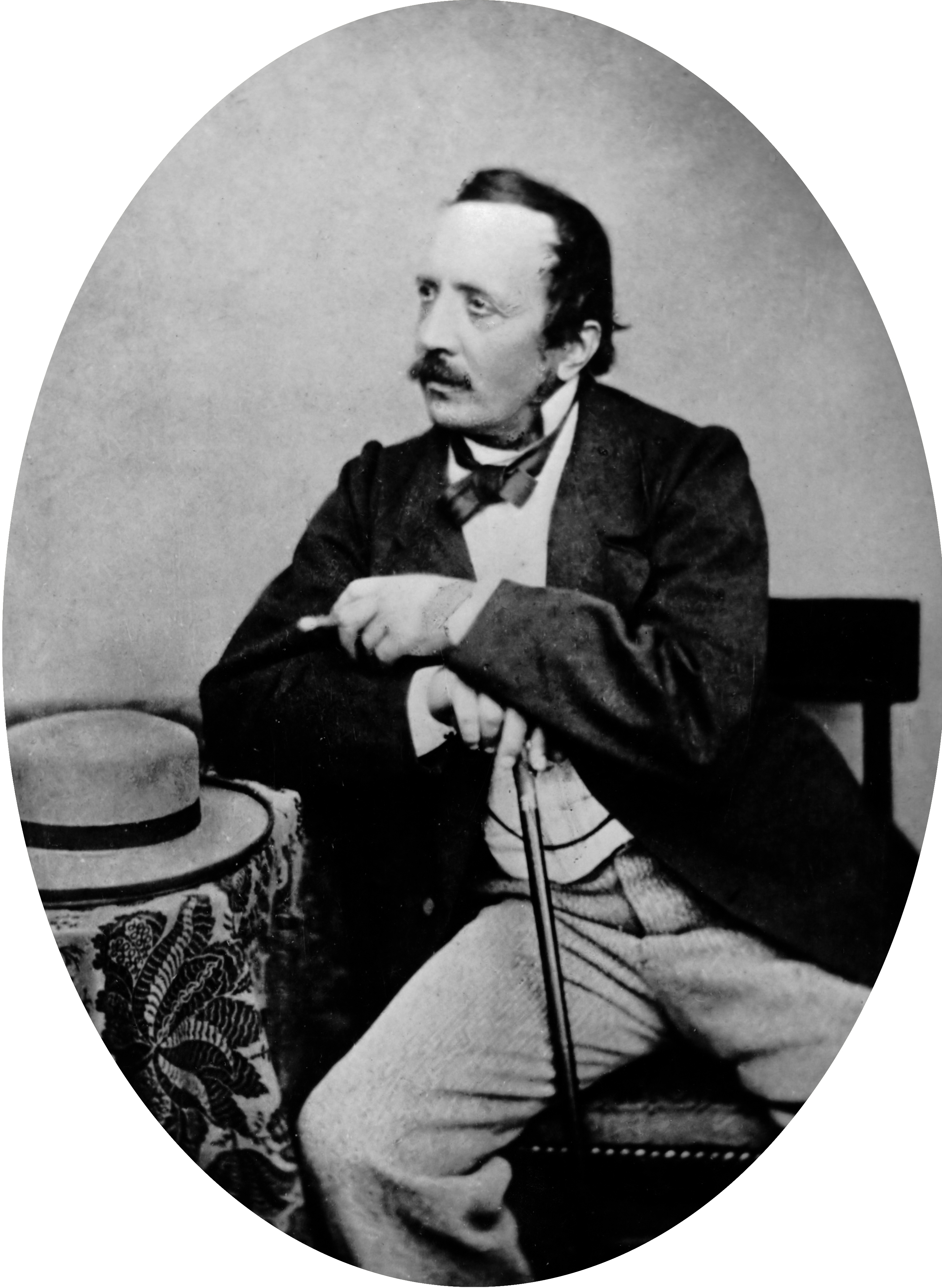
Johan Joseph Hoffmann

Johann Joseph Hoffmann (February 16, 1805 – January 19, 1878) was a German scholar who studied the Japanese and Chinese languages.

== Biography ==
Hoffmann was born at Würzburg in the Electorate of Bavaria. After studying at Würzburg, he went on the stage in 1825; but owing to an accidental meeting with the German traveller Philipp Franz von Siebold (1796–1866) in July 1830, his interest was diverted to Oriental philology. From Siebold he acquired the rudiments of Japanese, and in order to take advantage of the instructions of Ko-ching-chang, a Chinese teacher whom Siebold had brought home with him, he made himself acquainted with Malay, the only language except Chinese which Ko-ching-chang could understand.

In a few years he was able to supply the translations for Siebold's Nippon, and the high character of his work soon attracted the attention of older scholars. Stanislas Julien invited him to Paris, and he would probably have accepted the invitation, as a disagreement had broken out between him and Siebold, had not M. Baud, the Dutch colonial minister, appointed him Japanese translator with a salary of 1800 florins (£150).

== Works ==
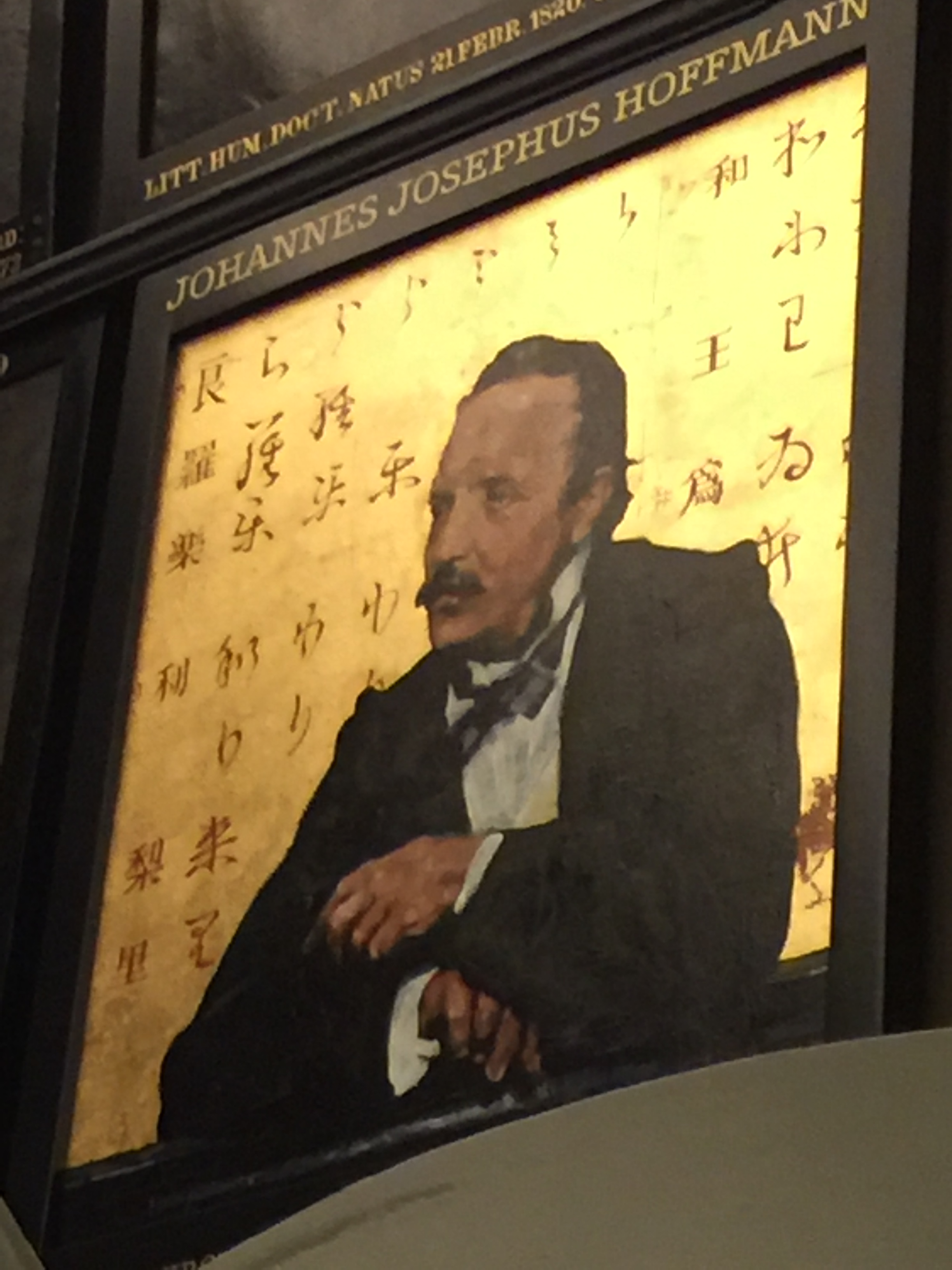
J. J. Hoffmann

The Dutch authorities were slow in giving him further recognition; and he was too modest a man successfully to urge his claims. It was not until after he had received the offer of the professorship of Chinese in King's College London, that the authorities made him professor at Leiden and the king allowed him a yearly pension. In 1875, he was decorated with the order of the Netherlands Lion, and in 1877 he was elected corresponding member of the Berlin Academy. He died at the Hague on 23 January 1878.

Hoffmann's chief work was his unfinished Japanese Dictionary begun in 1839 and afterwards continued by L. Serrurier. Unable at first to procure the necessary type, he set himself to the cutting of punches, and even when the proper founts were obtained he had to act as his own compositor as far as Chinese and Japanese were concerned. His Japanese grammar (Japanische Sprachlehre) was published in Dutch and English in 1867, and in English and German in 1876.

Of his miscellaneous productions it is enough to mention: “Japans Bezüge mit der koraischen Halbinsel und mit Schina,” in Nippon, vii.; Yo-San-fi-Rok, L'Art d'élever les vers à soie au Japon par Ouckaki Mourikouni (Paris, 1848); “Die Heilkunde in Japan” in Mittheil. d. deutsch. Gesellsch. für Natur- und Völkerk. Ost-Asiens (1873–1874); and Japanische Studien (1878).
