= Johannes Hoffmann von Schweidnitz =

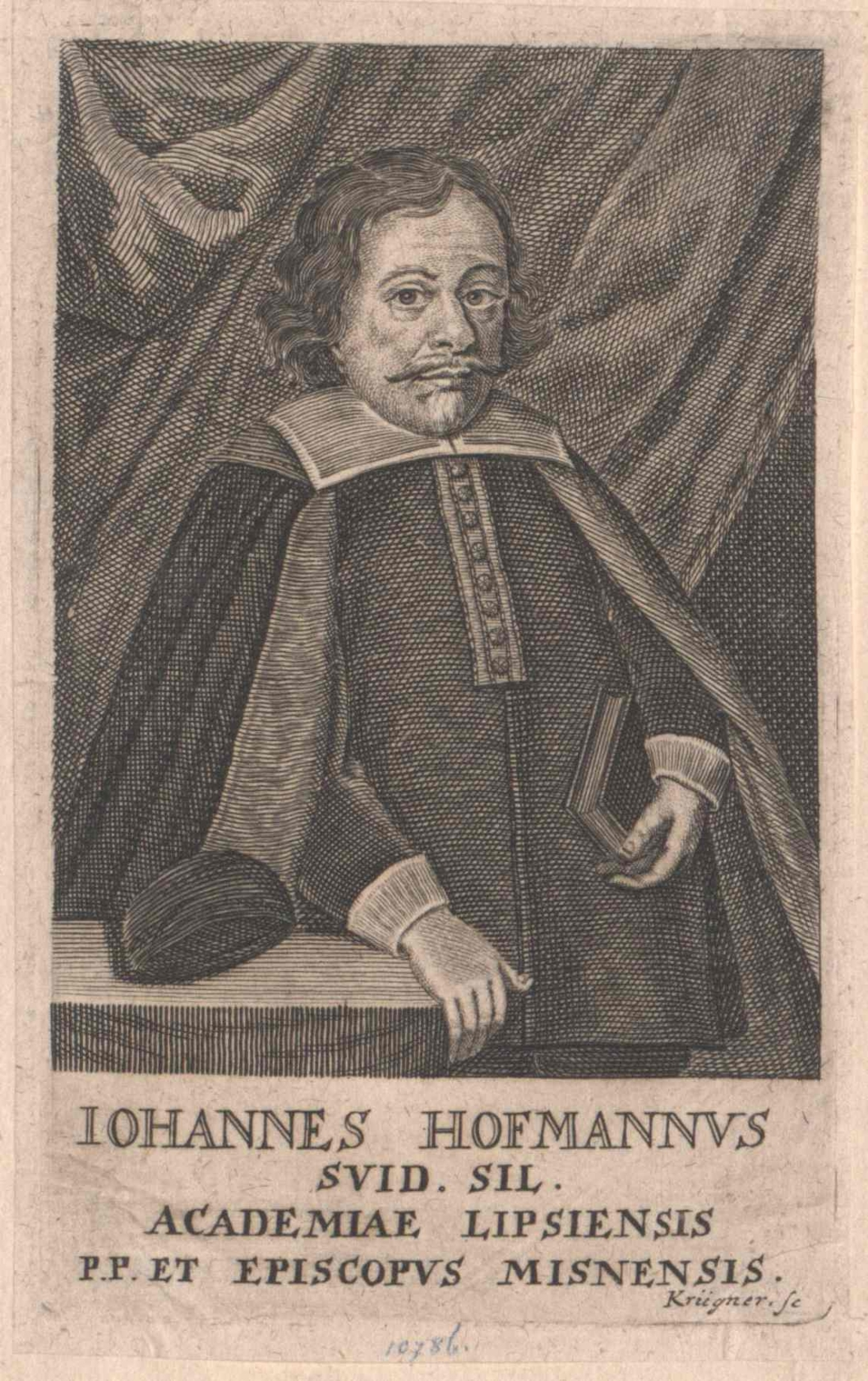
Johannes Hoffmann v Schweidnitz, later Johann IV, Bishop of Meissen

Johannes Hoffmann von Schweidnitz (also: Johann Hoffmann; Latin: Iohannes Hoffmanus Svidnicensis; Czech: Jan Hofman ze Svídnice; c. 1375 – 15 April 1451) was a Roman Catholic theologian, Professor of Theology and Rector at both Prague and Leipzig Universities, and served as Bishop of Meissen from 1427 until his death.

== Life ==
Johannes Hoffmann von Schweidnitz was born around 1375 in Schweidnitz, Duchy of Schweidnitz. He began theology studies at Prague University in 1393. In 1396 he earned a baccalaureate and four years later licentiate. A little later he achieved a magister degree. In 1408 he was dean of the Faculty of Arts and by 1409 had become rector of the university. In that year, the Jan Hus crisis developed, culminating in the Decree of Kutná Hora. As a result, Hoffmann organized, with Johannes Otto von Münsterberg, the exodus of German students from the University of Prague to the city of Leipzig. Somewhere between 5,000 and 20,000 German doctors, masters, and students left, and the reputation of Prague University was severely damaged.

Johannes Otto von Münsterberg became the rector of Leipzig University and Hoffmann became co-founder and Professor of Theology in the so-called Princes College. During the summer semester of 1413 Hoffmann was elected Rector of the University. Around 1415, Hoffmann was also Canon at the Meissen Cathedral as well as Provost of the collegiate chapter in Großenhain. He participated in the Council of Constance from 1414 to 1418 which ended the Western Schism. After the death of his friend Johannes Münsterberg in 1422, he founded the "College of Our Lady" at Leipzig University specifically for Silesian professors.

In 1427 he was appointed as Johann IV, Bishop of Meissen. In this position he was considered wise and prudent, and led the diocese through difficult times of the Hussite Wars. He successfully ended the exemption with the Archbishopric of Magdeburg, which had existed since 1400. His philosophical and theological works identify him as loyal to papal scholars and an opponent of the Hussites.

He died in 1451 at the residence of the Bishops of Meissen, Burg Stolpen, and is buried at Meissen Cathedral. His grave slab of sandstone shows him drawing with the crook and raising his right hand in blessing.

== Writings ==
- Quaestionum theologicarum cum solutionibus liber
- De missae officio et actionibus omnibus ll. VI. ad Fridericum et Guilielmum fratres, Marchiones Misnenis
