= International Dunhuang Programme =

International archeology conservation effort

- Location: Secretariat at the British Library, London, England
- Established: 1994
- Branches: Centres at Beijing, Berlin, Dunhuang, Kyoto, Paris, and St Petersburg

Collection
- Size: Over 150,000 collection items from more than 40 institutions

Other information
- Website: idp.bl.uk

The International Dunhuang Programme (IDP), formerly the International Dunhuang Project, is an international collaboration dedicated to the digitisation, preservation and study of manuscripts, artefacts and visual materials from the central and eastern Silk Road, particularly those originating from the Western Chinese city of Dunhuang and the Mogao Caves.The programme provides free online access to digitised collections of manuscripts, printed texts, paintings, textiles and other artefacts held by partner institutions worldwide via its digital database on the IDP website. The IDP also supports scholarly research, conservation training and public engagement related to Silk Road heritage to promote understandings of the history and cultures of those regions.

The programme was established by the British Library in 1994, and now includes over forty institutions in fifteen countries and territories. The seven founding partners are the Bibliothèque nationale de France, the Berlin-Brandenburg Academy of Sciences, the British Library, the Dunhuang Research Academy, the Institute of Oriental Manuscripts of the Russian Academy of Sciences, the National Library of China and Ryukoku University. As of 1 January 2026 the online IDP database comprised 154,919 catalogue entries, 114,332 of which have been digitised. Most of the manuscripts in the IDP database are texts written in Chinese, but more than twenty different scripts and languages are represented, including Brahmi, Kharosthi, Khotanese, Sanskrit, Tangut, Tibetan, Tocharian and Old Uyghur. These collections represent a valuable resource to scholars worldwide.

Stephen F. Teiser, the D. T. Suzuki Professor in Buddhist Studies and Professor of Religion at Princeton University has said that the IDP “is filling a huge gap in the research, teaching and knowledge-production industry. The international orientation of the project means that all objects are completely accessible to all people who have internet access, and that’s a tremendous advantage.”

As part of the events to mark the 30th anniversary of the IDP in 2024, a new name, International Dunhuang Programme (rather than Project), was adopted.

== Activities ==
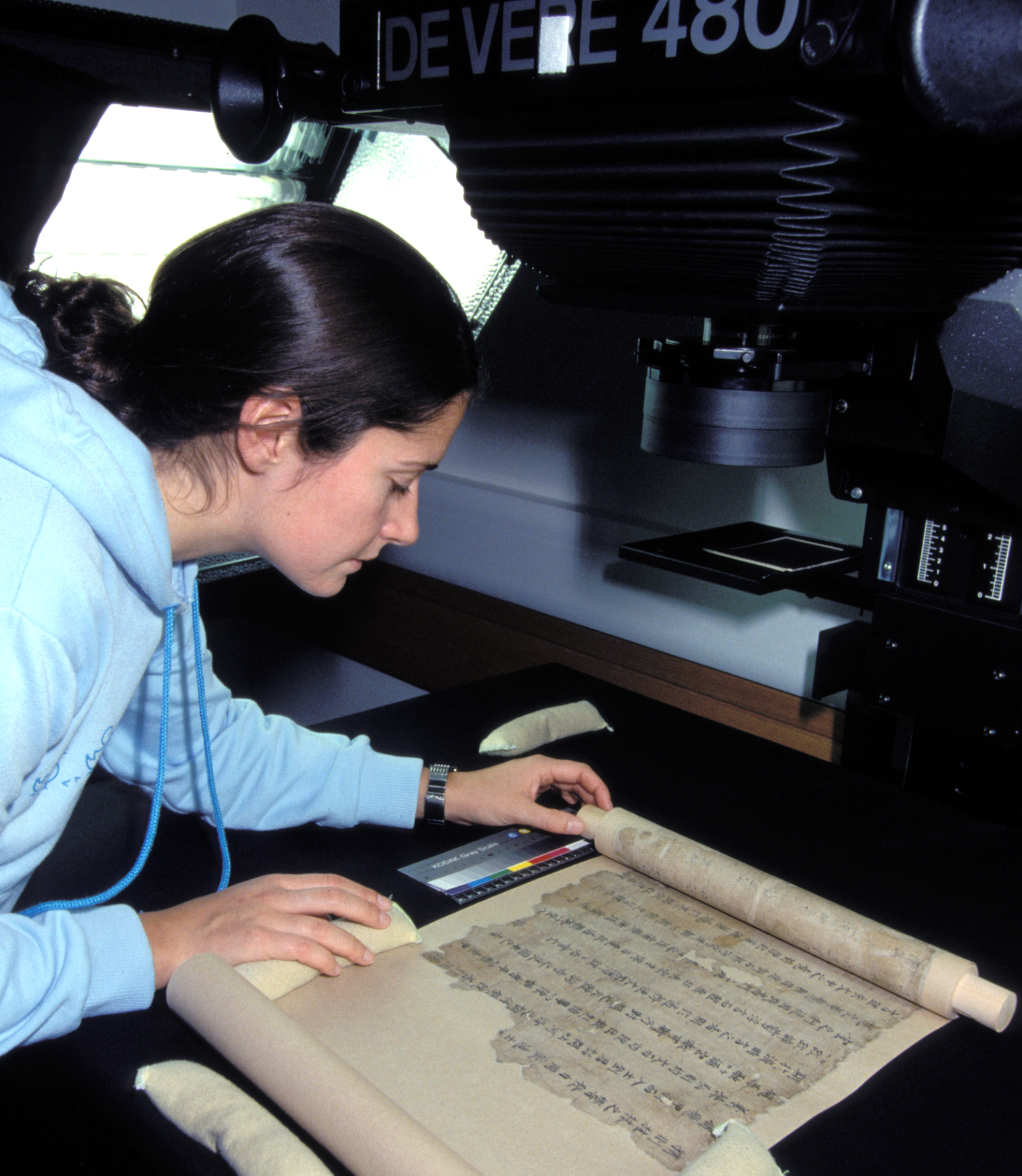
Digitisation at the British Library of the Rabbit Garden Imperial Book Repository 兔園策府, a Tang dynasty manuscript from Dunhuang

The main activities of the IDP are the conserving, cataloguing, and digitising of manuscripts, woodblock prints, paintings, textiles, photographs and other artefacts in the collections material from Dunhuang and other Eastern Silk Road sites held by participating institutions.

High-quality digital images of these materials are made available public through the IDP website, allowing researchers and the public to view and study fragile items without physically handling them. Scholars are still able to visit the objects in person at their respective holding institutions if they have a valid research justification and adhere to each institution’s specific requirements for on-site visits.

Victor H. Mair, Professor of Chinese Language and Literature at the University of Pennsylvania, has noted that there are many advantages of the IDP providing high resolution digital images of Dunhuang manuscripts online for access to all. Whereas in years gone by scholars often needed to travel long distances to access the original manuscripts, or could only access them by means of low quality reproductions, now anyone can access images from the convenience of their computer, wherever they are in the world. This not only makes research into these manuscripts easier, but helps in their conservation as there is far less need for them to be handled in person. Moreover, the high quality images provided by the IDP often show up details that would be difficult to see with the human eye. Some items have been imaged using multi-spectral imaging or high magnification, and these images are often published on the item’s online record.

In 2002, Lynne Brindley, former Chief Executive Officer of the British Library, put forward the IDP as a good example of the sort of complex, collaborative, and international digitisation projects that the British Library was increasingly engaged in. She explained that none of the individual institutions participating in the project had the resources or facilities to allow scholars full access to all of the manuscripts in their collections, but by joining together and sharing knowledge and resources the institutions would be able to offer access to the combined collections of all the institutions by means of high-quality digital images. She noted that a digitisation project such as the IDP benefits both the institutions involved, who are often able to obtain more substantial funding than they would for an internal project, and also the scholarly community, who are given access through the digital images to fragile and often inaccessible items that might previously have been difficult or impossible to view.

=== Cataloguing ===
Catalogue records are stored in a relational database using the 4D database management tool. Records can be searched for by means of an online search form that allows users to filter search results by different criteria, such as type of artefact, holding institute, archaeological site, and language or script.

Each online catalogue record incorporates a physical description of the item, catalogue records from existing print sources, translations if available, and bibliographic references. The IDP also encourages scholarly users to submit their own catalogue entries and research results on individual items for addition to the database.

=== Conservation ===
In order to better understand how to conserve the fragile materials that most of the items in the IDP database are made from (paper, textile, and wood), the IDP has developed techniques for the conservation and preservation of documents and artefacts. These techniques are often presented at conservation conferences and journals, or published on institutional blogs, such as the British Library’s collection care blog. The IDP hopes to foster good conservation practices and common standards amongst participating institutes, ensuring that artefacts are stored under the most suitable conditions, and are handled as little as possible.

The IDP has also supported a number of conservation projects (such as the analysis of paper and textile fibres) and has organised regular conferences on conservation issues at venues across the world. Between 1993 and 2007 seven IDP Conservation Conferences were held by various institutions that participate in the IDP Programme. Published conference proceedings have also been produced such as in the British Library’s The British Library Studies in Conservation Science series, as well as volumes published by the Bibliothèque nationale de France, the National Library of China, and Ryukoku University.

In December 2022, the IDP and British Library completed the Lotus Sutra Manuscripts Digitisation Project which saw the conservation and digitisation of over 800 copies of the Lotus Sutra, held in the British Library’s collections. Many conservation techniques developed during this project, including a method for creating custom preservation cores for vulnerable manuscripts and their associated rollers, were published to increase knowledge surrounding the preservation needs of the collection. Digitation methodology and standards were also published to help future digitation projects for these materials.

=== Digitisation ===
To facilitate the locating of items on the IDP database the project has also digitised a large number of catalogues and bibliographic sources, and made them available online, with links from the original catalogue publication to the corresponding online catalogue entry in the IDP database.

The IDP centre at the British Library set up a digitisation studio in 2001, and now similar studios have been established at IDP centres across Europe and Asia. In addition to making high-quality digital images of items, infrared photography is used for manuscripts with faded ink or which are otherwise hard to read in normal light. Other methods, such as multi-spectral imaging and high-magnification fibre analysis photography, are also used should there be a necessary research justification.

=== Education ===
The IDP also organises and supports lectures, workshops and symposiums related to Dunhuang and Silk Road studies. These activities include academic conferences, professional training in conservation and digitisation, and online events intended to broaden access to current research. Recordings and educational resources from selected events are made available through the programme’s website as part of its commitment to open access and knowledge sharing.

Since the launch of the new IDP website in 2024, a series of educational learning resources have been published. Aimed at appealing to general audiences, these learning resources cover thematic topics such as Chinese Astronomy and Buddhism on the Silk Roads, making use of collection items held by partnering institutions and digitised to be available on the IDP website to explain these themes. The IDP also engages in various educational activities, organising exhibitions, workshops, and educational events for schools.

Collections held by the partner institutions that make up the IDP have been displayed publicly in numerous exhibitions since the launch of the IDP. In 2004 the IDP organised a major exhibition entitled "The Silk Road: Trade, Travel, War and Faith", which was held at the British Library. At the time, this was the most successful exhibition ever held at the British Library, and attracted 155,000 visitors. Another exhibition at the British Library, “A Silk Road Oasis: Life in Ancient Dunhuang”, ran from September 2024 until February 2025. The IDP expanded this exhibition’s legacy by launching a digitally scanned 360 degrees virtual exhibition on the IDP’s website, allowing the exhibition to live on as a virtual education tool in both English and Chinese.

== History ==
The foundations for the programme were laid in October 1993 when an international conference on Dunhuang Cave 17 was held at Sussex University. This conference brought together curators and conservators from across the world, including the British Library, the Institute of Oriental Manuscripts of the Russian Academy of Sciences, Bibliothèque nationale de France, and the National Library of China, and in its aftermath an IDP Steering Group was set up by Graham Shaw (Deputy Director of the Oriental & India Office Collection at the British Library), Frances Wood (Head of the Chinese Section at the British Library), and Peter Lawson (Conservator at the British Library). Susan Whitfield was appointed to edit the newsletter, which ran continuously until 2017, and was later appointed Director of the IDP. The first meeting of the IDP steering group was held on 11 April 1994, when the name International Dunhuang Project was adopted. The first newsletter was published on 16 May 1994.

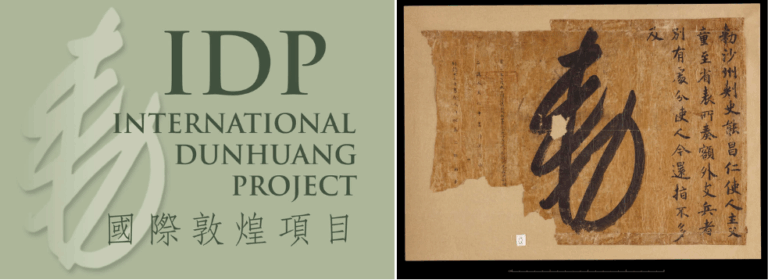
A comparison of the (left) IDP logo (1994-2024) and (right) a Chinese-language manuscript from Dunhuang with the character chi 敕 in cursive from Or.8210/S.11287q, held at the British Library.

The first logo of the IDP was adopted in 1994, which used a cursive rendering of the Chinese character chi 敕 (imperial dictate) that appears on a Chinese-language manuscript from Dunhuang in the British Library collections. This logo was in use up until 2024.

The IDP was initially founded with 3-year grant from the Chiang Ching-kuo Foundation, and had only one member of staff. The following year the IDP database was designed and implemented, and in 1996 a grant from the British Academy allowed the hiring of a part-time research assistant to input catalogue data into the database.

In 1997, with funding of £148,000 from the Heritage Lottery Fund, the IDP started to digitise manuscripts held at the British Library, and in 1998 the database went online with an initial 20,000 catalogue entries and about 1,000 images of digitised manuscripts.

In 2001, with substantial support from the Mellon Foundation, work started on the digitisation of manuscripts held at collections in Paris and Beijing, and in 2003 digital images of Dunhuang paintings held at the British Museum were added to the database. By 2004 the IDP database included images of some 50,000 manuscripts, paintings, artefacts, and historical photographs.

IDP Centres were opened in Beijing in 2001, in St. Petersburg and Kyoto in 2004, in Berlin in 2005, in Dunhuang in 2007, in Paris in 2008, and in Seoul in 2010. These IDP centres acted as regional hubs within a network where individual institutions worked on cataloguing, conserving, and digitising their own collections, as well as collections in agreement with other partner institutions such as the Victoria and Albert Museum, the British Museum, Musée Guimet, and the Library of the Hungarian Academy of Sciences. Each IDP centre then hosted its own server on which it made its images and metadata available to other IDP partners via a synchronised database. The IDP English-language website, which was launched in 1998, was followed by a series of multilingual IDP website versions such as the Chinese-language website which launched in 2002, a Russian-language website in 2004, a German-language website in 2005, a French-language website was launched in 2008, as well as a Korean website in 2010.

The first director of the IDP was Susan Whitfield, who retired from the position in July 2017.

In 2024, the IDP marked its 30th anniversary. To coincide with the anniversary, the programme introduced updated branding and formally adopted the name International Dunhuang Programme to emphasise its long-term institutional role rather than it being a time-limited project. The same year, IDP launched a redesigned website to improve usability and access to its expanding digital collections and research resources.

The IDP partner institutions regularly meet and organise research conferences, including an international conference in Dunhuang in 2024 co-organised by the Dunhuang Research Academy and the British Library. The conference brought together scholars, conservators and representatives from partner institutions to discuss recent research and future directions for international cooperation in the conservation, digitisation and research of Silk Road materials.

== Participating institutions ==
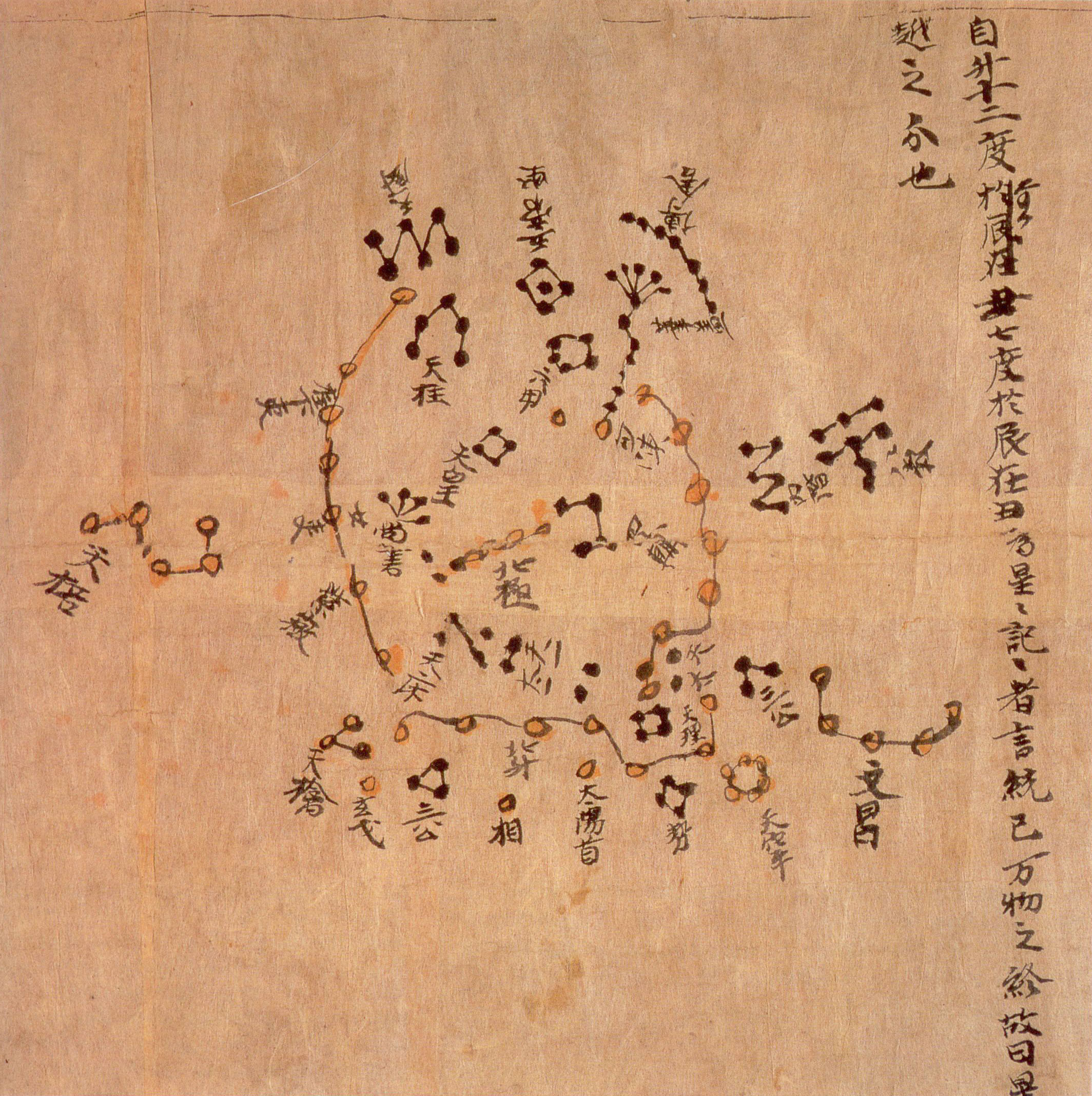
Detail of the Dunhuang Star Chart showing the North Polar region (British Library Or.8210/S.3326)

The following institutions are participating in the programme.

- Academia Sinica, Taipei, Taiwan
- Art Institute of Chicago, USA
- Berlin-Brandenburg Academy of Sciences and Humanities, Berlin, Germany
- Bibliothèque nationale de France, Paris, France
- British Library, London, England
- British Museum, London, England
- Chester Beatty Library, Dublin, Ireland
- Detroit Institute of Arts, Detroit, USA
- Dunhuang Research Academy, Dunhuang, China
- Field Museum of Natural History, Chicago, USA
- Freer Gallery of Art, Smithsonian Institution, Washington DC, USA
- Hermitage Museum, St. Petersburge, Russia
- Institute of Oriental Manuscripts (prior to 2007 the St Petersburg branch of the Institute of Oriental Studies), St. Petersburg, Russia
- Library of the Hungarian Academy of Sciences, Budapest, Hungary
- Middlebury College Museum of Art, Middlebury, USA
- Morgan Library, New York, USA
- Musée Guimet, Paris, France
- Museum of Asian Art, Berlin, Germany
- National Central Library, Taipei, Taiwan
- National Library of China, Beijing, China
- National Museum of Ethnography, Stockholm, Sweden
- National Museum of India, New Delhi, India
- Needham Research Institute, Cambridge, England
- Philadelphia Museum of Art, Philadelphia, USA
- Princeton University, (Gest Library and Art Museum), Princeton, USA
- Research Institute of Korean Studies, Korea University, Seoul, South Korea
- Royal Danish Library, Copenhagen, Denmark
- Ryukoku University, Kyoto, Japan
- State Library, Berlin, Germany
- Sven Hedin Foundation, Stockholm, Sweden
- University Museum and Art Gallery, Hong Kong
- University of California at Los Angeles, USA
- Victoria and Albert Museum, London, England

== IDP Centres ==
The International Dunhuang Programme has centres in seven countries. The London centre, based at the British Library, acts as the secretariat for the IDP, and is responsible for maintaining the IDP database and the main English-language website. The other centres previously maintained local-language versions of the IDP website, though efforts are ongoing to unify the IDP's digital platforms. Currently, the website hosted by the National Library of China provides access to materials in Chinese.

Each centre is responsible for the conservation, cataloguing, and digitisation of manuscripts in its country. The staff at these centres help train participating institutions in the use of digitisation equipment and computer software, as well as hosting knowledge exchanges in conservation and research techniques.

Centres with active websites
Centre	Institution	Established	Website	Images^{[1]}	Notes
London	British Library	1994	idp.bl.uk/	173,850	Also hosts images for those institutions that do not have their own IDP website, such as the British Museum and Princeton University.
Beijing	National Library of China	2001	idp.nlc.cn/	195,252	
Berlin	Berlin-Brandenburg Academy of Sciences and Humanities and Berlin State Library	2005	idp.bbaw.de/	71,061	
Dunhuang	Dunhuang Academy	2007	idp.dha.ac.cn/	2,875	Responsible for manuscripts held by institutions in Gansu province.
Notes 1.Count of number of images in the IDP database as of 13 January 2021.

Centres without active websites
Centre	Institution	Established	Website	Images^{[1]}	Notes^{[2]}
Kyoto	Ryukoku University	2004	idp.afc.ryukoku.ac.jp/	17,364	This website was consolidated into the main idp.bl.uk website in 2023 to simplify the online offerings.
St Petersburg	Institute of Oriental Manuscripts of the Russian Academy of Sciences	2004	idp.orientalstudies.ru	22,672	This website was consolidated into the main idp.bl.uk website in 2022 to simplify the online offerings.
Paris	Bibliothèque nationale de France and Guimet Museum	2008	idp.bnf.fr/	55,681	This website was consolidated into the main idp.bl.uk website in 2024 to simplify the online offerings.
Seoul	Research Institute of Korean Studies at Korea University	2010	idp.korea.ac.kr/	n/a	This website was consolidated into the main idp.bl.uk website in 2016 to simplify the online offerings.
Notes 1.Count of number of images in the IDP database as of 13 January 2021.: 2. Access to the database is now provided through idp.bl.uk.

== Collections ==
The IDP database includes material from a number of important collections held by participating institutions of the IDP.

=== The Stein Collections ===
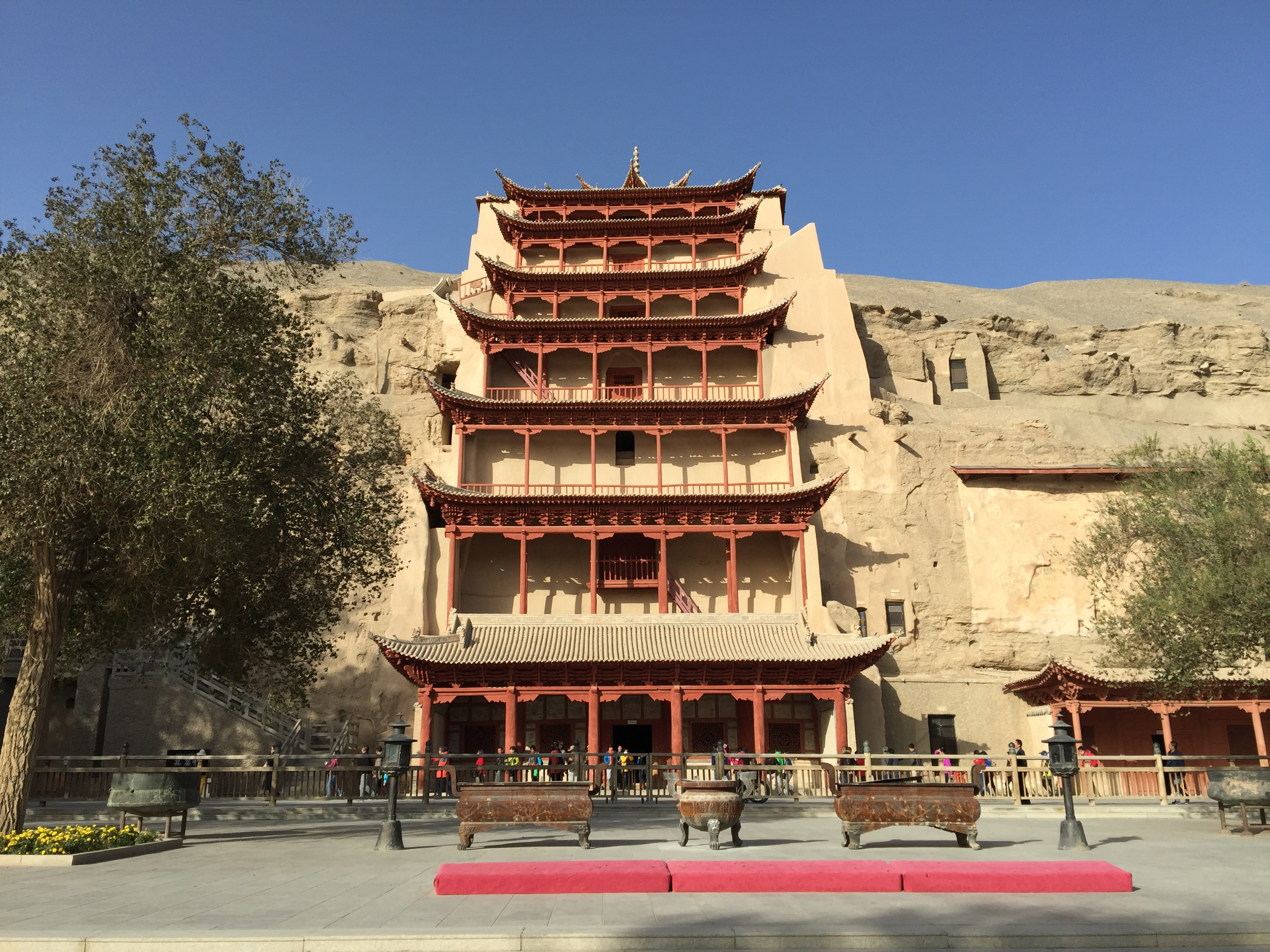
The Mogao Caves at Dunhuang

Aurel Stein (1862–1943) made four expeditions to Central Asia (1900–1901, 1906–1908, 1913–1916, and 1930–1931), during which he collected a vast amount of material, including a large number of manuscripts that he acquired from the 'Library Cave' (Cave 17) of the Mogao Caves at Dunhuang during his second expedition. Some of the material that he collected, including murals, paintings, artefacts and manuscripts, was sent to India as his first three expeditions had been sponsored by the Indian government. Most of this material is now held at the National Museum of India in New Delhi, but a small amount of the material from his first expedition is held at the Indian Museum in Calcutta, and at Lahore Museum in Pakistan. The rest of the material collected by Stein was taken to England, and is now shared between the British Library, British Museum, and the Victoria and Albert Museum.

The British Library holds over 45,000 items collected by Stein, mostly comprising manuscripts, printed texts, and inscribed pieces of wood, written in a wide variety of scripts and languages, including Chinese, Tibetan, Sanskrit, Tangut, Khotanese, Tocharian, Sogdian, Uyghur, Turkic and Mongolian:

- about 14,000 scrolls and paper fragments in Chinese from Dunhuang Cave 17
- about 5,000 paper fragments and 4,000 woodlsips in Chinese from sites other than Dunhuang
- about 3,100 scrolls and pages in Tibetan from Dunhuang
- about 2,300 woodslips in Tibetan from Miran and Mazar Tagh
- about 1,000 paper fragments in Tibetan from Khara-Khoto and Etsin-gol
- about 700 paper fragments in Tibetan from other sites
- about 7,000 items in Brahmi and Kharosthi
- about 6,000 paper fragments in Tangut
- about 50 scrolls, 2,000 paper fragments and 100 woodslips in Khotanese
- about 1,200 items in Tocharian
- about 400 items in Old Turkic and Uyghur
- about 150 items in Sogdian

The British Library Stein Collection also includes some artefacts such as textile fragments, sutra wrappers and paste brushes, as well as over 10,000 photographs, negatives and lantern slides taken by Stein.

The British Museum holds a collection of over 1,500 archaeological artefacts collected from various Silk Road sites by Stein, as well as non-literary items from Dunhuang Cave 17, comprising more than 240 paintings on silk or paper, 200 textiles, and about 30 woodblock prints. The museum also holds over 4,000 coins collected by Stein, about three quarters of which are Chinese, and most of the rest are Islamic. Images of all of the paintings and some of the artefacts are now included in the IDP database, and the coins may be added at a future date.

The Victoria and Albert Museum holds a collection of more than 650 textiles collected by Stein from various Silk Road sites, all of which have now been added to the IDP database.

Many of Stein's personal papers and diaries are held at the Western Manuscript Department of the Bodleian Library at Oxford University. A collection of personal papers and photographs held at the library of the Hungarian Academy of Sciences have been added to the IDP database.

The removal by Stein of so much cultural and archaeological material from China has caused anger in China, and there have been calls for the texts and artefacts collected by Stein from Dunhuang that are now in the British Museum and British Library to be repatriated to China. Although the Chinese government has not formally requested their return, in 2003 an official at the Chinese Embassy in London stated that "[l]ittle by little, we will expect to see the return of items taken from Dunhuang — they should go back to their original place".

=== The Hoernle Collection ===
The Hoernle Collection, named after Augustus Hoernle (1841–1918), is a collection of Central Asian manuscripts collected by the Indian government. 22 consignments were sent to Hoernle in Calcutta between 1895 and 1899, and these were sent to the British Museum in 1902. A further ten consignments were sent to Hoernle in London after his retirement in 1899. The Hoernle Collection, which comprises over 2,000 Sanskrit manuscripts, 1,200 Tocharian manuscripts, and about 250 Khotanese manuscripts, as well as a few Chinese, Persian and Uyghur manuscripts, is now held by the British Library.

=== The Pelliot Collection ===
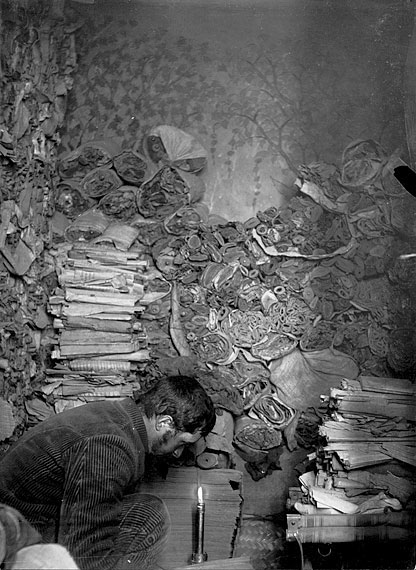
Paul Pelliot examining manuscripts in the 'Library Cave' (Cave 17) at Dunhuang in 1908

Paul Pelliot (1878–1945) led an expedition to Kucha and Dunhuang between 1906 and 1908. In Kucha and elsewhere in Chinese Turkestan he collected hundreds of woodslips with inscriptions in Sanskrit and Tocharian. Pelliot arrived at the Mogao Caves at Dunhuang a year after Stein, where he acquired thousands of manuscripts from the 'Library Cave' (Cave 17), as well as hundreds of manuscripts and printed texts from Caves 464 and 465. The items collected by Pelliot are held at the Bibliothèque nationale de France, and are divided into the following sub-collections:

- Pelliot Tibetan : 4,174 manuscripts and woodblock prints in Tibetan
- Pelliot Chinese : about 3,000 scrolls, booklets, paintings and woodblock prints, and around 700 fragments, in Chinese
- Pelliot Sanskrit : about 4,000 fragments in Sanskrit
- Pelliot Kuchean : about 2,000 woodslips and paper fragments in Tocharian
- Pelliot Sogdian : about 40 Sogdian manuscripts
- Pelliot Uighur : about 20 Uyghur manuscripts
- Pelliot Khotanais : Khotanese manuscripts
- Pelliot Xixia : more than 200 items in the Tangut script, mostly woodblock prints (all discvovered in Cave 464 in March 1908)
- Pelliot divers : miscellaneous items

=== The Kozlov Collection ===
Pyotr Kozlov (1863–1935) made an expedition to the Tangut fortress city of Khara-Khoto during 1907–1909. The city had been abandoned in the late 14th century, and had been largely buried in sand for several hundred years. Kozlov unearthed thousands of manuscripts and woodblock prints, mostly written in the dead Tangut language, which had been preserved beneath the sands of Khara-Khoto. The collection of Tangut texts that Kozlov brought back from Khara-Khoto were originally housed in the museum of Alexander III of Russia in St Petersburg, but were transferred to the Asiatic Museum in 1911. They are now held at the Institute of Oriental Manuscripts in St Petersburg. In addition to the several thousand Tangut texts, the Kozlov Collection includes about 660 manuscripts and printed books in Chinese, mostly Buddhist texts.

The site of Khara-Khoto was excavated by Aurel Stein in 1917, during his third expedition, and several thousand Tangut manuscript fragments recovered by Stein are in the Stein Collection of the British Library.

=== The Oldenburg Collections ===
Sergey Oldenburg (1863–1934), who was the first director of the Institute of Oriental Studies (formerly the Asiatic Museum) in St Petersburg, made two expeditions to Central Asia (1909–1910 and 1914–1915), which were to become known as the 'Russian Turkestan expeditions'. During the first expedition Oldenburg explored a number of sites around Turpan, including Shikchin, Yarkhoto and Kucha, and collected murals, paintings, terracottas, and about one hundred manuscripts, mostly fragments written in the Brahmi script. During his second expedition Oldenburg surveyed the Mogao Caves at Dunhuang, and revisited some of the sites in Turpan that he had visited during his first expedition. He found a large number of artefacts and manuscript fragments (nearly 20,000 fragments, some of them tiny) at Dunhuang, and also purchased about 300 scrolls from local people.

Oldenburg's collections are shared between the Institute of Oriental Manuscripts and the Hermitage Museum. The Institute of Oriental Manuscripts holds the more than 19,000 manuscript fragments and 365 manuscript scrolls collected from Dunhuang by Oldenburg, as well as about thirty manuscripts collected by Sergey Malov during an expedition to Khotan during 1909–1910, and some 183 Uyghur manuscripts collected by N. N. Krotkov, the Russian Consul in Urumqi and Ghulja.

The Hermitage Museum holds artefacts from both of Oldenburg's expeditions, including 66 Buddhist banners and banner-tops, 137 fragments of Buddhist silk paintings, 43 fragments of Buddhist paintings on paper, 24 murals, 38 pieces of textile, and eight manuscript fragments. Oldenburg's personal papers, diaries, maps and photographs relating to the two expeditions are also held at the Hermitage.

=== Dunhuang Collections at the National Library of China ===
During 1907–1908 Stein and Pelliot had visited Dunhuang, and had both purchased large quantities of manuscripts from Wang Yuanlu (c.1849–1931), a Taoist priest and self-proclaimed guardian of the Mogao Caves. News of the discovery of these manuscripts was brought to the attention of Chinese scholars when Pelliot visited Beijing in 1909, and the renowned scholar and antiquarian Luo Zhenyu (1866–1940) persuaded the Ministry of Education to recover the 8,000 or so remaining manuscripts. In 1910 Fu Baoshu 傅寶書 was dispatched to Dunhuang to bring the remaining manuscripts back to Beijing, although he left the Tibetan manuscripts behind. Some of the manuscripts were stolen by the minister Li Shengduo 李盛鐸 shortly after they had arrived at the Ministry of Education, but soon after the Xinhai Revolution in 1911 the manuscripts were deposited in the newly founded Metropolitan Library (later to become the National Library of China).

The 8,697 manuscripts that Fu Baoshu brought back from Dunhuang form the core of the Dunhuang collection in the National Library of China, but they have since been augmented by various purchases and donations over the years, so that the library collection now amounts to some 16,000 items, including 4,000 small manuscript fragments.

=== The Ōtani Collections ===
Ōtani Kōzui (1876–1948) was a hereditary Buddhist abbot from Kyoto, Japan, but he had studied in London, and after meeting the explorers Aurel Stein and Sven Hedin (1865–1952) he decided to explore Central Asia himself from a Buddhist perspective. In 1902 he left England to return to Japan overland via St Petersburg, and together with four other returning Japanese students he made his way to Kashgar. From Kashgar the expedition divided into two groups, Ōtani and two others travelling to Srinagar and India, before returning to Japan; and the two others exploring the region of Khotan and Turpan, and excavating the previously unexplored site of Kucha, before returning to Japan in 1904. Ōtani became abbot of the Nishi Honganji Monastery in Kyoto on his father's death in 1903, and so was unable to personally take part in any further expeditions, but he financed further expeditions to Chinese Turkestan in 1908–1909 and 1910–1914. The final expedition excavated the tombs of Astana outside the ancient city of Gaochang, taking back to Japan nine mummies and many grave goods and funerary texts.

The three Ōtani expeditions produced a large collection of manuscripts (especially Buddhist sutras), woodslips, murals, sculptures, textiles, coins, and seals. These items were originally deposited in the Nishi Honganji Monastery, and later at Ōtani's residence, Villa Niraku in Kobe, but in 1914 Ōtani resigned as abbot due to a bribery scandal, and much of his collection was moved to Ōtani's villa in Lüshun, China. His collection was later dispersed to various libraries, museums and collections across Japan, Korea, and China.

- The Omiya Library at Ryukoku University, Kyoto holds 8,000 miscellaneous items found in two wooden chests at Villa Niraku after Ōtani's death. These include manuscript scrolls, manuscript booklets, printed texts, wooden slips, silk paintings, textiles, plant specimens, coins, and rubbings. As well as Chinese texts, the collection includes documents written in 15 different languages and 13 different scripts, covering secular subjects as well as Manichaean Buddhist scriptures and Nestorian Christian texts.
- Tokyo National Museum holds various items from the Ōtani expeditions, including Chinese and Uyghur manuscripts and woodslips from Turpan, Dunhuang and elsewhere, as well as paintings from Dunhuang and Turpan.
- Kyoto National Museum holds a number of items from Ōtani's collection.
- Otani University, Kyoto holds 38 Dunhuang manuscripts, including 34 from Ōtani's collection.
- The Lüshun Museum in Dalian, China holds 16,035 Buddhist manuscript fragments from Turpan, as well as documents written in Brahmi, Sogdian, Tibetan, Tangut, and Uyghur.
- The National Library of China in Beijing holds 621 Dunhuang scrolls transferred from the Lüshun Museum.
- The National Museum of Korea in Seoul holds about 1,700 artefacts and 60 fragments of murals from the Bezeklik Caves that derived from Villa Niraku.

=== The Berlin Turpan Collections ===
Four German expeditions to Turpan were made in the years 1902–1903, 1904–1905, 1905–1907, and 1913–1914, the first and third expeditions led by Albert Grünwedel (1856–1935), and the second and fourth expeditions led by Albert von Le Coq (1860–1930). These expeditions brought back to Berlin a huge amount of material, including murals and other artefacts, as well as about 40,000 manuscript and woodblock fragments written in more than twenty different scripts and languages. The items collected during these four expeditions are now divided between two institutions in Berlin.

- The Berlin-Brandenburg Academy of Sciences and Humanities holds about 6,000 Old Uyghur fragments, about 1,600 Chinese and Old Uyghur fragments, 800 Middle Persian and Old Turkic fragments (formerly in the collection of the Mainz Academy of Sciences and Literature), 3,500 Manichaean fragments in various languages (primarily Middle Persian, Parthian, Old Turkic and Sogdian), about 1,000 Sogdian and Chinese/Sogdian fragments, and about 300 Sogdian fragments in the Nestorian script.
- The Oriental Department of the Berlin State Library holds about 6,000 Chinese fragments, about 100 Mongolian fragments, about 300 Syriac fragments, about 200 Tibetan fragments, about 4,000 Tocharian fragments, and about 8,000 Sanskrit fragments.

The IDP has digitised over 14,000 items from these collection, mostly the Chinese, Brahmi and Sanskrit fragments. The Middle Persian, Old Turkic and Mongolian fragments have been digitised as part of the Digital Turfan Archive hosted by the Berlin-Brandenburg Academy of Sciences and Humanities, and the Tocharian fragments have been digitised as part of the TITUS project of the Goethe University Frankfurt.

== Notable items in the IDP database ==
The following are some of the notable items in the IDP database.

Institution and pressmark	Title	Description
British Library Or.8210/P.2	Diamond Sutra (Chinese: 金剛般若波羅蜜多經; pinyin: jīngāng bōrěbōluómìduō jīng)	The oldest known dated printed book in the world, dated 868.
British Library Or.8210/S.3326	Dunhuang Star Chart	The first known graphical representation of stars from ancient Chinese astronomy, dated to the Tang dynasty (618–907).
British Library Or.8210/S.5574	Dunhuang Go Manual	The earliest surviving manual on the strategic board game of Go.
British Library Or.8210/S.9498A; British Library Or.8210/S.13683	Testament of Ba	The earliest known fragments of an account of the establishment of Buddhism in Tibet during the reign of King Trisong Detsen (r. 755–797/804), dated to 9th or 10th centuries.
British Library Or.8212/161	Irk Bitig (Book of Omens)	A 9th-century manuscript book on divination written in the Old Turkic script.
British Library Or.12380/1840	The General's Garden	A unique 12th-century manuscript translation in Tangut of a Chinese military treatise.
National Library of France Pelliot chinois 4504	Sutra of the Great Virtue of Wisdom (Chinese: 摩訶般若波羅蜜經)	One of the oldest existing Chinese Buddhist sutras, dated to the 5th century CE.
National Library of France Pelliot chinois 3532	Wang ocheonchukguk jeon (Chinese: 往五天竺國傳; pinyin: wǎng wǔtiānzhúguó zhuàn)	A travelogue by the Korean Buddhist monk Hyecho, who traveled to India in the years 723–727/728.
National Library of France Pelliot tibétain 1287	Old Tibetan Chronicle	A semi-fictitious record from the 11th century of the early kings of Tibet
National Library of France Pelliot tibétain 1288; British Library IOL Tib J 750	Old Tibetan Annals	A year-by-year account of important events in Tibet during the years 650 to 764, dated back to 11th century.
Berlin Asian Art Museum MIK III 6368	Leaf from a Manichaean book MIK III 6368	An example of a Manichaean illuminated manuscript, dated to the 8th-9th centuries CE.

== Awards ==
In November 2010 the IDP was awarded the Casa Asia Award by the Spanish governmental consortium, Casa Asia, for its work in digitizing and preserving manuscripts.

== See also ==
- Dunhuang manuscripts
- Digital library
- Institute of Oriental Manuscripts of the Russian Academy of Sciences
- List of Tangut books
- Mogao caves
- Preservation (library and archival science)
