= Dunhuang manuscripts =

Ancient Tibetan and Chinese documents

Coordinates: 40°02′14″N 94°48′15″E

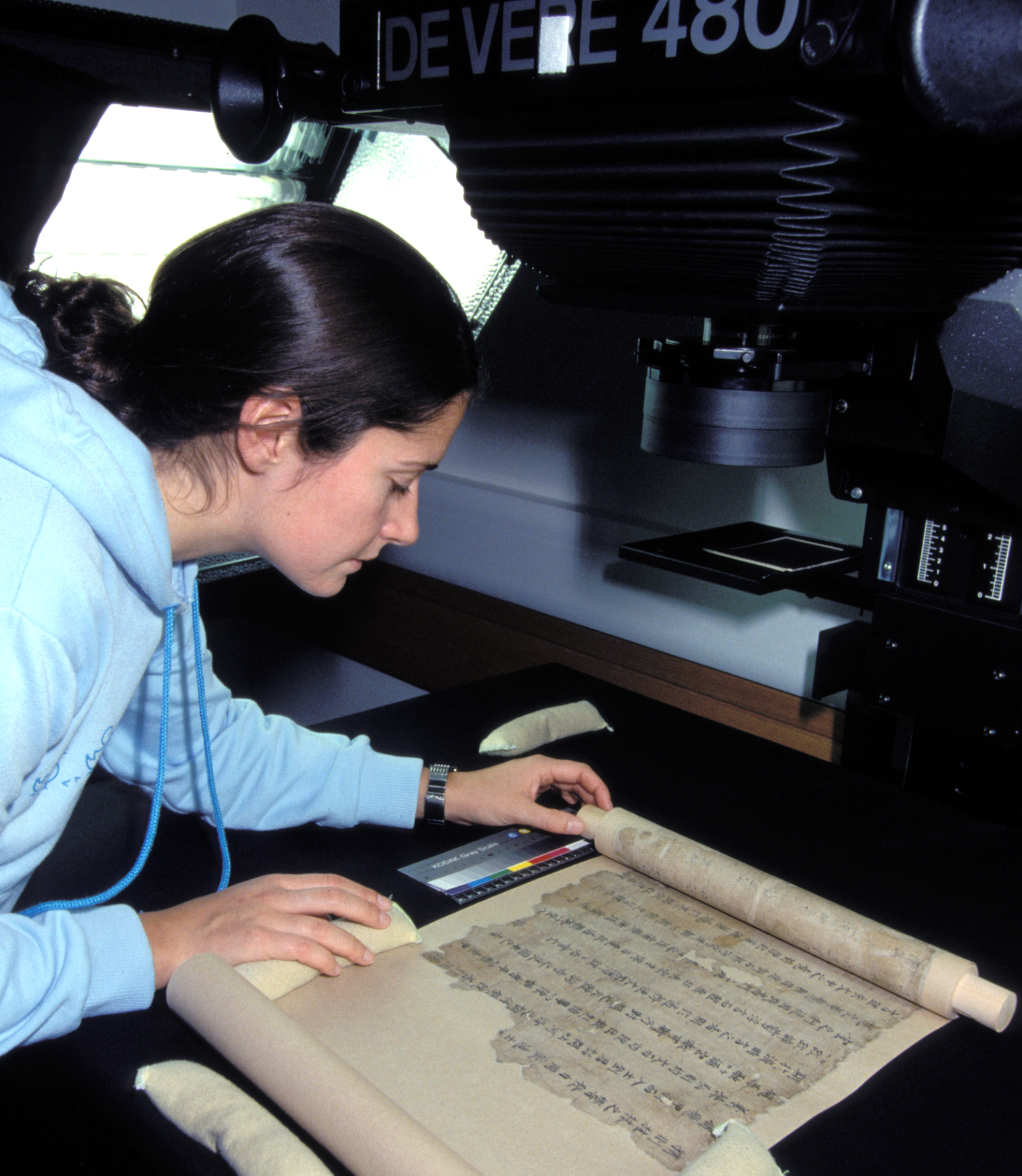
Digitisation of a Dunhuang manuscript by the International Dunhuang Programme

The Dunhuang manuscripts are a large and varied collection of religious and secular texts, consisting mainly of handwritten manuscripts on materials such as hemp, silk, and paper, along with some woodblock-printed items. Composed in a range of languages including Chinese, Tibetan and others, these manuscripts were discovered in 1900 at the Mogao Caves near Sachu in Dunhuang, Gansu Province, China, by the itinerant Daoist monk Wang Yuanlu. After taking over the caves, Wang sold the manuscripts to Aurel Stein and Paul Pelliot for a modest sum. Knowing the philological value of the Dunhuang manuscripts, Stein and Pelliot bought them from Wang and took them from China to Europe.

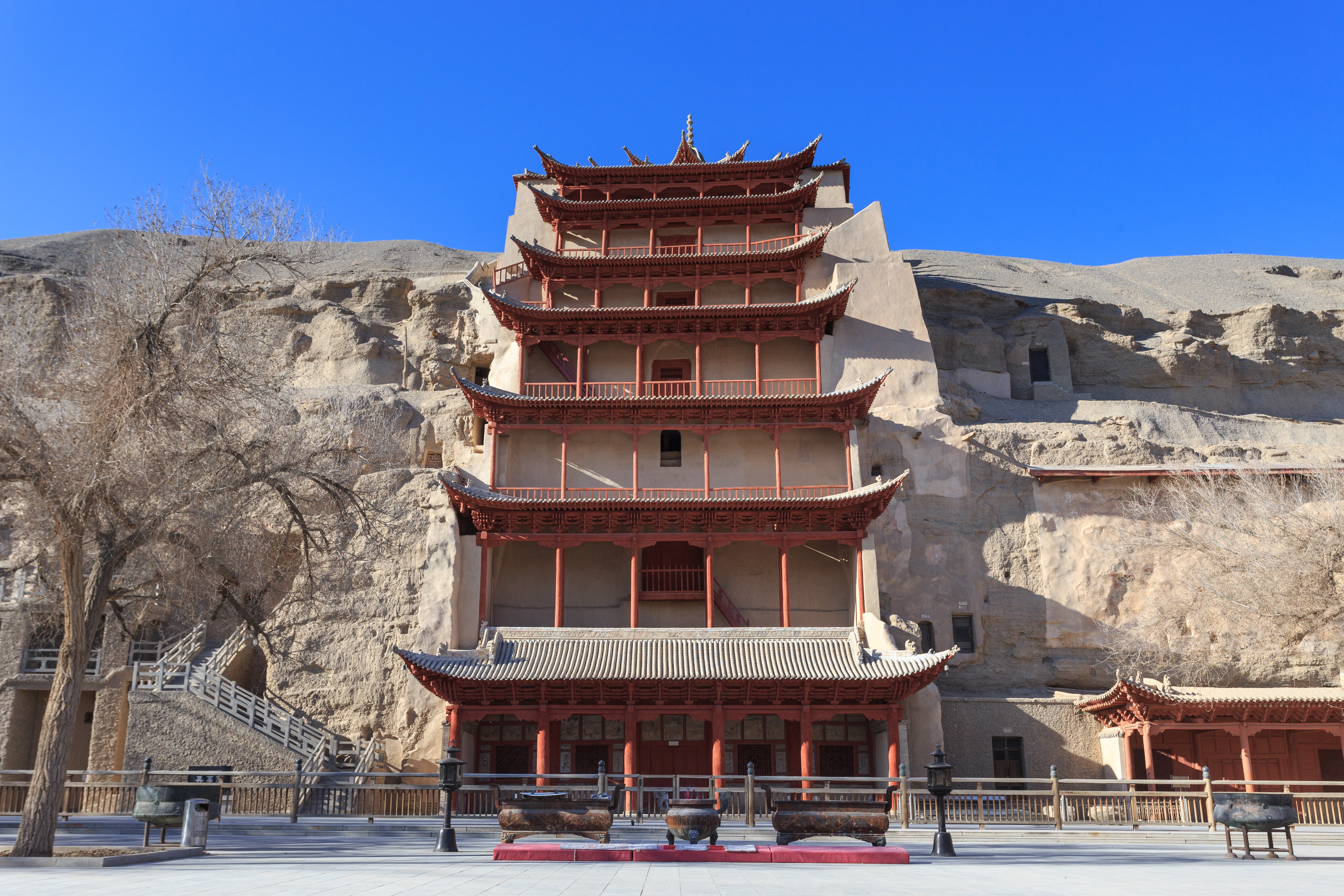
Dunhuang Mogao cave

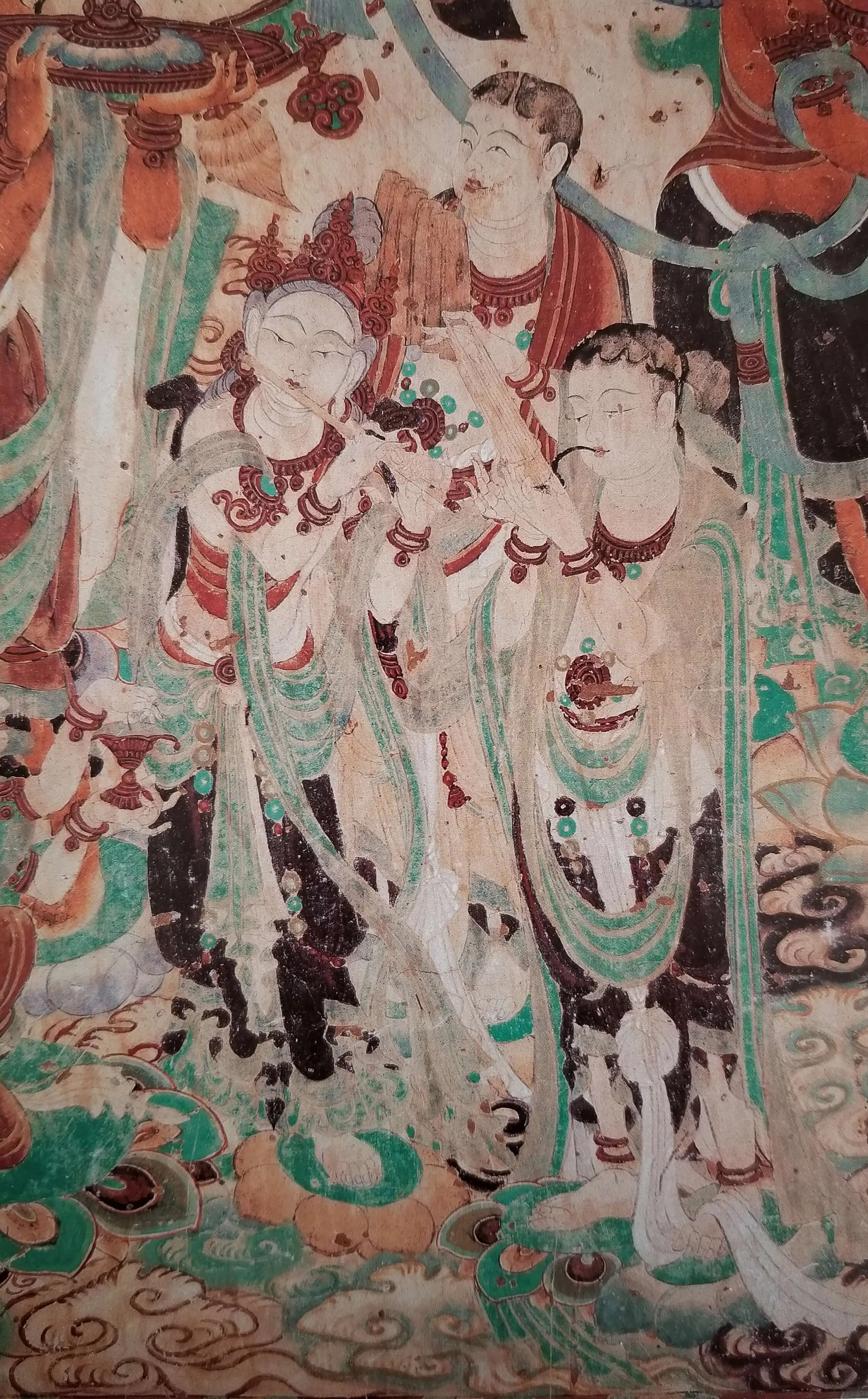
Mogao cave painting depicting musicians

Most of the manuscripts originate from a cache of documents produced between the late 4th and early 11th centuries. These were sealed in what is now known as the Library Cave (Cave 17) sometime in the early 11th century. The site at Sachu (modern-day Dunhuang) was an important regional centre for manuscript production during this period and had also served as an official printing office during the 8th and 9th centuries when the area was under Tibetan rule and formed part of the Silk Road network.

Wang Yuanlu reportedly used the cave complex as a base for his alms-collecting activities and allegedly had discovered the documents concealed behind a sealed wall in an annex within one of the caves.

In addition to the Library Cave, manuscripts and printed texts have also been discovered in several other caves at the site. Notably, Pelliot retrieved a large number of documents from Caves 464 and 465 in the northern section of the Mogao Caves. These documents mostly date to the Yuan dynasty (1271–1368), several hundred years after the Library Cave was sealed, and are written in various languages, including Tibetan, Chinese, and Old Uyghur.

The Dunhuang documents include works ranging from history, medicine and mathematics to folk songs and dance. There are also many religious documents, most of which are Buddhist, but other religions and philosophy including Daoism, Confucianism, Nestorian Christianity, Judaism, and Manichaeism, are also represented. These manuscripts constitute a major resource for academic research across numerous disciplines, including history, medicine, religious studies, linguistics, and manuscript studies. The majority of the manuscripts Pelliot took and are stored in the Bibliothèque nationale de France's collection are in Chinese (3,000 texts) and Tibetan (4,000 texts). The multitude of other languages represented in the manuscripts include Khotanese, Kuchean, Sanskrit, Sogdian, Old Uyghur, Prakrit, Hebrew, and Old Turkic.

The removal of the manuscripts has since been described by some scholars as "plunder," with the Chinese government calling for their return, including eight volumes that were repatriated by a Japanese businessman in 1997.

== History ==
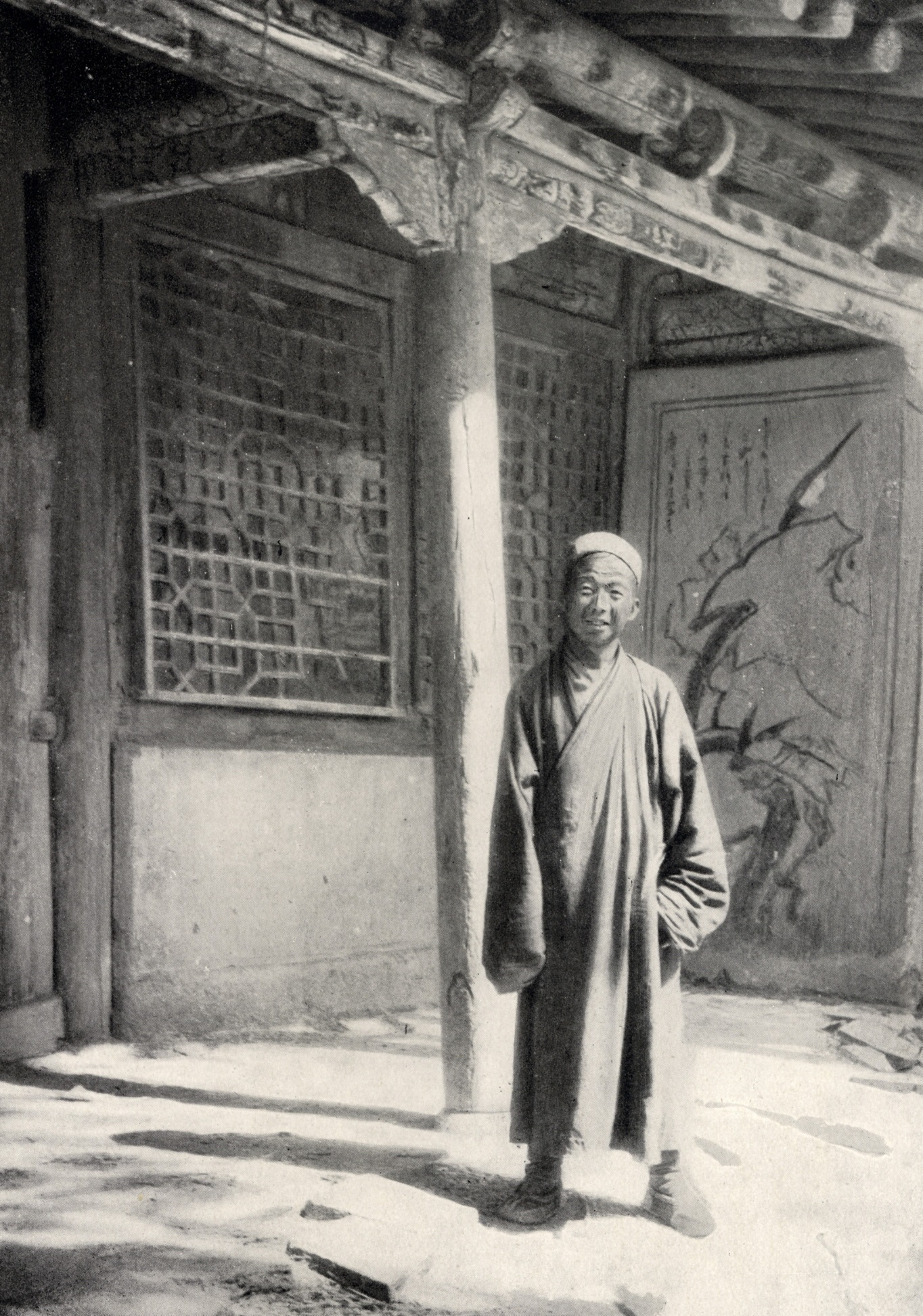
Abbot Wang Yuanlu, discoverer of the hidden Library Cave

The majority of surviving Dunhuang manuscripts were kept in a cave, the so-called Library Cave (Cave 17), which had been walled off sometime early in the 11th century. The documents in the cave were discovered by the Daoist monk Wang Yuanlu, who was interested in restoring the Mogao Caves, on 25 June 1900. In the next few years, Wang took some manuscripts to show to various officials who expressed varying level of interest, but in 1904 Wang re-sealed the cave following an order by the governor of Gansu concerned about the cost of transporting these documents. From 1907 onwards, Wang began to sell them to Western explorers, including British archaeologist Aurel Stein and French sinologist Paul Pelliot. According to Stein who was the first to describe the cave in its original state:

Heaped up in layers, but without any order, there appeared in the dim light of the priest's little lamp a solid mass of manuscript bundles rising to a height of nearly ten feet, and filling, as subsequent measurement showed, close on 500 cubic feet. The area left clear within the room was just sufficient for two people to stand in.

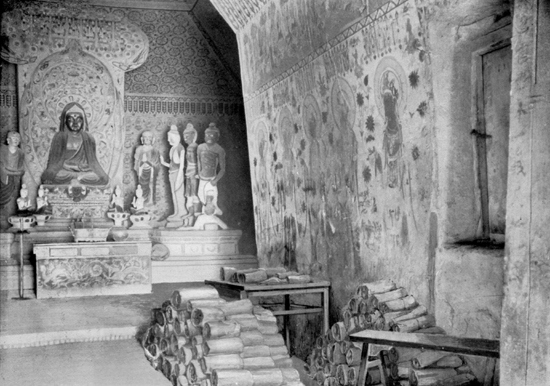
Image of Cave 16 taken by Aurel Stein in 1907, with a small high doorway leading to Cave 17, the Library Cave, seen on the right. The table, bench, and piles of manuscripts near the doorway is Stein's doctored addition made by overlaying a different photo negative.

Stein had the first pick and he was able to collect around 7,000 complete manuscripts and 6,000 fragments for which he paid £130 (equivalent to £13,521 in 2025), although these include many duplicate copies of the Diamond and Lotus Sutras. Pelliot took almost 10,000 documents for the equivalent of £90 (equivalent to £9,361 in 2025), but, unlike Stein, Pelliot was a trained sinologist literate in Chinese, and he was allowed to examine the manuscripts freely, so he was able to pick a better selection of documents than Stein. Pelliot was interested in the more unusual and exotic of the Dunhuang manuscripts, such as those dealing with the administration and financing of the monastery and associated lay men's groups. Many of these manuscripts survived only because they formed a type of palimpsest whereby papers were reused and Buddhist texts were written on the opposite side of the paper. Hundreds more of the manuscripts were sold by Wang to Ōtani Kōzui and Sergey Oldenburg.

In addition to the manuscripts that he acquired from Wang, Pelliot also uncovered a large number of manuscripts and printed texts from Caves 464 and 465 (Pelliot's Caves 181 and 182) in the northern section of the site. These documents date to the Yuan dynasty (1271–1368), and are written in various languages, including Chinese, Tibetan, and Old Uyghur. The documents also include over two hundred fragments of texts written in the Tangut language, which is significant as the Tangut script (devised in 1036) is entirely absent from the Library Cave documents.

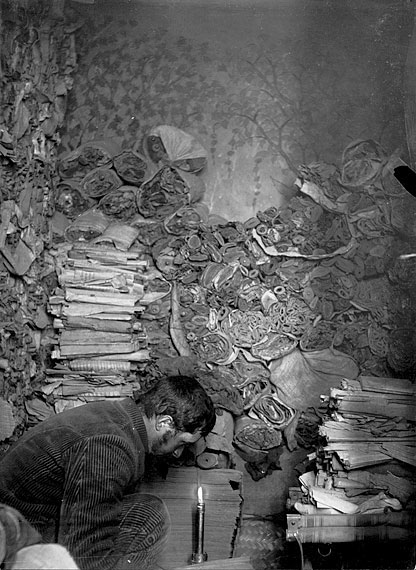
Paul Pelliot examining manuscripts in the Library Cave, 1908

Scholars in Beijing were alerted to the significance of the manuscripts after seeing samples of the documents in Pelliot's possession. Due to the efforts of the scholar and antiquarian Luo Zhenyu, most of the remaining Chinese manuscripts were taken to Beijing in 1910 and are now in the National Library of China. Several thousands of folios of Tibetan manuscripts were left in Dunhuang and are now located in several museums and libraries in the region. Rumours of caches of documents taken by local people continued for some time, and a cache of documents hidden by Wang from the authorities was later found in the 1940s. Those acquired by Western and Japanese scholars are now held in institutions around the world, including the British Library, the Tokyo National Museum, and the Bibliothèque nationale de France. All of the manuscript collections are being digitized by the International Dunhuang Project, and can be freely accessed online.

“The Chinese regard Stein and Pelliot as robbers,” wrote the British sinologist Arthur Waley. “I think the best way to understand [the feelings of the Chinese] on the subject is to imagine how we should feel if a Chinese archaeologist were to come to England, discover a cache of medieval manuscripts at a ruined monastery, bribe the custodian to part with them and carry them off to Peking. [...] Pelliot did, of course, after his return from Tun-huang, get in touch with Chinese scholars; but he had inherited so much of the nineteenth-century attitude about the right of Europeans to carry off ‘finds’ made in non-European lands that, like Stein, he seems never from the first to last to have had any qualms about the sacking of the Tun-huang library.”

== Studies ==
While most studies use Dunhuang manuscripts to address issues in areas such as history and religious studies, some have addressed questions about the provenance and materiality of the manuscripts themselves. Various reasons have been suggested for the placing of the manuscripts in the library cave and its sealing. Aurel Stein suggested that the manuscripts were "sacred waste", an explanation that found favour with later scholars including Fujieda Akira. More recently, it has been suggested that the cave functioned as a storeroom for a Buddhist monastic library, though this has been disputed. Reasons for this include the fact that, according to Rong and Hansen (1999) there was an organized method to the manner in which many manuscripts in the caves were placed; “Buddhist texts that had been divided into sections, labeled, and then placed in wrapped bundles."

The reason for the cave's sealing has also been the subject of speculation. A popular hypothesis, first suggested by Paul Pelliot, is that the cave was sealed to protect the manuscripts at the advent of an invasion by the Xixia army, and later scholars followed with the alternative suggestion that it was sealed in fear of an invasion by Islamic Kharkhanids that never occurred. Against these hypotheses, Yoshiro Imaeda suggested cave 17 was sealed simply because it ran out of room to function as storage.

Liu Bannong compiled Dunhuang Duosuo (敦煌掇瑣 "Miscellaneous works found in the Dunhuang Caves"), a pioneering work about the Dunhuang manuscripts.

== Languages and scripts ==
The variety of languages and scripts found among the Dunhuang manuscripts is a result of the multicultural nature of the region in the first millennium AD. The largest proportion of the manuscripts are written in Chinese, both Classical and, to a lesser extent, vernacular Chinese. Most manuscripts, including Buddhist texts, are written in Kaishu or 'regular script', while others are written in the cursive Xingshu or 'running script'. An unusual feature of the Dunhuang manuscripts dating from the 9th and 10th centuries is that some appear to have been written with a hard stylus rather than with a brush. According to Akira Fujieda this was due to the lack of materials for constructing brushes in Dunhuang after the Tibetan occupation in the late 8th century.

The Dunhuang manuscripts represent some of the earliest examples of Tibetan writing. Several styles are represented among the manuscripts, forebears of the later Uchen (dbu can) and Ume (dbu med) styles. Both Old Tibetan and Classical Tibetan are represented in the manuscripts, as well as the undeciphered Nam language and a language that some have identified as the Zhangzhung language.

Other languages represented are Khotanese, Sanskrit, Sogdian, Old Uyghur, and Hebrew, as well as Old Turkic (e.g. Irk Bitig).

== Buddhist texts ==
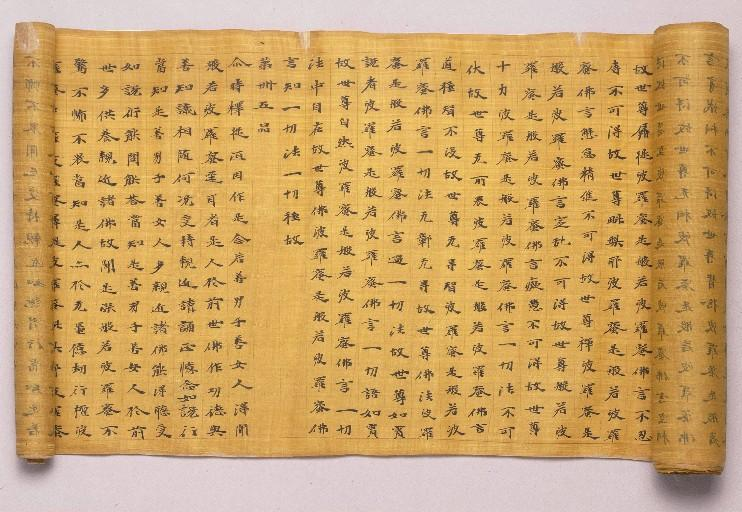
5th-century Chinese manuscript Sutra of the Great Virtue of Wisdom on silk

By far the largest proportion of manuscripts from the Dunhuang cave contain Buddhist texts. These include Buddhist sutras, commentaries and treatises, often copied for the purpose of generating religious merit. Several hundred manuscripts have been identified as notes taken by students, including the popular Buddhist narratives known as bian wen (變文). Much of the scholarship on the Chinese Buddhist manuscripts has been on the Chan (or Zen) texts, which have revolutionized the history of Chan Buddhism. Among the Tibetan Buddhist manuscripts, the texts of early Tibetan tantric Buddhism, including Mahayoga and Atiyoga or Dzogchen have been the subject of many studies.

== Other textual genres ==
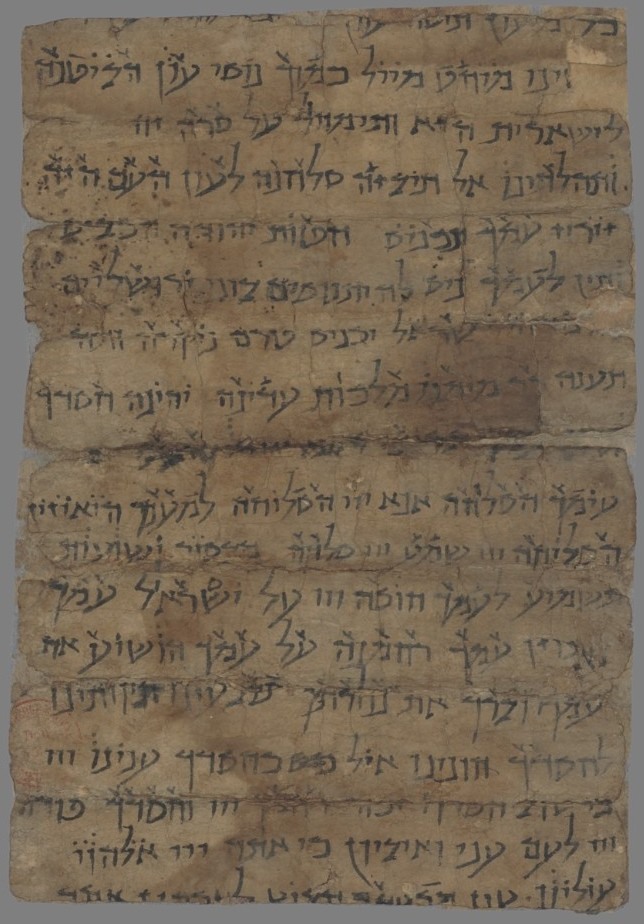
Selihah (penitential prayer) leaf written in Hebrew, 8th or 9th century

- Non-Buddhist religious texts
  - Taoist texts, including the Hua Hu Jing, and the Xiang'er commentary to the Tao Te Ching
  - Jewish Selihot prayers, as well as a version of the Old Testament in Hebrew
  - Nestorian Christian texts
  - Manichaean texts
- Social documents, such as contracts, account books and loan receipts
- Philosophy, notably the Confucian classics, including an ancient edition of Analects commented by Huang Kan (皇侃), and ancient editions of the Shang Shu
- Literature, including Chinese folk songs and Classical poetry
- History, both official and local
- Geography, including the Wang wu tianzhu guo chuan
- Medicine, including treatments for plagues and illnesses. The medical texts include a fragment of Bencaojing jizhu by Tao Hongjing, one of the earliest Chinese pharmacological texts.
- Astronomy, including the Dunhuang star map
- Mathematics
- Divination, including the Irk Bitig
- Dictionaries, including fragments of the Qieyun
- Music scores and dance notations
- Recreational games (the Dunhuang Go Classic)

== See also ==
- Afghan Geniza, similar cache of ancient religious and secular documents
- Cairo Geniza, similar cache of ancient religious and secular documents
- Dunhuang Manichaean texts
- Elephantine papyri and ostraca, similar cache of ancient religious and secular documents
- Herculaneum papyri, similar cache of ancient religious and secular documents
- Silk Road transmission of Buddhism
- Timbuktu manuscripts
- Zhuying ji, partially recovered poetry manuscript from the period of Wu Zetian
- List of libraries in the ancient world

== Cited works ==
- Mair, Victor H. (ed.) 2001. The Columbia History of Chinese Literature. New York: Columbia University Press. ISBN 0-231-10984-9. (Amazon Kindle edition.)
