= Robert Gauthiot =

French Orientalist, linguist, and explorer (1876–1916)

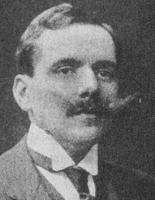
Photo of French orientalist, linguist and explorer Robert Gauthiot

Robert Edmond Gauthiot (English: /ɡoʊtiˈoʊ/ , French: [ʁɔbɛʁ ɛdmɔ̃ ɡotjo]; 13 June 1876, Paris – 11 September 1916, Paris) was a French Orientalist, linguist and explorer. Born in Paris, he became, in 1909, a member of the Société Asiatique and met Paul Pelliot. Together, they translated the Sogdian manuscript Vessantara Jataka, found by Pelliot among the Dunhuang manuscripts in Mogao Cave 17.

Gauthiot interrupted his exploration of the Pamir Mountains in July 1914 to return home to serve as a captain in the infantry during World War I. Gauthiot received the Croix de Guerre before he was wounded at the Second Battle of Artois in spring 1915. He died from injuries at Val de Grâce Hospital.
