= Wang Yuanlu =

19/20th-century Taoist priest and abbot of the Mogao Caves in Gansu Province, China

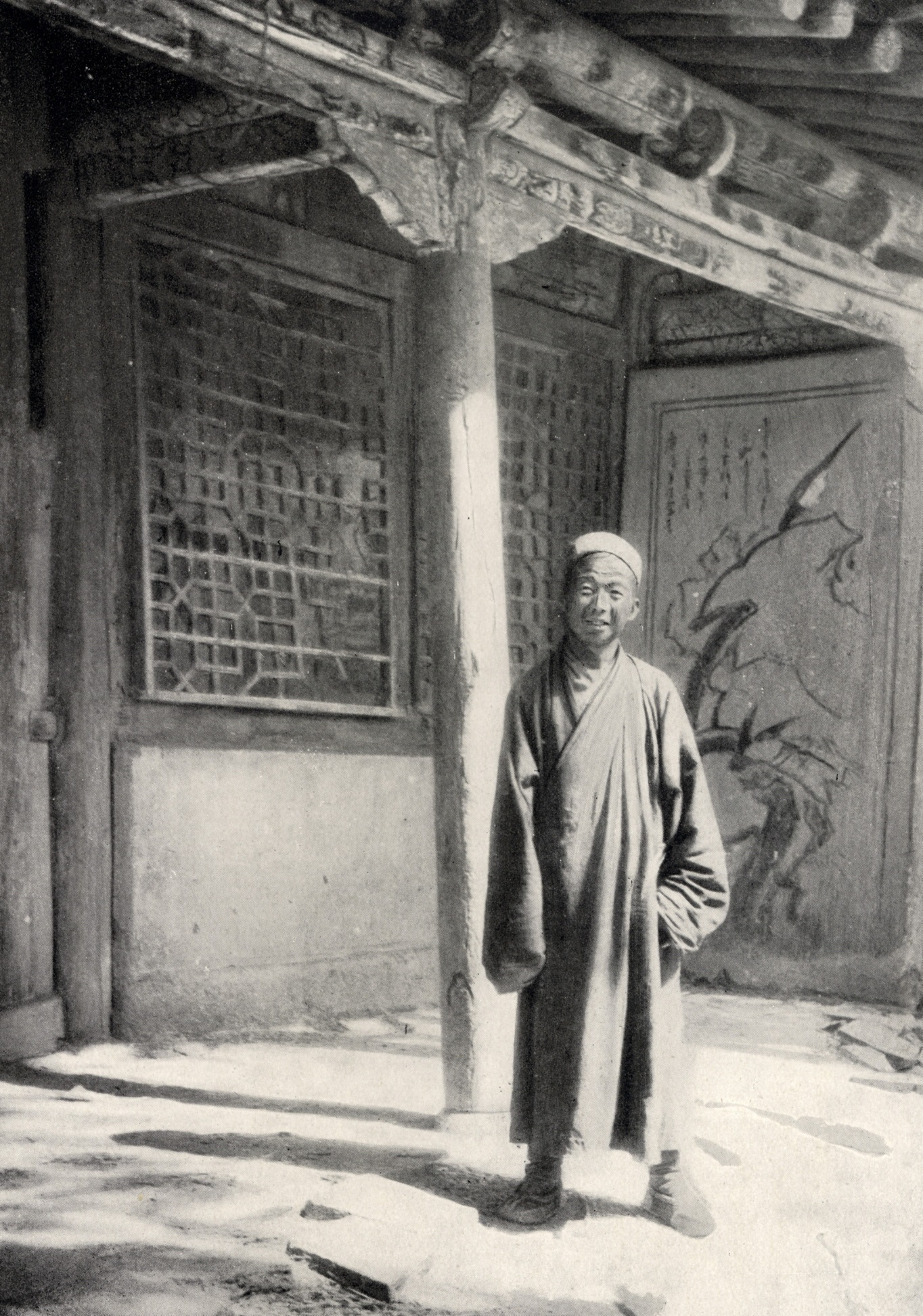
- Wang, photographed by Aurel Stein in 1921
- Occupation: Taoist priest
- Known for: Discovery of Dunhuang manuscripts

Wang Yuanlu (simplified Chinese: 王圆箓; traditional Chinese: 王圓籙; pinyin: Wáng Yuánlù; c. 1849 – 1931) was a Taoist priest and abbot of the Mogao Caves at Dunhuang, Gansu during the early 20th century. He is credited with the discovery of the Dunhuang manuscripts and was engaged in the restoration of the site, which he funded with the sale of numerous manuscripts to Western and Japanese explorers.

== Biography ==
Wang Yuanlu was an itinerant Taoist monk, originally from Shanxi Province. He was active from the late 19th to the early 20th centuries.

He was a self-appointed caretaker of the Dunhuang cave complex and a self-styled Taoist priest. The cave complex contained 50,000 manuscripts detailing medieval China, the Silk Roads, and Buddhism.

He died in 1931 at the Mogao Grottoes.

== Involvement with Dunhuang manuscripts ==
When engaging in an amateur restoration of statues, murals and paintings in what is now known as Cave 16, Wang noticed a hidden door which opened into another cave, later named Cave 17 or the "Library Cave". There, he found a yet-undiscovered cache of thousands of ancient manuscripts, many of which relate to early Chinese Buddhism.

He first spoke of the manuscripts to the local officials in an attempt to gain funding for their conservation. The officials ordered the reseal of the cave, in preparation for transportation, preservation and study. He would also later sell numerous manuscripts to archaeologist Aurel Stein, who took a largely random selection of the works. Later, Paul Pelliot would purchase what is considered the most valuable among them. Because of his involvement in the discovery and sale of the Dunhuang manuscripts to Westerners for a fraction of their value (£220 in 1907), Wang is both "revered and reviled."

== See also ==
- International Dunhuang Project
- Mawangdui

== Sources ==
- Heimovics, Dick (1999). Connecting and Disconnections on the Silk Road
- Hopkirk, Peter (1980). Foreign Devils on the Silk Road: The Search for the Lost Cities and Treasures of Chinese Central Asia. Amherst: The University of Massachusetts Press. ISBN 0-87023-435-8.
- Mair, Victor H. (ed.) 2001. The Columbia History of Chinese Literature. New York: Columbia University Press. ISBN 0-231-10984-9. (Amazon Kindle edition.)
