= Dunhuang Go Manual =

Earliest surviving manual on Go

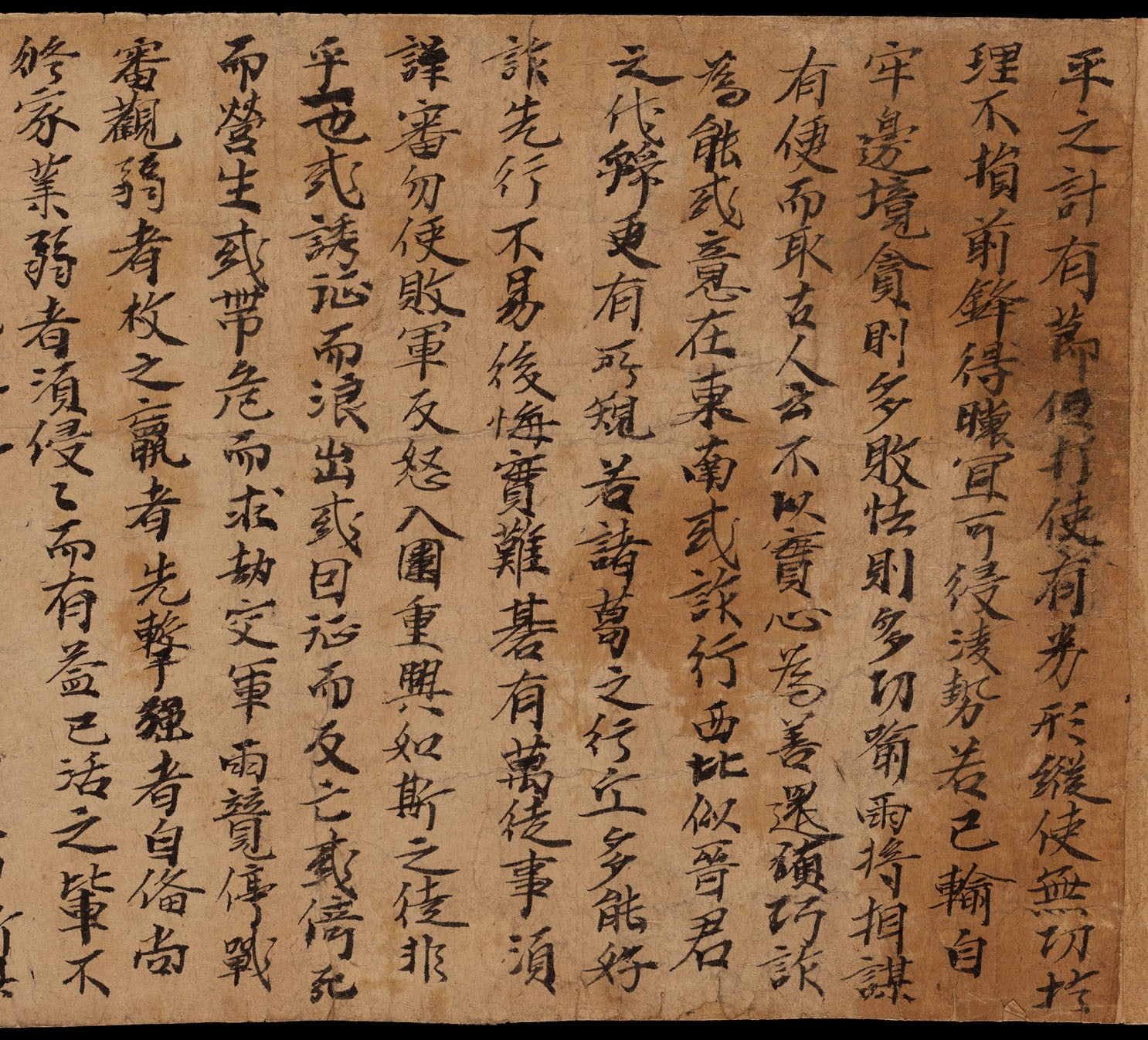
Opening section of the Dunhuang Go Manual at the British Library (Or.8210/S.5574)

The Dunhuang Go Manual or Dunhuang Go Classic or simply the Classic of Go (Chinese: 敦煌碁經; pinyin: Dūnhuáng Qíjīng) is the earliest surviving manual on the strategic board game of Go (Chinese: 圍棋; pinyin: wéiqí). Dating from the 6th century and written in Chinese, it exists as a single manuscript that was discovered in the 'Library Cave' of the Mogao Caves in Dunhuang, China by Aurel Stein in 1907, and which is now in the collection of the British Library in London, England.

== The British Library manuscript ==
The manuscript (Or.8210/S.5574) is a paper scroll 15.5 cm high and 240 cm long. The hand-written text comprises 159 lines of about 15–17 characters per line. The handwriting is cursive, and in places untidy and hard to read, with many obvious transcription errors. The manuscript is incomplete, with probably three to five lines of text (45–75 characters) missing at the beginning. The end of the manuscript is intact, and gives the title of the text as Qi Jing (碁經) "Classic of Go", and notes that it is complete in one scroll. Unfortunately the name of the author, which would probably have been given at the start of the text, is not provided.

The manuscripts in the Dunhuang library cave date from the 5th century up to the early 11th century, when the cave was sealed. Lionel Giles (1875–1958), the first scholar to recognise the contents of this manuscript, dates the manuscript to the late Tang dynasty, about 900 AD. However, it is believed that the text of the manual was composed during the late 6th century under the Northern Zhou dynasty (557–581). The main evidence for this is the fact that the author of the text refers to the black pieces as "crow pieces" (烏子) rather than "black pieces" (黑子). The explanation for this unusual term is that Yuwen Tai (507–556), father of the first emperor of the Northern Zhou, and posthumously honoured as the founding emperor of the dynasty, had the nickname 'Black Otter' (黑獺), and therefore the character 'black' (Chinese: 黑; pinyin: hēi) was tabooed in documents written during the Northern Zhou dynasty, being replaced by the word 'crow' (Chinese: 烏; pinyin: wū) which is a synonym for 'black' in Chinese.

At the end of the manuscript is a single line of Tibetan reading བན་དེ་སྦ་འྀ་འདྲིས་འོ༎ (ban de sba'i 'dris 'o), which has been interpreted as meaning "Written by the monk Ba". It is uncertain whether this means that the Chinese text was copied out by a Tibetan scribe, or whether a Tibetan monk added the line to the manuscript at a later date.

In September 2013, Wang Runan, the vice-chairman of the Chinese Weiqi Association, called for the Dunhuang Go Manual to be returned to China.

== Contents ==
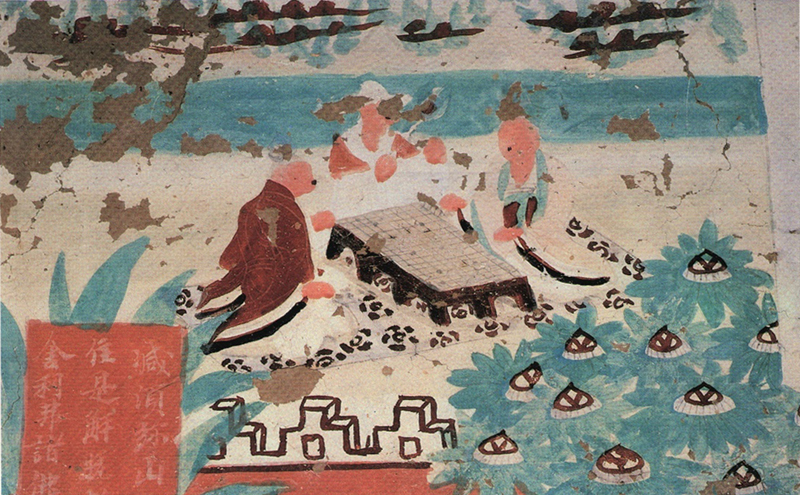
Mural illustrating the Vimalakirti Sutra dating to the Five Dynasties period (907–979) from Cave 32 at the Yulin Caves in Gansu, showing a game of Go being played. There is a similar mural at Dunhuang Cave 454.

The main text is divided into seven numbered sections. The number and title of the first section is missing, but it discusses general principles of attack and defence, suggesting that the player emulate famous military strategists such as Chen Ping and Zhuge Liang. It gives general advice such as "If greedy, one will often be defeated. If timid, one will rarely succeed" (貪則多敗，怯則少功).

The second section (誘征第二) explains the ladder strategy.

The third section (勢用篇第三) discusses good and bad shapes of groups of stones, and gives examples of live and dead shapes, for example noting that "bent four in the corner is dead at the end of the game" (角傍曲四，局竟乃亡).

The fourth section (像名弟四) discusses the symbolism of the Go board and the symbolic names given to different positions on the board. For example, the author states that "Go stones are round in imitation of the heavens, and the Go board is square in the same way that the earth is; that there are 361 intersections on the board reflects the division of the ecliptic [into 365 days]" (碁子圓以法天，碁局方以類地。碁有三百六十一道，倣周天之道數). The explicit mention here that a Go board has 361 points indicates that the author of the manual was familiar with the standard board with a 19 × 19 grid, and not the earlier 17 × 17 grid board that is attested in archaeological evidence dating back to the late Han dynasty (206 BCE – 220 CE) and from paintings dating up to the mid 8th century. A similar cosmological reading of the board is elaborated at greater length by the Song dynasty imperial Go attendant Li Yimin in his Wangyou Qingle Ji (忘清集), which describes the 360 playable intersections (excluding the centre) as corresponding to the days of the year, the four quadrants of 90 points each to the four seasons, and the 72 points along the board's edges to the hou (five-day units of the traditional calendar), with the black and white stones modelled on yin and yang.

The fifth section (釋圖勢篇弟五) discusses the importance of Go diagrams to mastering the game. It does not give any concrete examples of Go diagrams, but Cheng Enyuan (1917–1989) suggests that the original text of the manual would have included a set of accompanying diagrams illustrating game positions and strategy.

The sixth section (碁制篇弟六) discusses rules of behaviour when playing Go, for instance noting that "when a stone has been played it may not be moved again" (下子之法，不許再移). Cheng Enyuan notes that this section is very hard to understand as it uses some obscure technical terms and mentions some obsolete practices that are not found in modern Go. In particular it refers several times to the use of counting rods (Chinese: 籌; pinyin: chóu), but their exact role in the game is uncertain.

The seventh section (部袠篇弟七) discusses the classification of Go diagrams into four categories: famous games; cunning techniques; Ko fights and seki; and life and death shapes. It mentions "13 diagrams of Han dynasty Go games" and "24 diagrams of Eastern Wu Go games", which suggest that there was once a collection of early Go games, which the only surviving example of is a diagram of a game reputedly played between Sun Ce (175–200) and Lü Fan (died 228).

Following the main text is an unnumbered section oddly titled "Techniques of Go Faults" (碁病法), which appears to be a previously unknown text that the scribe added after the main text. Cheng Enyuan suggests that this section actually comprises two separate extracts from two different Go texts, the first which should be titled "Go Faults" (碁病) and the second which should be titled "Go Techniques" (碁法). The "Go Faults" part discusses three bad faults of Go-playing (sticking too close to the edge and corners; clumsily responding to an opponent's moves; and allowing groups to be cut off from each other) and two careless types of play (playing a stone hurriedly and without thought; and trying to save a dead group), as well as two ways of staying alive (moving out to the centre; and connecting in all directions) and two good habits (not being greedy in a weak position; and not being timid in a strong position). Cheng believes that the following "Go Techniques" part, which is written in a different style and is a more rounded discussion of Go strategy, may be an extract from a Go treatise by Emperor Wu of Liang (464–549) who is recorded to have written several works on Go.

Appended after this is a short text (16 lines) entitled Essential Commentary on Go (Chinese: 碁評要略; pinyin: qípíng yàolüè), ascribed to Emperor Wu of Liang, which gives some general strategic advice on playing the game. Although Emperor Wu's Commentary on Go is mentioned in bibliographies from the Tang dynasty through to the Ming dynasty, no extant editions of the text are known, and so the brief extract at the end of the Dunhuang manuscript is all that remains of this early Go treatise.

== See also ==
- History of Go
- Classic of Arts
- Go strategy and tactics
