= Irk Bitig =

9th-century manuscript book on divination

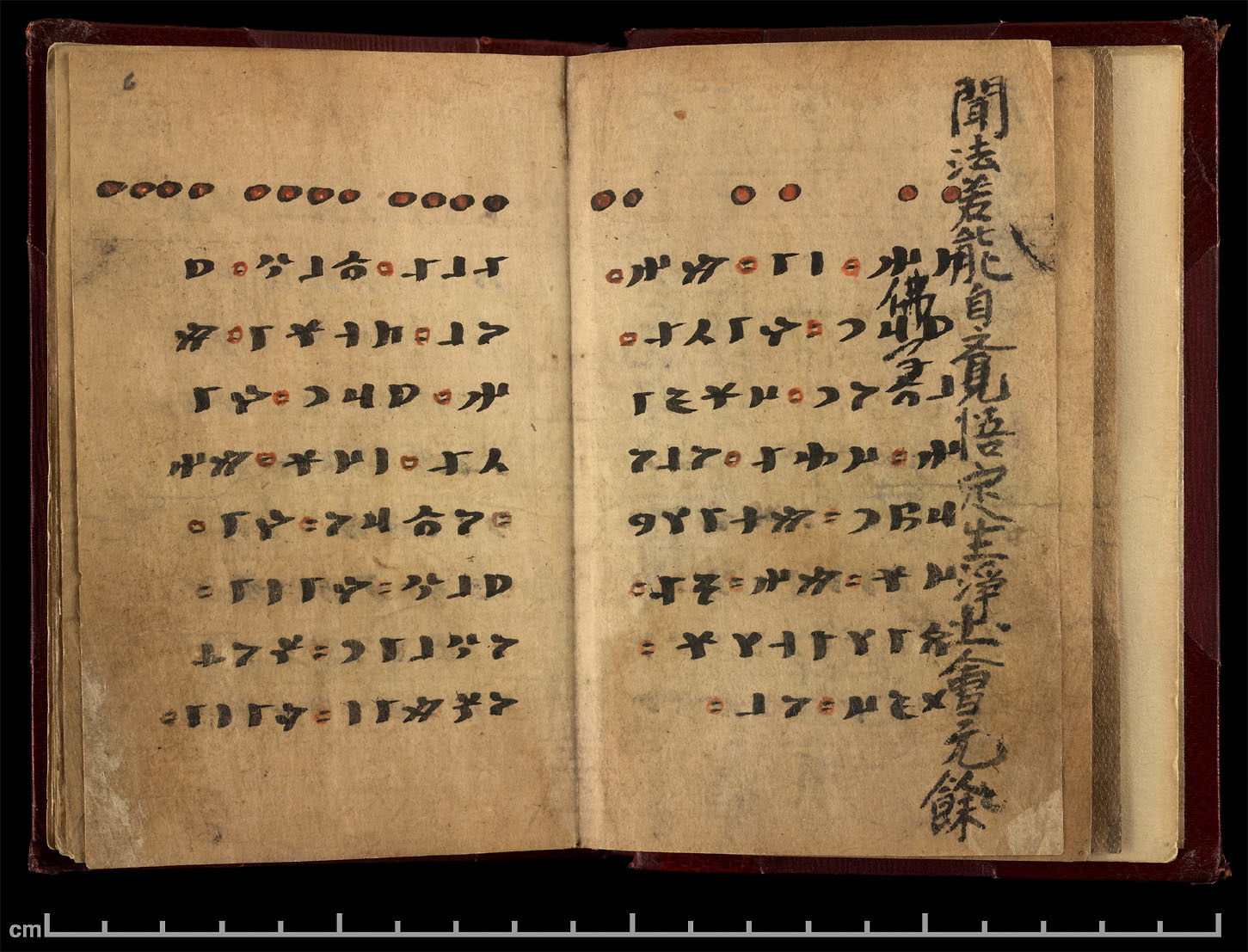
First two pages of the Irk Bitig (folios 5b and 6a).

Irk Bitig or Irq Bitig (Old Turkic: 𐰃𐰺𐰴 𐰋𐰃𐱅𐰃𐰏), known as the Book of Omens or Book of Divination in English, is a 9th-century manuscript book on divination that was discovered in the "Library Cave" of the Mogao Caves in Dunhuang, China, by Aurel Stein in 1907, and is now in the collection of the British Library in London, England. The book is written in Old Turkic using the Old Turkic script (also known as "Orkhon" or "Turkic runes"); it is the only known complete manuscript text written in the Old Turkic script. It is also an important source for early Turkic mythology.

== British Library manuscript ==
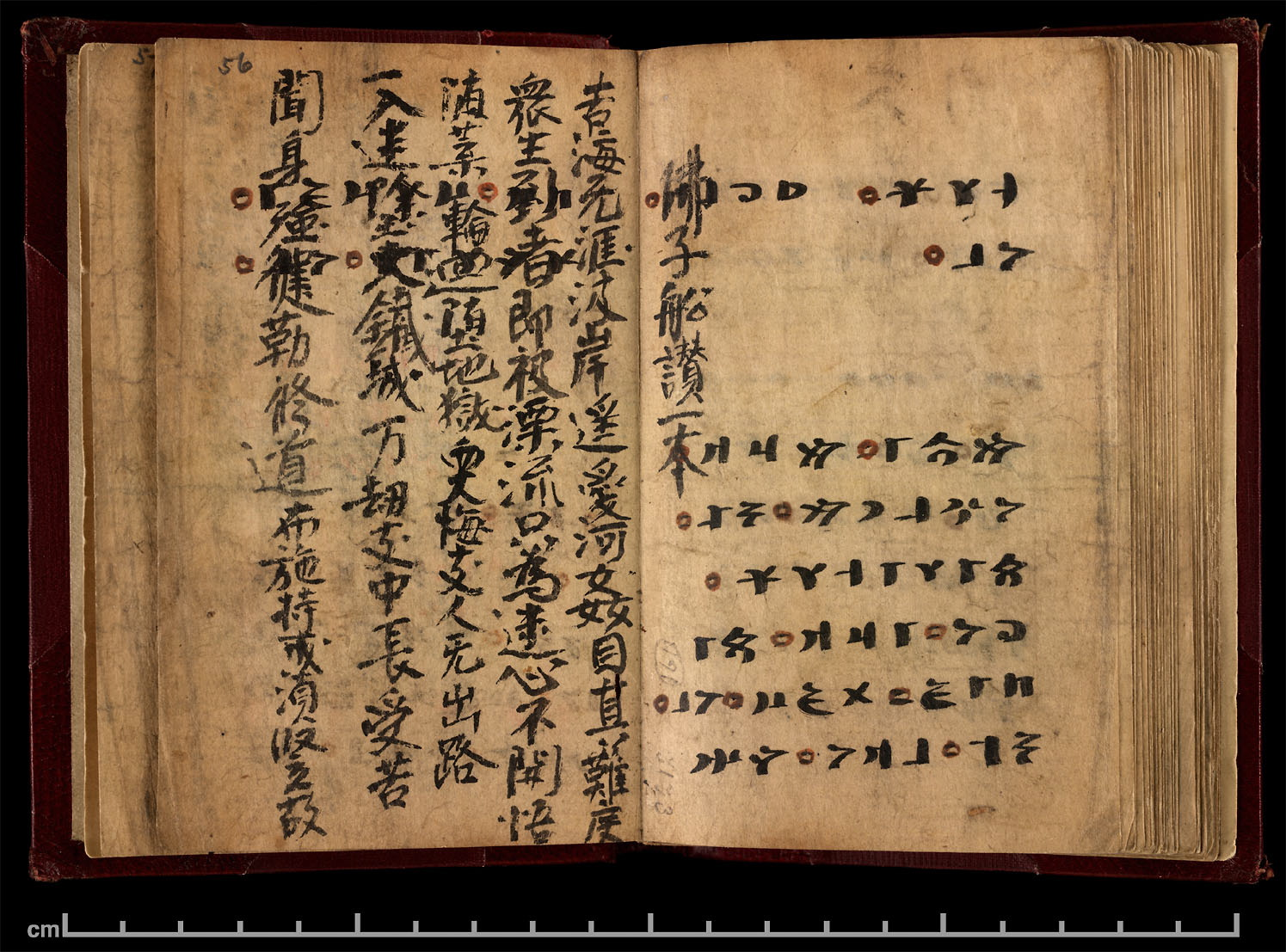
Last two pages of the main text of Irk Bitig (folios 55b and 56a), partially overwritten with Buddhist verses in Chinese.

The only extant version of the Irk Bitig is a manuscript from the Dunhuang Library Cave that is now held at the British Library (shelfmark Or.8212/161).

Stein entrusted the manuscript, together with three other Old Turkic manuscripts in runic script, to Vilhelm Thomsen for publication. Thomsen published the first edition of the text in 1912. It included a transliteration, an English translation, notes on problematic words, and a word list.

The manuscript is in the form of a booklet comprising 58 folios folded in half, each page being about 13.1 × 8.1 cm in size. The pages of the booklet turn to the right (opposite to that of Western books), and the Old Turkic text is laid out in horizontal right-to-left lines running top-to-bottom down the page. The text of Irk Bitig consists of 104 pages in 52 folios (folios 5b–57a), with 40–70 characters per page. The text is written in black ink with red punctuation marks marking word division, except for the colophon on the last two pages, which is written in red ink. The first four and a half folios (including one line overwriting the start of the Old Turkic text) and the last three folios (of which one and a half folios overwrite the Old Turkic colophon) are Buddhist devotional verses written in Chinese. As the Chinese text overwrites the beginning and end of the Old Turkic text, it is believed that the text of Irk Bitig was written first, and that the blank pages at the start and end of the booklet were later filled with the Chinese Buddhist verses.

The title by which the book is known, Irk Bitig, meaning "Book of Omens", is given at the bottom of the last page of the main text (folio 55b), but the author is not mentioned anywhere.

A number of transcription errors and textual omissions have been identified in the manuscript text, which suggest that it is not an original composition but a copy of an earlier text that was probably written in the Old Uyghur script. On the basis of its linguistic features, Marcel Erdal has dated the composition of the original work to the 8th and 9th centuries, among the earliest group of Old Turkic texts.

=== Date ===
The manuscript text is not precisely dated, but its colophon states that it was written on the 15th day of the second month of the year of the tiger at the Taygüntan (Chinese: 大雲堂; pinyin: Dàyúntáng) Manichaean monastery by an anonymous monk for his "elder brother", General İtaçuk (Saŋun İtaçuk). As the Library Cave was sealed in the early 11th century, it is thought that this year of the tiger must be sometime during the 9th or 10th centuries. Louis Bazin suggests that the year of the tiger could here be 930 or 942, but Gerard Clauson and Talat Tekin both date the manuscript to the 9th century (i.e. one of the years 810, 822, 834, 846, 858, 870, 882 or 894).

== Linguistic features ==
According to Annemarie von Gabain (1901–1993) the Irk Bitig is written in a "Manichaean" dialect of Old Turkic, reflecting the fact that it was written at a Manichaean monastery, but Clauson has noted that the language of this text is virtually identical to that of the corpus of secular inscriptions in the Old Turkic script from the Orkhon Valley, and so "Manichaean" is not a valid linguistic term.

The British Library manuscript exhibits a number of orthographic peculiarities that may reflect the dialect of its scribe. In particular, it uses the front vowel forms of the letter s 𐰾 and n 𐰤 in certain situations where a back vowel form of the letters would be expected. The manuscript also uses two signs, 𐱇 (used to write the word ot meaning "grass") and 𐰰 (used to represent a syllabic up or the letter p after the letter u), that are not attested in other manuscript texts or inscriptions.

The Old Turkic text does not have any sentence punctuation, but uses two black lines in a red circle as a word separation mark in order to indicate word boundaries.

== Contents ==
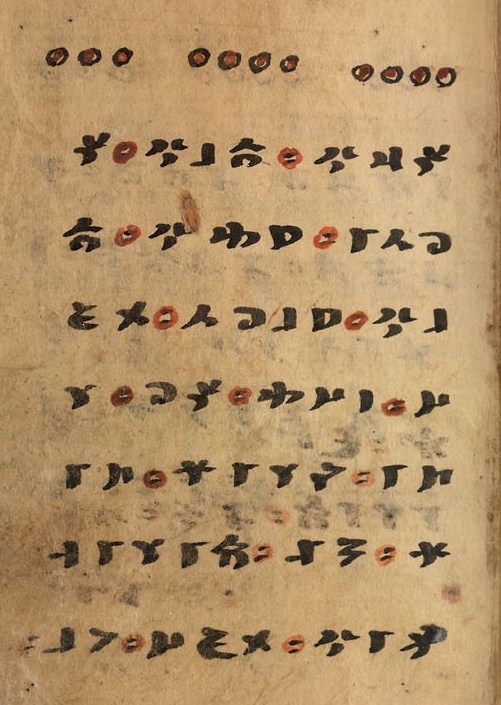
Omen 11 (4-4-3 dice) of the Irk Bitig (folio 13a): "There comes a messenger on a yellow horse (and) an envoy on a dark brown horse, bringing good tidings, it says. Know thus: (The omen) is extremely good."

The main text of the book comprises 65 sections, each representing a particular divination, which is headed by three groups of between one and four circles filled with red ink. These three groups of circles are the omen (ırk in Old Turkic) that are the subject of the divination, and are thought to represent the pips on a four-sided dice made from a rectangular piece of wood that would be thrown three times (or three such dice thrown once) as part of the divination ceremony. The groups of circles are followed by a short explanation of their meaning, such as "I am a white-spotted falcon. I enjoy sitting on a sandal-wood tree" (no.4), "A man comes hurriedly. He comes bringing good tiding" (no.7), and "An old ox was eaten by ants, gnawing around its belly. It lays down without being able to move" (no.37). After the explanation is a prognostication in the form "Know thus, it is ..." "good" (33 times), "very good" (7 times), "bad" (17 times) or "very bad" (2 times). In a few cases the prognostication after "know thus" is missing.

There are 64 combinations of three groups of one to four pips, but the book gives a total of sixty-five omens, with some errors, including two missing omens (3-1-1 and 1-2-4) and some duplicate omens (3-4-1 occurs three times, and 3-1-3 occurs twice).

The omens comprise short stories about the world in which the nomadic Turkic people lived. Animals feature prominently in most of the omens, sometimes domesticated animals such as horse and camels, and sometimes wild animals such as tigers and deer. When wild animals fight each other or are injured the omen is bad (nos. 6, 8, 37, 43, 44, 45, 46, and 61). Likewise, when domestic animals are mistreated, sick or stolen the omen is bad (nos. 16, 25, 39, 50, and 65). On the other hand, animals giving birth are good omens (nos. 5 and 41). A couple of the omens show a threefold pattern of parallelism between two animals and a human: a white mare, a she-camel and a princess give birth (no. 5); young birds, fawns, and children get lost in the fog (no. 15).

The Sky God Tengri is featured in some of the omens (nos. 12, 15, 17, 38, 41, 47, 54, 60), and he is normally shown to be benign, for instance rescuing lost or exhausted animals (nos. 15 and 17). Also featured is the god of the road, who bestows his favour on travellers (no. 2), and mends old things and brings order to the country (no. 48).

The title Khan also features in several omens, establishing a royal camp (no. 28), coming back from a victorious battle (no. 34), and going hunting (no. 63), which are all good omens. Omen 63 mentions the custom of the khan killing an animal with his own hands after it has been surrounded by his retinue.

After the final divination, the book concludes, "Now, my dear sons, know thus: this book of divination is good. Thus everyone is master of his own fate."

The divination text is written in a mix of prose and poetry, and although it does not have a fixed poetic metre, it does exhibit poetic features such as stylistic parallelism, alliteration and rhyme.

Number	Omen	Summary of the interpretation	Prognostication
1	2-2-2	The Son of Heaven sits on a golden throne.	good
2	4-4-4	The god of the road riding on a dappled horse bestows his favour on two travellers.	good
3	3-3-3	An eagle with golden wings catches and eats whatever it wants.	good
4	1-1-1	A white-spotted falcon perches in a sandalwood tree.	none
5	2-4-2	A chieftain sees a white mare, a white camel and the third princess giving birth.	very good
6	1-2-2	A bear and a boar fight together, and are both injured.	bad
7	2-1-2	A man arrives with good news.	good
8	1-2-3	A golden-headed snake.	bad
9	3-2-1	A big house burns down.	bad
10	2-4-3	A leopard yawns in the reeds.	none
11	4-4-3	Messengers on a yellow horse and a dark brown horse bring good news.	very good
12	3-4-3	A hunter falls over.	bad
13	3-4-2	An abandoned old woman stays alive by licking a greasy spoon.	none
14	2-3-4	A raven is tied to a tree.	none
15	1-4-1	Chicks, fawns and children lost in the fog are found safe after three years.	good
16	2-1-4	A fat horse is stolen.	bad
17	2-3-3	A horse that is lost in the desert finds grass to eat and water to drink.	good
18	2-4-1	A tent is in good condition.	very good
19	4-1-3	A white horse.	good
20	2-2-3	A white male camel.	good
21	3-3-1	An old hoopoe sings at the new year.	none
22	1-1-2	A woman drops her mirror in a lake.	distressing and very bad
23	4-4-2	A boy finds some eagle droppings.	good
24	3-1-3	A blind foal tries to suckle at a stallion.	bad
25	3-1-3	A yoke of oxen harnessed to a plough cannot move.	bad
26	4-2-1	The sun rises and shines on the world.	good
27	4-2-2	A sheep encounters a wolf but remains safe.	good
28	2-1-1	A khan rules a stable country, and has many good men at his court.	good
29	4-3-2	A butcher gains ninety sheep.	good
30	4-2-3	A poor man's son returns home after earning some money.	good
31	1-4-4	A tiger returns to its den after finding some prey.	good
32	1-1-3	A single meadowsweet shrub multiplies to become many thousand plants.	good
33	4-2-4	Some felt falls into the water.	bad
34	2-4-4	A khan returns victorious from battle.	good
35	4-3-4	A man returning from war encounters a swan who leads him home.	good
36	4-1-1	A man has no titles and a bad reputation.	very bad
37	1-3-4	An old ox is bitten by ants.	bad
38	3-1-4	Heaven decrees that a slave girl becomes a queen.	good
39	2-2-4	A roan horse is fettered and cannot move.	bad
40	4-4-1	A stout-hearted young man shoots an arrow that splits a rock.	good
41	3-2-4	A white-spotted cow gives birth to a white-spotted male calf.	good
42	4-1-4	A woman who has left her cups and bowls behind returns and finds them where she left them.	good
43	3-3-4	A falcon hunting water birds encounters an eagle.	bad
44	1-4-2	A hawk pounces on a rabbit, but it injures its claws and the rabbit escapes.	bad
45	1-3-2	A fawn is without grass and water.	bad
46	1-3-3	A camel is stuck in a marsh, and is eaten by a fox.	bad
47	1-1-4	A man encounters a god who wishes him plentiful livestock and long life.	good
48	3-4-4	The old god of the road who mends things brings order to the country.	none
49	3-4-1	A tiger encounters a wild goat, but the goat escapes down a cliff.	good
50	1-4-3	A roan horse and a bay horse are made to run until they are exhausted.	bad
51	4-3-3	An eagle summers on a green rock, and winters on a red rock.	none
52	3-1-2	When a man is depressed and the sky is cloudy the sun comes out.	good
53	2-3-2	It rains and the grass grows.	good
54	1-3-1	A slave speaks to his master; a raven speaks to heaven.	good
55	4-1-2	A man goes to war, and makes a name for himself.	very good
56	2-3-1	A stallion summers beneath the nut trees, and winters beneath the trees where the birds roost.	good
57	2-2-1	A girl's lover has died, and the water in her pail has frozen.	painful to start with, and good later
58	3-2-2	A son who argued with his parents runs away and later comes back home.	good
59	3-2-3	Something to do with not making a "year stink" (?) or a "month go bad" (?).	good
60	4-3-1	A stag with nine-pronged antlers bellows.	good
61	3-4-1	A crane lands but is caught in a snare.	bad
62	2-1-3	A yargun (?) deer climbs the mountains during the summer.	good
63	1-2-1	The khan went hunting and caught a roe buck.	good
64	3-4-1	A grey falcon with a white neck sits on a rock, and summers in a poplar tree.	very good
65	3-3-2	A fat horse has a hard mouth that will not heal.	bad

== See also ==
- Book of Dede Korkut
- Dīwān Lughāt al-Turk
- Mo (divination)
