= Sutra of the Great Virtue of Wisdom =

5th-century Chinese manuscript from the Mogao Caves, Dunhuang, China

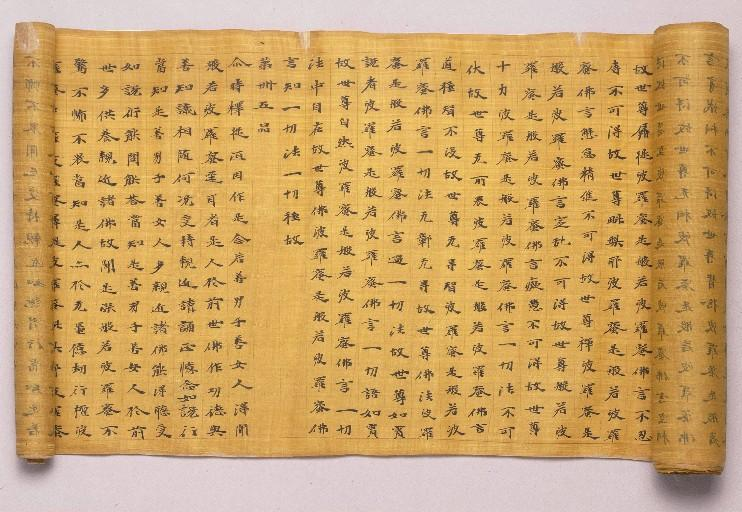
The Sutra of the Great Virtue of Wisdom (National Library of France Pelliot chinois 4504)

Sutra of the Great Virtue of Wisdom (Chinese: 摩訶般若波羅蜜經), also known as the Mahaprajmaparamita Sutra, is a 5th-century Chinese manuscript on silk brought from the Mogao Caves in Dunhuang, China. It was brought to Europe by Paul Pelliot (1878–1945), and it is now housed at the National Library of France in Paris.
