= History of Standard Chinese =

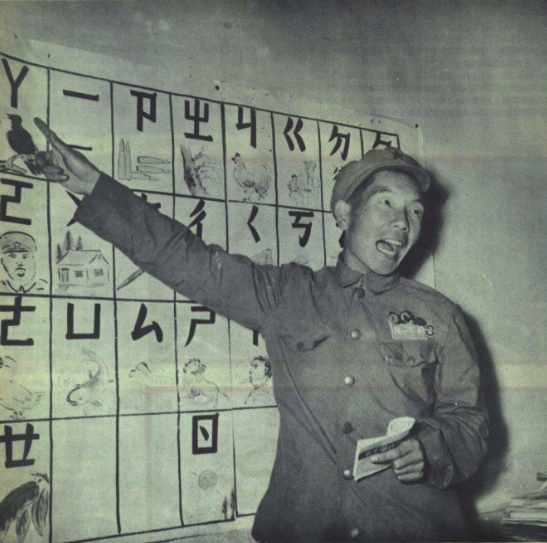
Qi Jianhua, an early educator of the People's Republic of China, using Zhuyin symbols to instruct on Standard Chinese pronunciation

Standard Chinese is a standard form of Mandarin Chinese with official status in the People's Republic of China (where the language is known as "common speech" Putonghua 普通话), the Republic of China (Taiwan) (where it is called "National language" Guoyu 國語), and Singapore (which names it Huayu 华语 or "Chinese language"). Various governing authorities in the course of the 20th century adopted this variety of Chinese as a standard register and promoted its use, giving it its current status as a standard language.

While earlier Chinese lingua francas based on the dialects of previous Chinese capitals had existed in Chinese history, the Modern Standard Mandarin which gained prominence in the 19th century is based on the dialect of Beijing, with some modifications.

== Background ==
The Chinese language has always consisted of a wide variety of dialects; hence prestige dialects and linguae francae have always been needed. Confucius (c. 551 – c. 479 BC) referred to yayan 'elegant speech' modeled on the dialect of the Zhou dynasty royal lands rather than regional dialects; texts authored during the Han dynasty (202 BC – 220 AD) also refer to tongyu (通語 'common language'). Rime dictionaries written since the Southern and Northern dynasties (420–589) likely also reflected systems of standard pronunciation. However, these standard dialects were largely unknown outside of the educated elite; even among the elite, pronunciations may have differed widely; this was enabled by the unifying factor of Literary Chinese as a written standard regardless of the dialect spoken. The rime dictionaries placed great emphasis on preserving archaic features that had been lost in contemporary speech. Therefore, the standards in these dictionaries did not reflect a single dialect spoken at any one point of time but were always composites of features from different sources to reflect an ideal pronunciation. The language of the literate ruling class was known as yayan (Zhou), tongyu (Han dynasty), and guanyun (Sui, Tang and Song dynasties), and mastery of these linguistic standards were necessary for upward advancement.

Apart from the common language, local varieties of Chinese, especially in Southern China, also developed their own distinct literary readings. These are spoken pronunciations for written Chinese based on the prestige dialect at each point in history (e.g. Luoyang, Chang'an, or Beijing). Throughout the history of Chinese, educated people would be trained in their formal education to read aloud using these pronunciations based on the prestige dialect.

Yuan dynasty North China developed a lingua franca known as Han'er Yuyan. Yuan era scholar Zhou Deqing published a book detailing a standard spoken Chinese, named Zhongyuan Yayin (Elegant pronunciation of the Central Plains), meant to represent the common spoken language rather than the "correct" literary pronunciation reflected in the Song dictionaries. This book became the standard speech of northern Chinese theatre forms. During the flight of the Song literati to the South after the Jurchen conquest, Neo-Confucians began to fixate on the idea of restoring "correct" pronunciation as it was believed to be spoken by the ancients. As a result, the subsequent rime dictionaries such as the Ming dynasty's Hongwu Zhengyun 洪武正韵 reflected the "ideal" pronunciations and deviated from the actual spoken pronunciations. This idealised standard differed from the Yuan dynasty's Zhongyuan Yayin which more closely reflected contemporary speech.

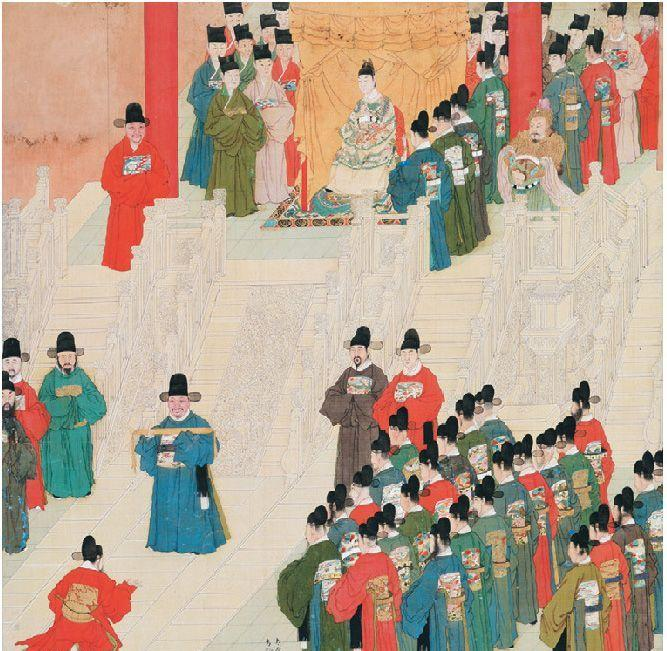
The term Mandarin/Guanhua was first coined to describe the common language of Ming dynasty officials

Ming scholar Lu Kun criticised the Hongwu Zhengyun as too distant from the "elegant pronunciation of middle China" and was not actually spoken by court officials. The actual court lingua franca from the Ming dynasty was rather based on the Nanjing dialect with some other non-Jianghuai Mandarin influences. The Ming (1368–1644) and Qing dynasties (1644–1912) began to use the term Guanhua (官話) 'official speech' to refer to the dialect used at the courts. The existence of Guanhua was already known to Europeans by the time of Matteo Ricci, who worked in China from 1582 to 1610. Ricci wrote of "a spoken language common to the whole Empire, known as the Quonhua, an official language for civil and forensic use".

== Emergence of a Beijing-based standard ==
=== Qing era origins ===
It seems that during the early part of this period, the standard was based on the Nanjing dialect, but later the Beijing dialect became increasingly influential, despite the mix of officials and commoners speaking various dialects in the capital, Beijing. Unlike other forms of Mandarin, Beijing phonology is notable for redistributing the ancient checked tone syllables with voiceless initials into all other tones in a seemingly random fashion, rather than maintaining the original tonal categories. Linguists suggest that the reassignment of the checked tone syllables indicates dialectal admixture: verbs and colloquialisms tend towards yinping tone (as in Ji-Lu Mandarin), standalone nouns favour shang (similar to Northeastern Mandarin), while literary pronunciations have qu or yangping (the former seemingly an attempt to imitate Nanjing, the latter probably based on Central Plains Mandarin). Many of these yinping and yangping pronunciations first appeared in the 19th or early 20th century, replacing older pronunciations.

Beijing Mandarin was heavily influenced by the language of the Manchu elite of Beijing; Beijing Mandarin contained a number of Manchu grammatical features that could not be found in other forms of Mandarin. Due to the Manchu influences in Beijing Mandarin, late Qing Manchus (who frequently could not speak Manchu) took Beijing dialect as their mother tongue, setting them apart from provincials and even from the Han Bannermen, who retained a Liaodong dialect.

Despite the shift from Nanjing to Beijing-based pronunciation, the ascendant Beijing Mandarin largely followed the syntax of earlier forms of Guanhua. Beijing Mandarin (北京官話) was considered to be distinct from the Beijing dialect (京話, "speech of the capital"), and Beijing Mandarin was also divided between the more colloquial "true Mandarin" (真官話) and the more ceremonial "cultured speech" (文話). This historical "Beijing Mandarin" was quite close to modern Standard Chinese. The baihua (vernacular) grammar and the vocabulary of the historical Mandarin was largely the same as in modern Standard Chinese. On the other hand, the historical Mandarin language used many honorifics which have mostly disappeared in modern-day Mandarin daily speech, such as jian (賤 '[my] humble') and guì (貴 '[your] honorable').

=== Shift in pronunciation standards ===
Until the late Qing period, the official standard in books and manuals was still a synthetic Mandarin with classical features such as the checked tone that were preserved only in Southern China. Only one author, Gao Jingting, spoke of Beijing as the standard, although his 1810 book simply depicted Beijing idioms spoken with the synthetic pronunciation. However, in court practice, Beijing Mandarin had replaced the "elegant pronunciation of the Central Plain" as the pronunciation of court ceremonies by the 18th century. For instance, in 1752, the Court of State Ceremonial decided to recruit officials only from the graduates of Zhili (modern Hebei), and particularly Shuntian Prefecture, around Beijing, for their pronunciation. In 1728, the Qing authorities set up orthoepy academies (正音書院; Zhèngyīn shūyuàn) in an attempt to make pronunciation conform to the court standard, as the Yongzheng Emperor had complained about his difficulty understanding court officials from the southern provinces Guangdong and Fujian. These attempts generated some interest in Mandarin instruction in the south, driving a wave of Mandarin textbook publishing and children's lessons. However, most academies closed down rapidly, with only one exception in Shaowu which lasted until the 1890s. Ethnic Manchus and other Bannermen formed the primary pool of language teachers and textbook compilers since the Yongzheng edict on language instruction. Still, Thomas Taylor Meadows observed that knowledge of Mandarin had become widespread in 1840s Guangzhou, even among the lower classes. Nevertheless, the fact that the court language was different from the classical standards affected its prestige; Yuen Ren Chao's family reportedly considered Beijing speech as a "maidservant language", while southern Chinese scholars pointed out that their speech was closer to classical pronunciation and better for studying Confucian classics.

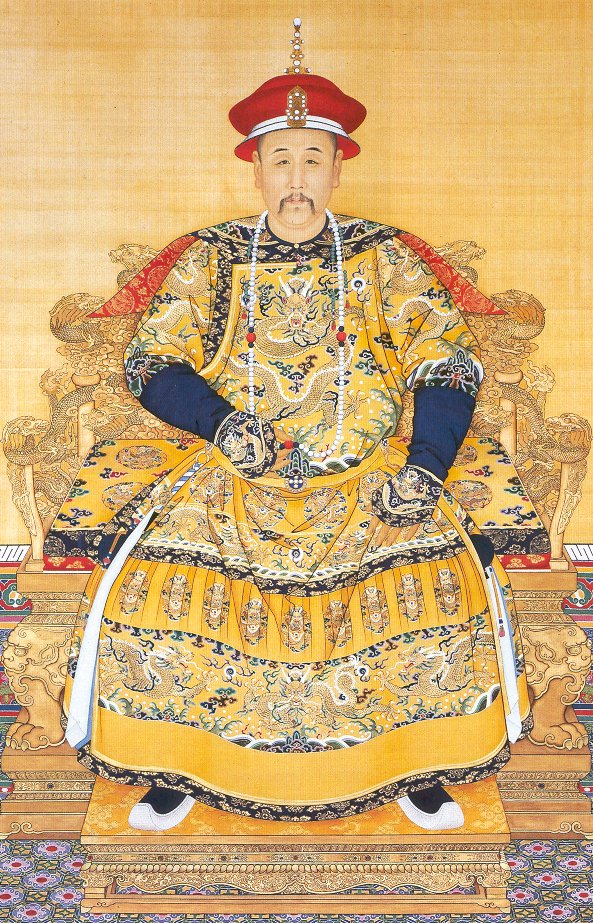
The Yongzheng Emperor, unable to understand the accent of southern officials, ordered instruction in a standard pronunciation.

Foreign observers continued to esteem southern variants of Mandarin over Beijing's. The 1703 missionary grammar book Arte de La Lengua Mandarina still treated Beijing Mandarin as a local variant of Mandarin, and the 1716 Japanese textbook Tōwa Sanyō declared Nanjing Mandarin and Hangzhou dialect as the prestige dialects of Chinese. As late as 1815, Robert Morrison based the first English–Chinese dictionary on the lower Yangtze koiné as the standard of the time, though he conceded that the Beijing variant was gaining in influence.

By the middle of the 19th century, the Beijing variant had become dominant and was essential for any business with the imperial court. The new standard was described in grammars produced by Joseph Edkins (1864), Thomas Wade (1867) and Herbert Giles (1873). Edkins suggested that Nanjing Mandarin was still more widely understood but Beijing Mandarin was more fashionable. Wade argued in his preface to his book on Mandarin that Beijing Mandarin was most crucial for foreign interpreters to learn due to the Foreign Legations being stationed there, and the growing influence of Beijing Mandarin on all other forms of Mandarin which made it more widely understood. Apart from Beijing being the residence of the diplomats, another important factor for the linguistic shift was the decline of Nanjing after its devastation during the mid-century Taiping Rebellion. Nevertheless, there were objections; German linguist Georg von der Gabelentz criticized the Beijing dialect and considered the Nanjing variant more suitable for science.

Only in recent times has the northern dialect, pek-kuān-hoá, in the form [spoken] in the capital, kīng-hoá, begun to strive for general acceptance, and the struggle seems to be decided in its favor. It is preferred by the officials and studied by the European diplomats. Scholarship must not follow this practise. The Peking dialect is phonetically the poorest of all dialects and therefore has the most homophones. This is why it is most unsuitable for scientific purposes. —Chinesische Grammatik (1881)

As late as the early 20th century, the position of Nanjing Mandarin was considered higher than that of Beijing by some and the postal romanization standard set in 1906 included spellings with elements of Nanjing pronunciation.

Yuan Shikai, a key supporter of the pre-Republic Mandarin movement.

The sense of Guoyu as a specific language variety promoted for general use by the citizenry was originally borrowed from Japan; in 1902 the Japanese Diet had formed the National Language Research Council to standardize a form of the Japanese language dubbed kokugo (国語). Reformers in the Qing bureaucracy took inspiration and borrowed the term into Chinese, and in 1909 the Qing education ministry officially proclaimed Mandarin as Guoyu (國語) the 'national language', a term which they used interchangeably with Mandarin (Guanhua), while promoting its instruction empire-wide. By this decade, the general consensus among government officials and reformists was that the Beijing pronunciation should be used as the standard, modelling after Japan's choice of the Tokyo accent. In imitation of the Japanese kana script, the Qing government in 1904 also adopted reformer Wang Zhao's Mandarin Syllabary, a phonetic system for indicating the pronunciation of Beijing dialect. The Ministry also published a Constitutional Agenda in 1909, which announced compulsory Mandarin education from the Upper Primary levels, the first attempt of any Chinese government to establish compulsory Mandarin lessons. In January 1911, months before the revolution that toppled the Qing, the Qing Ministry of Education announced the creation of a National Language Research Commission, but this plan was never completed. Revolutionary literary scholars in the last years of the Qing, such as Zhang Binglin and Wu Zhihui, continued to oppose the use of a Beijing-based standard. They argued for a composite common speech based on the dialects of Nanjing and other central regions of China.

=== Republican era codification ===
Diagram explaining tone values in Old National Pronunciation

After the Republic of China was established in 1912, there was more success in promoting a common national language. Apart from Beijing and Nanjing, the Wuhan dialect and Shanghainese were also proposed as the new standard language. A Commission on the Unification of Pronunciation was convened with delegates from the entire country, who were chosen based as often on political considerations as often as on linguistic expertise. The conference deadlocked between promoters of northern and southern pronunciation standards and as a result, a compromise was produced, later known as the Old National Pronunciation. The Dictionary of National Pronunciation (國音詞典) was published, which attempted compromise between Beijing's and other regions' dialects: it preserved the checked tone that had disappeared in Mandarin, as well as some consonantal endings from southern varieties and consonantal onsets from Wu. Ultimately, this attempt at synthesis was abandoned in favor of a pronunciation based on the Beijing dialect.

Hu Shih, a key language reformer and advocate of linguistic standardisation based on the Beijing accent

Originally, intellectuals such Qian Xuantong, Peng Qingpeng, and Liu Fu had supported the idea of a synthesis of different elements into Beijing Mandarin to create a genuinely national form of speech, comparing the composite nature to Esperanto, although their opponents called it "fabricated Mandarin" or "blue-green Mandarin" (an expression meaning "neither here nor there"). Critics argued that if the national government could represent the entire nation, the language of the seat of government could also represent the entire nation, in line with use of the Tokyo Yamanote dialect and Parisian French for national standards. The Old National Pronunciation also combined various phonological features which were historically or diatopically contradictory, making the standard unsuitable for use. Due to the problems caused by the lack of native speakers for the composite Old National Pronunciation, members of the Preparatory Committee on the Unification of the National Language in 1925 (including many who had supported the hybrid pronunciation) proposed to standardise the pronunciation on the speech of middle school-educated Beijing residents. In 1927, Chiang Kai Shek, who had recently captured central China after the Northern Expedition, ordered all official communication, education and media to switch to Beijing-based speech as the new standard pronunciation.

Meanwhile, vernacular literature continued to develop apace, despite the lack of a standardized pronunciation. Gradually, the members of the National Language Commission came to settle upon the Beijing dialect which became the major source of standard national pronunciation, due to Beijing's status as a prestige dialect. In 1932, the commission published the Vocabulary of National Pronunciation for Everyday Use (國音常用字彙), with little fanfare or official pronunciation. This dictionary was similar to the previously published Old National Pronunciation, except that it normalized the pronunciations for all characters to the pronunciation of the Beijing dialect. Despite efforts by some factions to recognize and promote southern Chinese varieties as well, the Kuomintang strongly promoted Guoyu as the one national language and censored and arrested opponents of this movement, continuing this through the wartime years. Elements from other dialects continue to exist in the standard language, but as exceptions rather than the rule. The 1932 standard was based on the speech of educated Beijing residents, and uses more yangping tone for the old voiceless checked tone syllables (seemingly imitations of Central Plains Mandarin) than previous and later codifications of Beijing Mandarin. This list remains the standard used in Taiwan.

== Implementation of a national standard ==
=== Promotional efforts in the Republic ===
In 1932, the Republic of China banned the use of non-standard Chinese in films. However, until 1936 the rule was completely ignored in Guangdong, which was under the rule of a rival regime. Guangdong province saw particularly strong resistance to Standard Chinese, as "chauvinism" within the province drove the idea that Cantonese could compete to become the common language of the trading ports and beyond. There is a myth, prevalent among speakers of Yue Chinese, that Cantonese lost to Beijing Mandarin in a narrow vote on the language of the new Republic of China. Linguist Yao Dehuai of the Hong Kong Chinese Language Society said in October of 1998:

There has long been a popular belief in Hong Kong that when the "national language" was approved in the early years of the Republic of China, Cantonese lost to the Beijing dialect by a single vote. An examination of historical facts reveals that this claim is unfounded and untrue. It's common and unsurprising for these and other popular beliefs to circulate. However, it is truly regrettable that such a legend has even circulated within Hong Kong language academic circles, and that some scholars, without any verification, have endorsed it out of their professional standing.

The Nationalist government took over control of Guangdong from the warlord Chen Jitang in 1936, and began attempting to impose Standard Chinese in schools.

During World War II, the Education Ministry sent Guoyu teachers to Guangdong and Fujian in the summer of 1938, but shortly after, the fall of Wuhan and Guangdong stopped these lessons and left the teachers unpaid. The Japanese puppet regime of Wang Jingwei also promoted Standard Mandarin education, citing the need for unified language to support a unified national purpose. The collaborationist authorities issued regulations requiring all teachers to conduct classes in Standard Chinese. The resisting armies, as they retreated inland to Sichuan, were also forced to use more Standard Mandarin due to the flood of refugees from different provinces who could not otherwise understand each other. Refugees from more distant provinces also became familiar with the Sichuan Mandarin dialects, which eased their learning of Standard Mandarin despite the lack of official resources to teach the language during this time. By the end of the war, Standard Mandarin could be heard in places like Guangzhou, where it had been absent before the invasion.

When the Chinese Nationalists took over administration of Taiwan after the war, the problem of imposing Standard Mandarin as the common language of Taiwan was as problematic as it had been in the mainland. One local news editorial, defending local Taiwanese from accusations of subservience to Japan, noted that the Mainlanders who could not speak Standard Mandarin outnumbered the local Taiwanese who could not speak it. Teachers sent to Taiwan were poorly qualified and began teaching in a chaotic mixture of "Mandarin" variants influenced by Jiangsu or Zhejiang Wu, Guangdong Yue, or Fujian Min, or in some cases teaching in Shanghainese or other dialects directly. Other teachers still used Old National Pronunciation, and some local teachers continued to teach in Japanese despite a ban on its use. According to a 1947 report, Taiwanese protested that they were willing to learn Standard Mandarin but teachers taught too many variations of it and Mainlanders could not understand each other. The Nationalist government adopted a mantra of "dialect as the foundation of Guoyu", which involved a policy of teaching Mandarin through comparative lessons with the local Southern Min. This mantra was built on the official insistence that Taiwanese Southern Min was "a form of the national language" and not a foreign language. The method proved useful for middle-aged and older Taiwanese who were still familiar with Southern Min, but not successful for younger Taiwanese who had been educated in Japanese. In 1954, after the Nationalist defeat in Mainland China, language instruction in Taiwan shifted to the Mandarin Experimental Primary School (MEPS) method, which was modelled on foreign language courses in Western countries and banned the use of other languages in class.

=== Implementation in the People's Republic ===
Rural literacy class using Zhuyin symbols. The Standard Chinese pronunciation of the name of Chairman Mao Zedong is displayed on the board. Pu'er, Yunnan.

The government of the People's Republic of China, established in 1949, continued the effort. In 1955, Guoyu was renamed Putonghua (普通話 'common speech') in a new campaign for language standardisation. The new name was meant to distance the standard language from the nation-state and the urban privilege associated with the term Guoyu. The term Putonghua had been used as early as the late Qing dynasty as a synonym of Guanhua/Guoyu, but during the Republican era, leftist intellectuals promoted the term Putonghua to critique what they saw as a top-down and authoritarian connotation with the name Guoyu. Putonghua also carried an additional connotation of denoting a popular, colloquial manner of speech, as opposed to the more bureaucratic style of Guoyu. The Republic of China on Taiwan continues to refer to Standard Chinese as Guoyu. Since then, the standards used in mainland China and Taiwan have diverged somewhat, though they continue to remain essentially identical, except for variations in newer vocabulary, and a little in pronunciation.

As late as the mid-1950s, there were still proposals to create a composite Standard Chinese phonology by adding back phonological distinctions which had disappeared in Beijing. In 1956, the PRC officially defined Standard Chinese as "the standard form of Modern Chinese with the Beijing phonological system as its norm of pronunciation, and Northern dialects as its base dialect, and looking to exemplary modern works in written vernacular Chinese for its grammatical norms." According to the official definition, Standard Chinese uses:

- The phonology of the Beijing dialect, if not always with each phoneme having the precise phonetic values as those heard in Beijing.
- The vocabulary of Mandarin dialects in general, excepting what are deemed to be slang and regionalisms. The vocabulary of all Chinese varieties, especially in more technical fields like science, law, and government, is very similar—akin to the profusion of Latin and Greek vocabulary in European languages. This means that much of the vocabulary of Standard Chinese is shared with all varieties of Chinese. Much of the colloquial vocabulary of the Beijing dialect is not considered part of Standard Chinese, and may not be understood by people outside Beijing.
- The grammar and idioms of exemplary modern Chinese literature, a form known as written vernacular Chinese. Written vernacular Chinese is loosely based upon a synthesis of predominantly northern grammar and vocabulary, with southern and Literary elements. This distinguishes Standard Chinese from the dialect heard on the streets of Beijing.

In practice, the linguistic standard adopted in the PRC had less tolerance for pronunciation variations than the Beijing vernacular dialect. The location chosen as the model for Putonghua pronunciation was not actually in Beijing, but in Luanping County, located in between the capital and Chengde, a summer resort for Qing dynasty aristocrats. Luanping was chosen as it was deemed to have more 'straightforward' tone contours, less erhua, and less syllable consolidation as compared to urban Beijing speech. As compared to earlier standards of Beijing Mandarin, the standard used in the PRC tends to have more yinping pronunciations for the ancient voiceless checked tone syllables (aligning with the colloquial layer derived from Ji-Lu Mandarin).

Despite its early head start, Standard Chinese was slow to spread in China and met with frequent interruptions in implementation, especially during the Cultural Revolution. One observer in the early 1980s found that the majority of language teachers refused to use Standard Chinese, considering it optional or "extraneous". A government study in 1984 found that only 50% of Chinese could communicate in Standard Chinese, ranging from 54% in the north to 40% in south. 10% of China's population at the time could not understand Standard Chinese news broadcasts. A new trajectory for Standard Chinese medium education began in the 1980s when teachers began to be put through standard Chinese proficiency tests and remedial training. Television channels and movies were issued new regulations in 1987 to shift gradually to Standard Chinese. Another government study at the beginning of the 21st century found that only 53% of the population could speak Standard Chinese (including those who spoke with incorrect pronunciation); the percentage rose to 70% in 2013.

In both mainland China and Taiwan, the use of Mandarin as the medium of instruction in the educational system and in the media has contributed to the spread of Mandarin. As a result, Standard Chinese is now spoken fluently by most people in mainland China and in Taiwan. After the handovers of Hong Kong and Macau, the term Putonghua is used in the special administrative regions of China and pinyin is widely used for teaching of Putonghua. However, in Hong Kong and Macau, due to historical and linguistic reasons, the language of education and both formal and informal speech remains Cantonese despite the growing use of Standard Chinese. At the beginning of the 21st century, one third of Hong Kong's population declared some proficiency in Standard Mandarin, and the figure rose to 48% by 2012.

== Impact outside of Chinese territory ==
=== Use in British Hong Kong ===
In 1938, as WWII began, the Nationalist Chinese Education Ministry dispatched Guoyu teachers to far flung regions, including forty-nine teachers sent to Hong Kong. However, Hong Kongers showed little interest in learning more than a few phrases: some regarded Guoyu as a "modern" curiosity which they learnt "if they felt like it", while others reportedly "regard Guoyu with contempt". Half of the teachers gave up within a year. However, as the war continued, surging patriotic fervour among Overseas Chinese created a sharp rise in demand for Guoyu films, starting with Mulan Joins the Army (1939), starring the Guoyu-speaking Cantonese actress Chen Yunshang, who was based in Hong Kong. This trend, together with the large numbers of non-Cantonese refugees moving into Hong Kong, eroded the dominance of Cantonese.

In the immediate post-WWII period, Standard Mandarin was taught in all government-funded schools of British Hong Kong's education system. At this time, 46% of Hong Kong's population spoke non-Cantonese varieties of Chinese. However, in the late 1950s, the subject was removed from primary education due to a shortage of teachers; in 1965, the subject was removed from Hong Kong's secondary education examinations. In 1962, Hong Kong's Secretary for Chinese Affairs indicated that it was Cantonese that should be promoted as the medium of communication among newcomers to Hong Kong. Nevertheless, the written language of Hong Kong, including in all education, was not written Cantonese (which was disallowed in schools) but Written Standard Chinese, a local written version of Standard Chinese.

During the debate prior to the passing of the 1974 Official Language Bill which granted "Chinese language" (which remained undefined) an equal status to English, a demand was raised to declare Mandarin as equal in status to Cantonese. Upon receiving this request, the colonial authority stressed that no spoken dialect should be discriminated against, but did not respond further.

=== Application in Singapore ===
A Singapore Simplified Chinese character, replacing the traditional character 無 but differing from mainland China's simplified character 无. Unique forms of simplified characters were used in Singapore from 1969 to 1976.

The use of Standard Chinese (then referred to as Guoyu) became popularised in Chinese schools in Singapore after China's 1919 May Fourth Movement. The spread of Standard Chinese in Chinese schools was driven by the enthusiastic efforts of the Chinese clan associations, especially the Singapore Hokkien Huay Kuan. By 1935, Standard Mandarin universally replaced other Chinese varieties in Singapore Chinese schools. The shift to Standard Mandarin occurred despite the colonial authorities' 1923 Annual Report on Education encouraging and offering grants to educate Chinese in "domestic dialects or dialects which they understand" and denying grants to Mandarin instruction (prior to this report, the colonial government funded only English and Malay education, not funding education in any variety of Chinese). Standard Mandarin gained official status in 1955, when Mandarin was made one of the four languages of the new Singapore Legislative Assembly. Mandarin became one of the four official languages of the Republic of Singapore with the 1965 Singapore Independence Act. However, Mandarin lost its prestige to English over the years, due to the unbridled dominance of English in administration and the greater economic, social, and political power of English; by 1978, the Singapore government reported that the majority of students fared badly in reading Mandarin books, newspapers and in examinations.

In response, the Speak Mandarin Campaign was launched by then Prime Minister Lee Kuan Yew in 1979. The campaign seeks to encourage the use of Mandarin and to discourage the use of non-Mandarin Chinese varieties, characterising the latter as 'burdens,' as summarized in Goh Chok Tong's (then First Deputy Prime Minister) speech marking the 1986 Speak Mandarin Campaign:

Parents know that our bilingual education system is here to stay, when they drop dialects in conversation with their children they are recognising that the continued use of dialects will add to the learning burden of their children.

== See also ==
- History of the Chinese language
