= Chinese postal romanization =

Chinese transliteration system (1892–2002)

Postal romanization: 郵政式拼音
- Script type: Alphabet romanization
- Period: 1892–2002
- Languages: Chinese

Chinese postal romanization
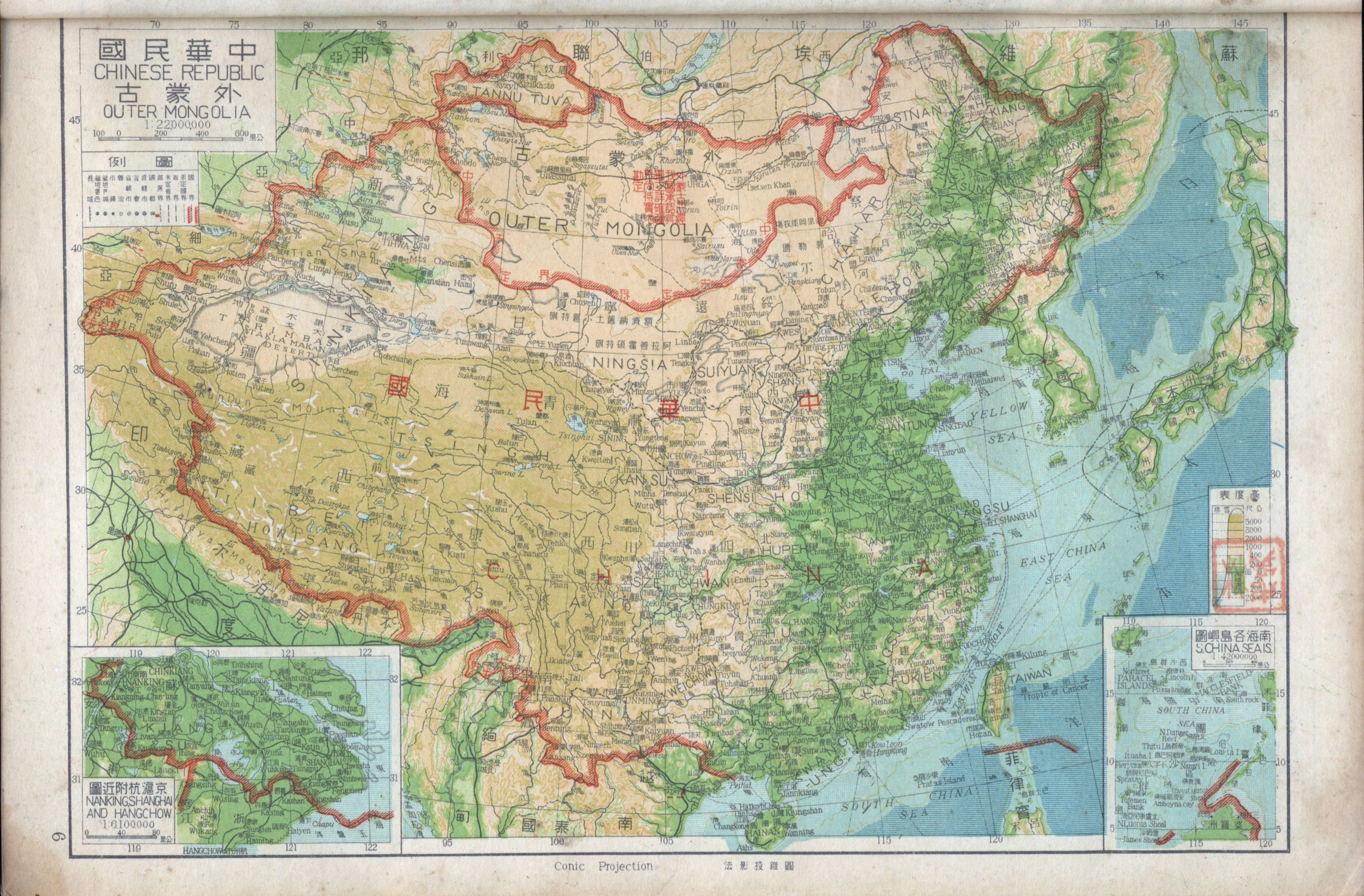
- A map of China with romanizations published in 1947
- Traditional Chinese: 郵政式拼音
- Simplified Chinese: 邮政式拼音
- Literal meaning: Postal-style romanization system
Transcriptions
Standard Mandarin
- Hanyu Pinyin: Yóuzhèng shì Pīnyīn
- Bopomofo: ㄧㄡˊ ㄓㄥˋ ㄕˋ ㄆㄧㄣ ㄧㄣ
- Wade–Giles: Yu^{2}-cheng^{4} shih^{4} P'in^{1}-yin^{1}
- Tongyong Pinyin: Yóu-jhèng shìh Pin-yin
- IPA: [jǒʊ.ʈʂə̂ŋ ʂɻ̩̂ pʰín.ín]
Yue: Cantonese
- Yale Romanization: Yàuhjing sīk Pingyām
- Jyutping: jau4 zing3 sik1 ping3 jam1
- IPA: [jɐw˩ tsɪŋ˧ sɪk̚˥ pʰɪŋ˧ jɐm˥]
Southern Min
- Hokkien POJ: Iû-chèng sek Phèng-im

Postal romanization was a system of transliterating place names in China developed by postal authorities in the late 19th and early 20th centuries. For many cities, the corresponding postal romanization was the most common English-language form of the city's name from the 1890s until the 1980s, when postal romanization was replaced by pinyin, but the system remained in place in Taiwan until 2002.

In 1892, Herbert Giles created a romanization system called the Nanking syllabary. The Imperial Maritime Customs Post Office would cancel postage with a stamp that gave the city of origin in Latin letters, often romanized using Giles's system. In 1896, the Customs Post was combined with other postal services and renamed the Chinese Imperial Post. As a national agency, the Imperial Post was an authority on Chinese place names.

When the Wade–Giles system became widespread, some argued that the post office should adopt it. This idea was rejected at a conference held in 1906 in Shanghai. Instead, the conference formally adopted Nanking syllabary. This decision allowed the post office to continue to use various romanizations that it had already selected. Wade–Giles romanization is based on the Beijing dialect, a pronunciation standard since the 1850s. The use of Nanking syllabary did not suggest that the post office considered the city's dialect standard; rather, it was a compromise attempt to accommodate a variety of Mandarin pronunciations with a single romanization system.

== Comparison table ==
Chinese (Trad. / Simp.)	D'Anville (1790)	Postal			Wade–Giles	Pinyin
Chinese (Trad. / Simp.)	D'Anville (1790)	1907 (Note: Richard, Louis, Kennelly, M, L. Richard's Comprehensive geography of the Chinese empire and dependencies Shanghai: Tusewei press, 1908, pp. 590 and ff. Cites the Government Red Book of April 1907.)	1919	1947 (Note: 1947 Chinese Republic, Outer Mongolia," 1947. p. 6. This map uses postal romanization, but with some uncommon forms of spelling.)	Wade–Giles	Pinyin
北京	Peking	Peking; Pehking	Peking	—N/a	Pei-ching	Běijīng
北平	—N/a	—N/a	—N/a	Peiping	Pei-pʻing	Běipíng
南京	Nan-king	Nanking			Nan-ching	Nánjīng
四川	Se-tchuen	Szechw'an	Szechwan		Ssu-ch’uan	Sìchuān
天津	Tien-king-oei; (天津衛; 天津卫)	T'ientsin	Tientsin		T’ien-chin	Tiānjīn
安徽	—N/a	Nganhwei	Anhwei		An-hui	Ānhuī
廈門; 厦门	Hia-men; Emoui	Hsiamên	Amoy		Hsia-mên	Xiàmén
廣東; 广东	Quang-tong	Kwangtung			Kuang-tung	Guǎngdōng
廣州; 广州	Quang-tcheou	Kwangchow			Kuang-chou	Guǎngzhōu
成都	Tching-tou-fou; (成都府)	Ch'êngtu	Chengtu		Ch’êng-tu	Chéngdū
杭州	Hang-tcheou	Hangchow			Hang-chou	Hángzhōu
桂林	Quei-li-ng-fou; (桂林府)	Kweilin			Kuei-lin	Guìlín
江南	Kiang-nan	—N/a	—N/a	—N/a	—N/a	—N/a
江蘇; 江苏	—N/a	Kiangsu			Chiang-su	Jiāngsū
濟南; 济南	Tci-nan-fou; (濟南府; 济南府)	Tsinan			Chi-nan	Jǐnán
蘇州; 苏州	Sou-tcheou-fou; (蘇州府; 苏州府)	Soochow; Suchow	Soochow		Su-chou	Sūzhōu
西安	Si-ngan-fou; (西安府)	Singan	Sianfu; Sian		Hsi-an	Xī'ān
重慶; 重庆	Tchong-kin-fou; (重慶府; 重庆府)	Ch'ungk'ing	Chungking		Ch’ung-ch’ing	Chóngqìng
青島; 青岛	—N/a	Ts'ingtao	Tsingtao		Ch’ing-tao	Qīngdǎo

The spelling "Amoy" is based on pronunciation of Xiamen in the neighboring Zhangzhou dialect of Hokkien 廈門; Ēe-mûi, which historically contributed to the formation of the local Amoy dialect of Hokkien in Xiamen. "Peking" is carried over from the d'Anville map which also came from older texts, such as Italian Jesuit Martino Martini's De Bello Tartarico Historia (1654) and Novus Atlas Sinensis (1655). In Nanking syllabary, the city is Pehking. The irregular oo in "Soochow" is to distinguish this city from Xuzhou in northern Jiangsu. The other postal romanizations are based on "Southern Mandarin", the historical court dialect based on the Nanjing dialect, which used to be the imperial lingua franca of the late Ming and early Qing court. Pinyin spellings are based on Standard Chinese, a form based on the Beijing dialect that is taught in the Chinese education system.

After the Kuomintang (KMT) party came to power in 1927, the capital was moved from Peking ('northern capital') to Nanking ('southern capital'). Peking was renamed to "Peiping" ('northern peace').

== History ==
The 1903 Postal Working Map – Harvard University Library

The Customs Post, China's first government-run post office, opened to the public and began issuing postage stamps in 1878. This office was part of the Imperial Maritime Customs Service, led by Irishman Robert Hart. By 1882, the Customs Post had offices in twelve Treaty Ports: Shanghai, Amoy, Chefoo, Chinkiang, Chungking, Foochow, Hankow, Ichang, Kewkiang, Nanking, Weihaiwei, and Wuhu. Local offices had postmarking equipment so mail was marked with a romanized form of the city's name. In addition, there were companies that provided local postal service in each of these cities.

A Chinese-English Dictionary by Herbert Giles, published in 1892, popularized the Wade–Giles method of transliteration. This system had been created by Thomas Francis Wade in 1867. It is based on pronunciation in Beijing. Giles's dictionary also gives pronunciation in the dialects of various other cities, allowing the reader to create locally based transliterations. From January 1893 to September 1896, local postal services issued postage stamps that featured the romanized name of the city they served using local pronunciation.

An imperial edict issued in 1896 designated the Customs Post a national postal service and renamed it the Chinese Imperial Post. The local post offices in the Treaty Ports were incorporated into the new service. The Customs Post was smaller than other postal services in China, such as the British. As the Imperial Post, it grew rapidly and soon became the dominant player in the market.

In 1899, Hart, as inspector general of posts, asked postmasters to submit romanizations for their districts. Although Hart asked for transliterations "according to the local pronunciation", most postmasters were reluctant to play lexicographer and simply looked up the relevant characters in a dictionary. The spellings that they submitted generally followed the Wade–Giles system, which was the standard method of transliteration at this time.

The post office published a draft romanization map in 1903. Disappointed with the Wade-based map, Hart issued another directive in 1905. This one told postmasters to submit romanizations "not as directed by Wade, but according to accepted or usual local spellings." Local missionaries could be consulted, Hart suggested. However, Wade's system did reflect pronunciation in Mandarin-speaking areas. (Note: This map shows where the various dialects of Chinese are spoken. Both Wade-Giles and pinyin are based on Northern Mandarin, which is shown in red.)

Théophile Piry, a long-time customs manager, was appointed postal secretary in 1901. Appointing a French national to the top position fulfilled an 1898 commitment by China to "take into account the recommendations of the French government" when selecting staff for the post office. Until 1911, the post office remained part of the Chinese Maritime Customs Service, which meant that Hart was Piry's boss.

=== 1906 conference ===
To resolve the romanization issue, Piry organized an Imperial Postal Joint-Session Conference (Note: 帝國郵電聯席會議; dìguó yóudiàn liánxí huìyì.) in Shanghai in the spring of 1906. This was a joint postal and telegraphic conference. The conference resolved that existing spellings would be retained for names already transliterated. Accents, apostrophes, and hyphens would be dropped to facilitate telegraphic transmission. The requirement for addresses to be given in Chinese characters was dropped. For new transliterations, local pronunciation would be followed in Guangdong as well as in parts of Guangxi and Fujian. In other areas, a system called Nanking syllabary would be used.

The Nanking syllabary was one of several transliteration systems presented by Giles to represent various local dialects. Nanjing had once been the capital and its dialect was, like that of Beijing, a pronunciation standard. But the decision to use Nanking syllabary was not intended to suggest that the post office recognized any specific dialect as standard. The Lower Yangtze Mandarin dialect spoken in Nanjing makes more phonetic distinctions than other dialects. A romanization system geared to this dialect can be used to reflect pronunciation in a wider variety of dialects.

Southern Mandarin is widely spoken in both Jiangsu and Anhui. In Giles' idealization, the speaker consistently makes various phonetic distinctions not made in Beijing dialect (or in the dialect of any other specific city). Giles created the system to encompass a range of dialects. For the French-led post office, an additional advantage of the system was that it allowed "the romanization of non-English speaking people to be met as far as possible," as Piry put it. That is to say, Piry considered the Wade–Giles system to be specific to English.

Atlases explaining postal romanization were issued in 1907, 1919, 1933, and 1936. The ambiguous result of the 1906 conference led critics to complain that postal romanization was idiosyncratic. According to modern scholar Lane J. Harris:

What they have criticized is actually the very strength of postal romanization. That is, postal romanization accommodated local dialects and regional pronunciations by recognizing local identity and language as vital to a true representation of the varieties of Chinese orthoepy as evinced by the Post Office's repeated desire to transcribe according to "local pronunciation" or "provincial sound-equivalents".

=== Later developments ===
At the Commission on the Unification of Pronunciation in 1913, the idea of a national language with a standardized trans-regional phonology was approved. A period of turmoil followed as President Yuan Shikai reversed course and attempted to restore the teaching of Literary Chinese. Yuan died in 1916 and the Ministry of Education published a pronunciation standard now known as Old National Pronunciation for Guoyu in 1918. The post office reverted to Wade's system in 1920 and 1921. It was the era of the May Fourth Movement, when language reform was the rage. The post office adopted a dictionary by William Edward Soothill as a reference. The Soothill-Wade system was used for newly created offices. Existing post offices retained their romanizations.

Critics described the Ministry's standard, now called Old National Pronunciation, as a mishmash of dialects, bookish, and reminiscent of previous dynasties. While drawing phonetic features from Beijing dialect, many phonological features of Southern Mandarin had been retained. In December 1921, Henri Picard-Destelan, co-director of the Post Office, quietly ordered a return to Nanking syllabary "until such time as uniformity is possible." Although the Soothill-Wade period was brief, it was a time when 13,000 offices were created, a rapid and unprecedented expansion. At the time the policy was reversed, one third of all postal establishments used Soothill-Wade spelling. The Ministry published a revised pronunciation standard based strictly on Jilu Mandarin in 1932. (Note: Vocabulary of National Pronunciation for Everyday Use, pinyin: Guóyīn Chángyòng Zìhuì (国音常用字汇 / 國音常用字彙))

In 1943, the Japanese ousted A. M. Chapelain, the last French head of the Chinese post. The post office had been under French administration almost continuously since Piry's appointment as postal secretary in 1901. (Note: The only break in French control of the post office was 1928 to 1931, when Norwegian Erik Tollefsen was foreign head.)

In 1958, the People's Republic of China announced that it was adopting the pinyin romanization system. Implementing the new system was a gradual process. The government did not get around to abolishing postal romanization until 1964. Even then, the post office did not adopt pinyin, but merely withdrew Latin characters from official use, such as in postal cancellation markings.

Mapmakers of the time followed various approaches. Private atlas makers generally used postal romanization before ultimately shifting to Wade–Giles. The U.S. Central Intelligence Agency used a mix of postal romanization and Wade–Giles. The U.S. Army Map Service used Wade–Giles exclusively.

The U.S. government and the American press adopted pinyin in 1979. The International Organization for Standardization followed suit in 1982.

Postal romanization remained official in Taiwan until 2002, when Tongyong Pinyin was adopted. In 2009, Hanyu Pinyin replaced Tongyong Pinyin as the official romanization (see Chinese language romanization in Taiwan). While street names in Taipei have been romanized via Hanyu Pinyin, municipalities throughout Taiwan, such as Kaohsiung and Tainan, presently use a number of romanizations, including Tongyong Pinyin and postal romanization.

== See also ==
- EFEO Chinese transcription
- Postage stamps and postal history of China
