= History of the Chinese language =

Early example of Chinese writing, the Oracle bone script

The Chinese language is a Sino-Tibetan language which originated in the vicinity of the Yellow River Valley. The earliest historical linguistic evidence of the spoken Chinese language dates back approximately 3,500 years, while examples of the writing system that would become written Chinese are attested in inscriptions made on bronze vessels and oracle bones during the Late Shang period (c. 1250 – 1050 BCE), with the very oldest dated to c. 1250 BCE. In the first millennium BCE and first millennium CE, the language spread beyond the Yellow River basin, primarily into what is now Southern China, gradually replacing the indigenous languages of the region.

With the end of the Han dynasty (202 BCE - 220 CE), Old Chinese developed into Middle Chinese. Successive waves of migration brought overlapping layers of linguistic influence to the south, while northern speech continued to change over the centuries, diverging into today's Chinese varieties. One major development in Northern China was the emergence of Old Mandarin in the 11th or 12th century, which contained a number of distinctive innovations setting it apart from older forms of Chinese. This new form of northern speech spread rapidly throughout northern China and subsequently encroached into parts of southern China as well, internally diverging in the process. Various southern Chinese varieties later spread to other parts of the world with the Chinese diaspora, while northern varieties simultaneously spread to the peripheries of China's northern territories in the Zou Xikou and Chuang Guandong migratory movements.

Although the varieties of Chinese lie within a dialect continuum, the Chinese language historically relied on standard speech forms such as yayan to bridge the low or non-existing mutual intelligibility between more distant forms. The term "Mandarin" first emerged to describe the Nanjing-based lingua franca of officials in Late Imperial China. In the mid-19th century, the standard form of Mandarin shifted from the earlier Nanjing-based Mandarin to a different form of Mandarin local to Beijing. This Beijing-based speech subsequently became known in the 20th century as Modern Standard Chinese.

Until recent times, Written Chinese was dominated by Classical, or Literary Chinese, a system of syntax and vocabulary based on the written language of ancient Chinese Classics before 221 BCE. Classical Chinese served as the language of formal writing and a lingua franca across East Asia until the end of the 19th century. However, in the Ming dynasty (1368-1644), Chinese writers started using baihua (Written vernacular Chinese) to write fiction, such as the Classic Chinese novels. Nevertheless, it was only in the early 20th century New Culture Movement that baihua displaced the dominance of Classical Chinese. At the same time, there were growing reformist calls to simplify Chinese characters, with the Chinese Nationalist government first attempting to simplify them in 1935, followed by a more extensive effort by the communist People's Republic of China in 1956.

== Proto-Sino-Tibetan and Proto-Sinitic (before 1300 BCE) ==
A hypothetical scenario for the homeland and spread of Proto-Sino-Tibetan speakers, based on a 2019 database of comparative archaeological data developed by Laurent Sagart et al.

The oldest attested written Chinese—comprising the oracle bone inscriptions made during the 13th century BCE by the Shang dynasty royal house in modern Anyang, Henan—is also the earliest direct evidence of the Sinitic languages. Most experts agree that Sinitic languages share a common ancestor with the Tibeto-Burman languages, forming the primary Sino-Tibetan family. However, the precise placement of Sinitic within Sino-Tibetan is a matter of debate. Reconstructing the common ancestor of all Sino-Tibetan languages, known as Proto-Sino-Tibetan—a language last spoken thousands of years before the historical record—has been challenging. Even though Chinese characters are logographs that do not encode the sounds of speech directly, written Chinese allows for the partial reconstruction of how ancient forms of the language sounded. No such evidence exists for earlier stages, including where Sinitic would have split from other branches of Sino-Tibetan. There are several reasons that the comparative method conventionally used in historical linguistics has had limited success in reconstructing the history of Sino-Tibetan compared to the results achieved with other major language families like Indo-European:

1. Relatively few Sino-Tibetan languages, of which Chinese is one, have written traditions old enough to provide useful comparative evidence.
2. In areas where Sino-Tibetan languages are spoken, there have historically been high rates of population transfer. This has resulted in many areal features shared between languages, making it difficult to determine which relationships—not only cognates in vocabulary, but also grammatical features—are phylogenetic.
3. Languages that make heavier use of morphology generally provide more data useful in historical comparisons, i.e. the conjugated and derived forms of words. Compared to Indo-European languages like Latin, Greek, and Sanskrit, Sino-Tibetan languages are highly isolating and exhibit very little morphology, making it difficult to identify cognates.

Linguists Alexander Vovin and George van Driem suggest that a number of proposed cognates between Austronesian and Sinitic languages indicate there was an Austronesian substratum in Sinitic, which may date back as far as the third or fourth millennia BCE in the Longshan interaction sphere.

== Pre-Classical period (1300–500 BCE) ==
Chinese inscription on bronze wine vessel in the shape of a horse, Western Zhou dynasty

Old Chinese, sometimes known as "Archaic Chinese", is ancestral to all current Chinese languages. The first known use of the Chinese writing system is divinatory inscriptions into tortoise shells and oracle bones during the Shang dynasty (1766–1122 BCE). During the first half of the Zhou dynasty (1122–256 BCE), writing descended from the Shang is found in texts including inscriptions on bronze artefacts, the Classic of Poetry and the history of the Book of Documents. Phonetic elements found in the majority of Chinese characters also provide hints to their Old Chinese pronunciations, as do the pronunciations of borrowed Chinese characters in Japanese, Korean, and Vietnamese. Old Chinese was not wholly uninflected. It possessed a rich sound system in which aspiration or rough breathing differentiated the consonants, but was probably still without tones. Work on reconstructing Old Chinese started with Qing dynasty philologists.

== Classical period (500 BCE – 1 CE) ==
Words in Old Chinese were generally monosyllabic; as such, each character denoted an independent word. Affixes could be added to form a new word, which was often written with the same single character. In many cases, the pronunciations then diverged due to the systematic sound changes caused by the affixes. For example, many modern readings reflect the departing tone present in Middle Chinese, which many scholars now believe is a reflex of a derivational suffix /*-s/ that served a range of semantic functions in Old Chinese. This is possibly the only example of inflectional morphology extant in what was otherwise an analytic language:

Evolution of character senses as caused by the Old Chinese 去聲 (qùshēng)
Character	OC (Note: According to Baxter's 1992 reconstruction of Old Chinese)		MC (Note: Using Baxter's transcription for Middle Chinese)		mod.	Gloss
傳	*drjon	→	drjwen'	→	chuán	'to transmit'
傳	*drjons	→	drjwen^{H}	→	zhuàn	'a record'
磨	*maj	→	ma	→	mó	'to grind'
磨	*majs	→	ma^{H}	→	mò	'grindstone'
宿	*sjuk	→	sjuwk	→	sù	'to stay overnight'
宿	*sjuks	→	sjuw^{H}	→	xiù	'celestial mansion'
説	*hljot	→	sywet	→	shuō	'speak'
説	*hljots	→	sywej^{H}	→	shuì	'exhort'

Another common sound change occurred between voiced and voiceless initials, though the phonemic voicing distinction has disappeared in most modern varieties. This is believed to reflect an Old Chinese de-transitivising prefix, but scholars disagree on whether the voiced or voiceless form reflects the original root. Each pair of examples below reflects two words of opposite transitivity.

Evolution of character transitivity pairs from Old Chinese
Character	OC		MC		mod.	Gloss
見	*kens	→	ken^{H}	→	jiàn	'to see'
見	*gens	→	hen^{H}	→	xiàn	'to appear'
敗	*prats	→	pæj^{H}	→	bài (Note: In this case, the pronunciations have converged in Standard Chinese, but they have not in other varieties.)	'to defeat'
敗	*brats	→	bæj^{H}	→	bài	'to be defeated'
折	*tjat	→	tsyet	→	zhé	'to bend'
折	*djat	→	dzyet	→	shé	'to be broken by bending'

=== Dialectal variation ===
A divergent dialect split from Old Chinese in this period: Ba–Shu Chinese was first described during the Western Han dynasty and represented one of the earliest splits from Old Chinese. Another dialectal divergence can be found in the Classic of Poetry, such as rhyme mergers which could not be found in Middle Chinese. The common language (yayan 雅言) of the late Spring and Autumn and Warring States Period, mainly used by the Six States east of Qin, was likely based on the dialect of the Jin state, while the common language (tongyu 通語 or fanyu 凡語) of the Han dynasty was based on a combination of the dialects of the Jin and Qin states. Other dialects in this period included Yan (Hebei), Qi/Lu (Shandong), Chu (Middle Yangtze), Wu (Lower Yangtze) and Yue.

Clerical script

=== Writing ===
During the Warring States and Qin periods, large numbers of phono-semantic compound characters were created and replaced older characters, sometimes entering newer copies of older texts. The Qin state generally retained a more conservative style of written characters similar to Western Zhou writing, less affected by the popular writing styles that emerged in the six states of the east. At the end of this period, when the Qin defeated the other six states, they suppressed the other forms of writing and imposed a unified, simplified, but still somewhat pictographic style known as Small Seal script, which allowed Chinese writing to become a common unifying medium for speakers of different Chinese varieties. A larger innovation that took place in the Qin and Han dynasties was the development of Clerical Script (隸書), the largest transformation of Chinese character structure in history. The development of Clerical Script is considered to be the turning point that divides ancient from modern Chinese script, as it dropped the pictographic appearance of earlier Chinese characters to speed up writing. The new structures opted for fewer strokes, straight rather than curved strokes, on top of simplifying or merging components of many characters. The Clerical Script character structure has largely continued to the modern period, albeit with a further stylistic smoothening and straightening of curved strokes known as "regularization".

== Eastern Han period (1–300 CE) ==
Eastern Han Chinese is the period which is considered to be intermediate between Old and Middle Chinese. The consonant clusters postulated for Old Chinese had generally disappeared by the Eastern Han period.

=== Vocabulary and written language ===
The customary writing style of the period was strongly modelled on the classics, and thus provides only occasional glimpses of contemporary grammar. Some works contain passages in a more colloquial style thought to reflect contemporary speech. Many such examples are found in translated Buddhist literature, particularly direct speech, or paraphrases and commentaries of the classics written for the benefit of novice students. In comparison with Warring States texts, colloquial Eastern Han texts display a massive increase in compound content words. Monosyllabic words were largely replaced by disyllabic compounds.

Old Chinese had a range of personal pronouns, including case distinctions. In the Eastern Han, these were reduced to first person wǒ 我 and second person rǔ 汝. The demonstrative shì 是 also came to be used as a copular verb in sentences of the form A 是 B (as in modern Chinese), replacing the typical classical pattern A B 也 (yě). They also make much less use of function words in favour of periphrasis.

=== Dialectal divergence ===
Modern Min Chinese dialects of Fujian are believed to have descended from southeastern dialects of Eastern Han Chinese which split off during this period. Proto-Min may have been a daughter language to an early form of Sinitic in the Lower Yangtze region known as Ancient Wu, though this is not fully accepted. According to the 2nd century commentator Zheng Xuan, the Qi (齊) or Shandong dialect retained some Old Chinese features such as the rime *-ai, which is similar to today's Min. The first wave of migrants into the Min-speaking region came from Shandong during the Qin and Han dynasties.

Pointing to features of Min varieties that are also found in Hakka and Yue varieties, Jerry Norman suggests that all three groups are, to varying degrees, derived from a variety spoken in the lower Yangtze region during the Han period, which he calls Old Southern Chinese. He argues that this dialect belonged to the group of dialects known as Wu or Jiangdong (江東) in the Western Jin period, when the writer Guo Pu (early 4th century AD) described them as quite distinct from other Chinese varieties.

== Middle Chinese (300–1200) ==
Middle Chinese was a form of Chinese used during the Sui, Tang, and Song dynasties between the 4th and 10th centuries. It can be divided into two periods: Early Middle Chinese is documented in the Qieyun (601), the first rime dictionary, and a later revision in the Guangyun (1008). Late Middle Chinese is reflected by 12th century rime tables such as the Yunjing. The evidence for the pronunciation of Middle Chinese comes from several sources: modern dialect variations, rime dictionaries, foreign transliterations, rime tables constructed by ancient Chinese philologists to summarize the phonetic system, and Chinese phonetic translations of foreign words.

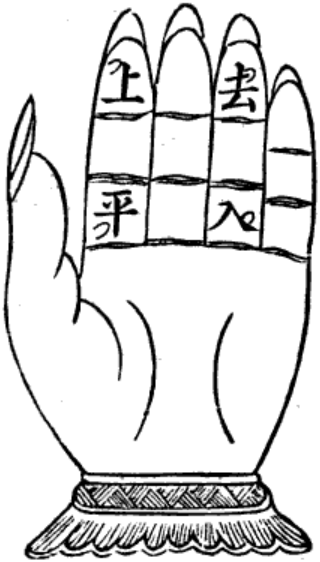
Illustration explaining tone markings for the four tones of Middle Chinese

The phonology of Middle Chinese changed considerably from Old Chinese. For instance, the medial "r" disappeared, which caused the retroflexion of coronal consonants (e.g. /tr-/ > /ʈ-/), and the same consonants with the medial /j/ underwent palatalization (e.g. /tj-/ > /tɕ-/), producing a larger inventory of initials. A series of voiceless sonorants /m̥/, /n̥/, /ŋ̊/, /ŋ̊ʷ/, /l̥/, and possibly /r̥/ disappeared when they underwent fortition in Middle Chinese. Old Chinese /*r/ developed into /l/.

Middle Chinese tones developed from Old Chinese syllables with final consonants which disappeared, with "departing" tone developing from syllables that formerly ended with /s/, "rising" tone developing from syllables that formerly ended in /ʔ/, the "entering" tone referring to syllables which retained a final stop consonant, and "level" tone from all other syllables. As these suffixes were part of the derivational morphology of Old Chinese, tonal variation often appeared either in a single word or in semantically related words.

=== Branching into varieties ===
By Tang times, many, if not most, of the traits associated with the written vernacular of later periods in history were already evident, and this written language form can be identified with northern varieties, close to the Old Mandarin of later times. The vernacular language was completely distinct from the formal Literary Chinese, which was still based on Old Chinese classics and was still fundamental to higher education.

The Tang dynasty form of Middle Chinese was highly influential, forming much of the reading pronunciations in Korea, Japan, and Vietnam, and displacing pre-Tang regional varieties across all of its territories except for individual words and colloquial Min Chinese. However, Norman and Coblin (1995) questioned the assumption that all non-Min Chinese varieties descended from Middle Chinese as indicated in the rime dictionaries, demonstrating that spoken language in the Middle Chinese period was much more diverse and less phonologically conservative than the rime dictionaries indicate. They questioned whether the non-Min varieties had split off only during the period of Middle Chinese (7th century or later).

Local Chinese dialects shaded according to their divergence from northern Chinese linguistic features. Southern dialect families formed from successive waves of migration from the north.

The following families can largely be traced back to splits in the Middle Chinese period:

- Wu Chinese can be traced back to Eastern Jin dynasty Jiangnan, when commonfolk typically spoke the earlier local form of Sinitic, Ancient Wu, or their native Shandong or northern Jiangsu Chinese, while the aristocracy typically spoke a variety not dissimilar to that of early medieval Luoyang. This linguistic overlap eventually led to the formation of modern Wu, with many early coincidental strata that are hard to differentiate today. Shandong and northern Jiangsu dialects likely played an important role in the formation of Wu Chinese, as more than half of the migrants came from this region. After the An Lushan rebellion, northern migrants settled in Wu areas, developing into northern Wu.
- According to Norman, Yue also contains vestiges of "Old Southern Chinese", but less than Hakka. Yue formed largely from a layer of 10th century Middle Chinese overlapping pre-existing Sinitic and indigenous languages, followed by another layer of northern influence in the early Mandarin period.
- Norman argues that today's Hakka resulted from overlays of "Old Southern Chinese" (Ancient Wu) by successive waves of influence from northern China. The principal source of Hakka is a thick Late Middle Chinese layer brought by Tang dynasty northern migrants mixed with Northern Gan, combined with the archaic layer shared with Min and Yue.
- Northern Gan Chinese formed when migrants in the period between the Han and Tang dynasties mixed with earlier inhabitants, causing their speech to diverge from the Tang capital more than Southern Gan. According to Sagart, Southern Gan had a common origin with Hakka: a Tang dynasty Late Middle Chinese layer mixed with Northern Gan and the same archaic layer as Hakka (although less prominent due to its greater exposure to northern influence). On top of the Tang-era influences, Gan absorbed continued northern influences due to southward flows of refugees in the Southern Song.
- Xiang Chinese emerged on the basis of the Old Chu language which had split off before the Tang dynasty, but northern Xiang came under strong northern influence due to refugee settlement during the An Lushan Rebellion. Conversely, southern Xiang retains more archaic features. Xiang also contains archaic traits linked to the Six Dynasties Jiangdong dialect (Ancient Wu). Nevertheless, Xiang as a whole would come under strong northern influence from Mandarinization in subsequent time periods.
- The most significant event in the emergence of Pinghua dialects was the 11th century Nong Zhigao rebellion, when the Song dynasty deployed northern armies, mostly from Shandong, to Guangxi. These troops absorbed the small Sinitic communities that had lived in the region before then, forming the Pinghua linguistic community.
- Colloquial layers of Jin Chinese bear close resemblance to Shazhou/Hexi Corridor dialects from the mid-Tang to the 11th century (possibly extending to include 12th century Tangut transcriptions of a variant of Chinese), suggesting that all of these varieties diverged from an earlier northwestern dialect. However, it is not clear how the mid-Tang Shazhou dialects emerged, or if it had any relation with the earlier dialects of the Corridor.

== Old Mandarin (1100–1400) ==
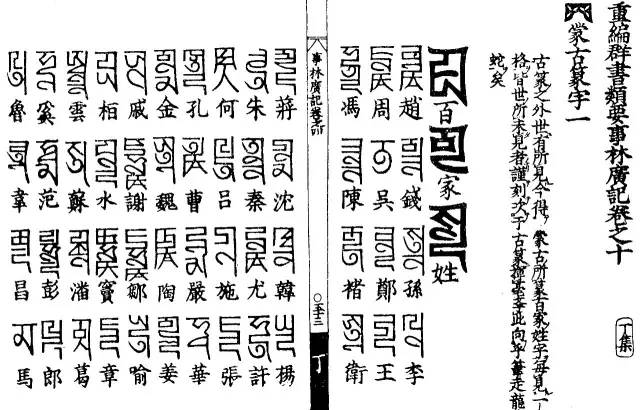
The Tibetan-derived 'Phags-pa alphabet, promulgated under the Yuan dynasty, used to transcribe Old Mandarin

After the Middle Chinese period, non-Han rule in Northern China weakened the conservative tradition of the Qieyun. Local speech patterns in the North developed a new form of spoken language which scholars now refer to as Old Mandarin.

Shao Yong's adaptation of the rime tables, without reference to the Qieyun tradition, to describe the phonology of either 11th-century Kaifeng, or his hometown Fanyang, show that the speech of this time already displayed some of the phonological characteristics of Northern Mandarin, such as the diphthongization of vowels in syllables with -k finals. Zhou Zumo (1966) concluded from Shao Yong's tables that his voiced stops and affricates had also devoiced and aspirated in level tone and devoiced without aspiration in other tones, a change which was not visible in contemporary Western Xia records. Similar records of Chinese proper nouns in the Khitan small script also show that diphthongization had occurred, as well as other Mandarin sound changes such as the loss of stop consonant finals, and devoicing according to the aforementioned tonal rules. Zhongyuan Yinyun, created by Zhōu Déqīng (周德清) in 1324, show the even tone (平 píng) divided in upper and lower tones called 陰平 yīnpíng and 陽平 yángpíng, respectively. Apical vowels emerged as a new rime class. The entering tone disappeared, and syllables in the entering tone are distributed between the other tones, but placed after the other syllables with labels such as 入聲作去聲 (rùshēng zuò qùshēng, 'entering tone makes departing tone').

=== Written language ===
In the Song, Jin and Yuan periods, a new form of vernacular literature emerged from popular use, divorced from traditional archaisms. Examples of this vernacular literature include the sanqu verse form, rhymed according to contemporary speech rather than ancient pronunciations. Apart from this northern written vernacular, no comparable written vernacular based on a non-standard Chinese variety ever emerged; modern vernacular writing remains a direct continuation of this form of vernacular.

=== Developing into modern varieties ===
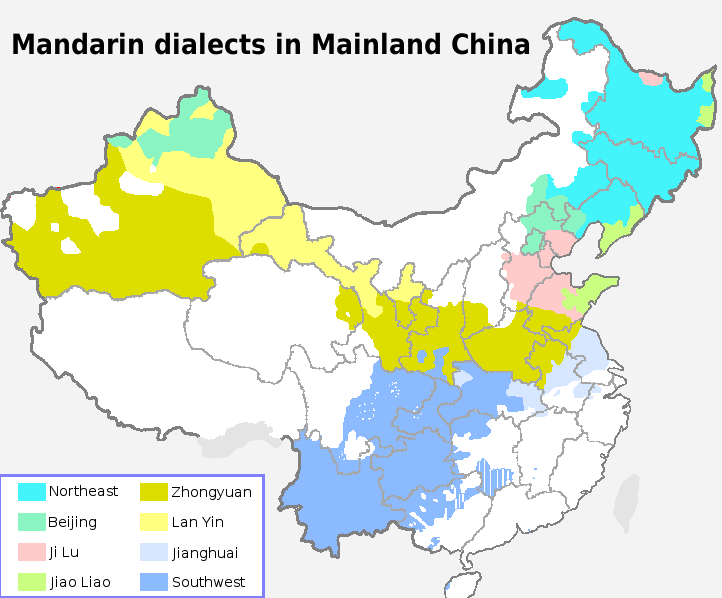
Mandarin dialect map

The development of Chinese has been complex. The prevalence of Mandarin throughout northern China is due in part to the open plains of northern China, in contrast to the mountains and rivers of southern China that obstructed travel and preserved greater linguistic diversity. In northern China, Mandarin dialects maintained more homogeneity due to internal migration patterns. Populations in regions such as the Guanzhong region would rapidly disperse in times of hardship, only to recover through new immigration after a short interval.

During the Jin–Song Wars, refugees from Northern China repopulated the devasted regions around the Huai and Lower Yangtze areas, and brought a variety which became Jianghuai Mandarin. Some Chinese linguists such as Ting believe that Jianghuai was formed from a substrate of Wu while containing a superstratum of Mandarin. According to the form of Old Mandarin recorded in the Zhongyuan Yinyun, checked tone syllables were redistributed into qu if they had sonorant initials, and shang if they had voiceless initials (like Jiaoliao Mandarin, and most syllables in Northeast Mandarin). The Ming era text Qi Xiu Leigao suggests that the Kaifeng dialect of the Northern Song redistributed the entering tone in these ways as well, but according to the Ming text Jiaotai Lun, the Ming era local dialect instead redistributed sonorant-initial consonants into yinping (like modern Central Plains Mandarin). Hence, between the Northern Song and the Ming, several sound changes occurred.

A 12th/13th century wave of Early Mandarin-speaking northern refugees passing through Jiangxi into Guangdong also mixed with older Yue dialects. Hence, eastern Yue (or "New Yue") dialects such as Cantonese generally contain commonalities with Mandarin (such as aspiration of some former voiced stops) which are absent in western Yue ("Old Yue") dialects such as Goulou Yue.

== Middle Mandarin (1400–1850) ==
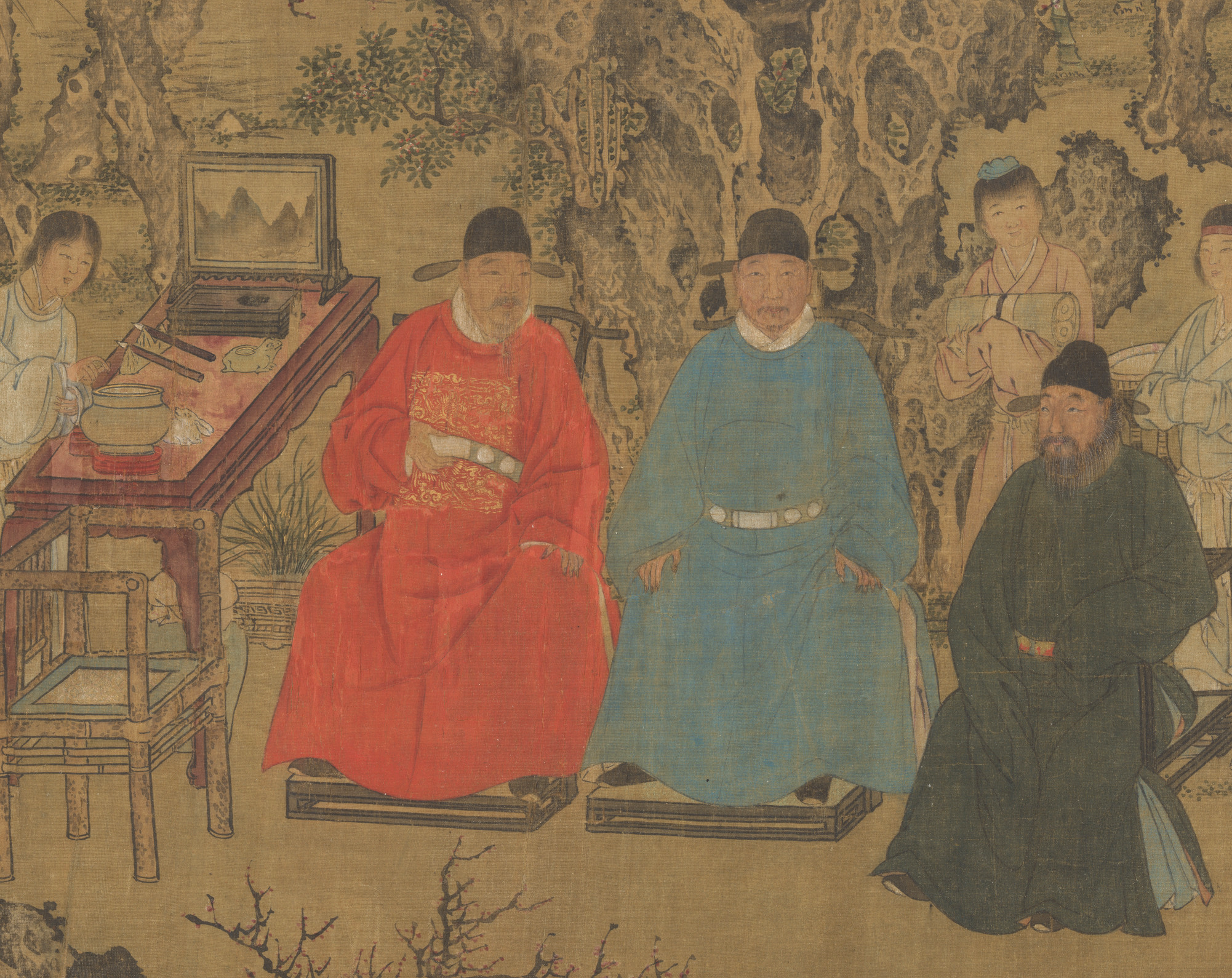
Painting of a gathering of Ming dynasty officials

Mandarin, called Guanhua ('officials' speech') was at first based on the Nanjing dialect from the beginning of the Ming dynasty, and became the dominant vernacular in northern China during the early Qing. It was gradually challenged by the variety used by scholar-officials of Beijing. In the 17th century, the Qing began setting up orthoepy academies to conform pronunciation to the Beijing standard, but had little success.

Based on the differences between the accounts of Korean scholar Sin Sukchu and the Jesuit missionaries of the early Ming to the late Ming respectively, Mandarin during this period saw the loss of the voiced initials and the merger of [-m] finals with [-n], the initials [ʋ-] and [r-] had become voiced fricatives [v-] and [ʐ-] respectively, [ʔ-] had merged into [ŋ-] before mid and low vowels, and both initials had disappeared before high vowels. By the early 18th century, the mid-vowel [e]/[ɔ] had merged with [a].

=== Vocabulary and written language ===
Most of the vocabulary found in descriptions of Mandarin speech before the mid-19th century has been retained by modern Standard Chinese. However, several words that appear in the more broadly-based written vernacular of the Qing and earlier periods are absent from early accounts of standard Mandarin speech. These include such now-common words as hē 喝 'to drink', hěn 很 'very', suǒyǒude 所有的 'all, whatsoever' and zánmen 咱們 'we (inclusive)'. During the Ming and Qing, vernacular language (baihua) began to be used in novels, but most formal writing remained in Literary Chinese.

=== Formation of modern varieties ===
Ming dynasty provinces

Modern Southwestern Mandarin was formed by the waves of immigrants brought to the regions during the Ming and Qing Dynasties. The dialects of Chengdu-Chongqing and Hubei are believed to retain traits of Ming-era Mandarin. Ba–Shu Chinese started to disappear during the late Southern Song dynasty period due to the Mongol conquest of China, which resulted in a massacre throughout the Sichuan Basin. The language was supplanted by Southwestern Mandarin after settlement by people from other parts of China, mostly from present-day Hubei and Hunan. Phonological aspects of Ba–Shu Chinese are preserved in the Minjiang dialect of Sichuanese Mandarin, which caused debate on whether the dialect is a variant of Southwestern Mandarin or a modern-day descendant of Ba–Shu.

Due to the influx of Southwestern Mandarin into northeast Guangxi, the Northern Pinghua dialects there became highly Mandarinized, while Southern Pinghua remained in a dialectal continuum with Yue Chinese. Many Xiang dialects (New Xiang) also converged phonologically with Southwestern Mandarin.

== Modern Chinese (1850–present) ==
Qing dynasty officials disseminated the Beijing standard

During the mid-19th century, the Beijing dialect finally replaced the Nanjing dialect as the lingua franca among the court officials, and its use was observed in some non-Mandarin-speaking cities such as Canton. However, non-Mandarin-speaking areas in southern China continued to use their local varieties in most aspects of life, as Beijing Mandarin was not considered prestigious. The Chinese diasporic communities during this period spoke southern Chinese varieties such as Cantonese or Hokkien, and most Chinese associations, schools, and media were originally organised around the spoken language varieties.

After the establishment of the Republic of China, the 1913 Commission on the Unification of Pronunciation planned to promulgate a new standard national dialect, redubbing it as Guoyu ('national language'). The Commission made an attempt to create a compromise between dialects: a synthetic pronunciation based on Beijing but adding back the entering tone and other consonantal finals from southern varieties, as well as Wu consonantal initials. However, this attempt at synthesis was abandoned by the late 1920s/early 1930s in favor of Beijing Mandarin.

The language situation changed with the creation of an elementary school education system committed to teaching Standard Chinese in both mainland China and Taiwan. At the time that it was being widely introduced in these places, the British colony of Hong Kong began to teach it, but abandoned that initiative in the late 1950s to 1960s. In Hong Kong and Macau, Cantonese remains the everyday language in education and business, and in parts of Guangdong and Guangxi, Cantonese remains the everyday language used in business. Standard Chinese also spread to schools throughout the Chinese diaspora.

=== Vocabulary and written language ===
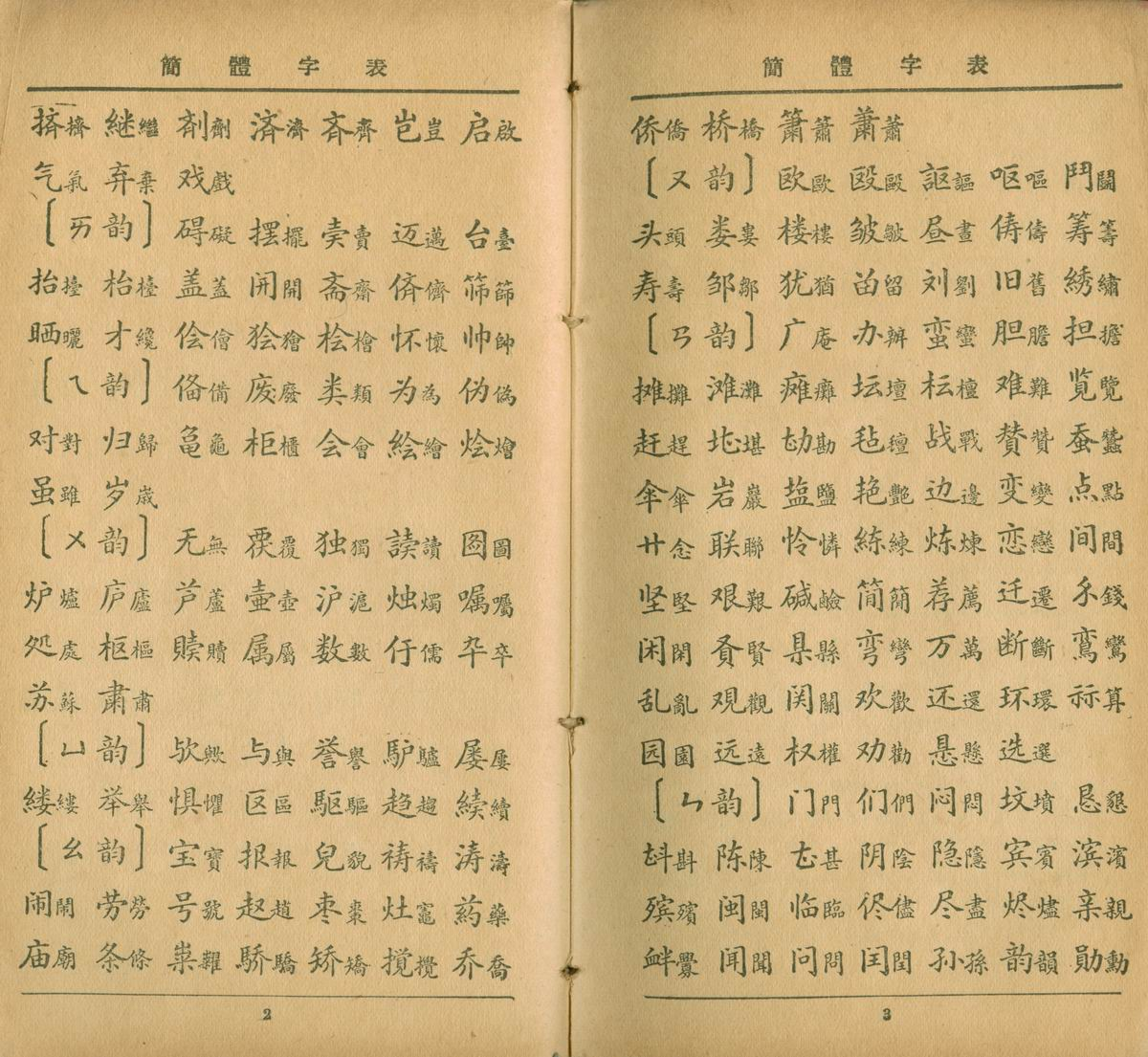
An excerpt of the 1935 Chinese Nationalist government simplified character scheme

The modern Chinese language has adopted a wide array of foreign loanwords, which have often been adapted to Chinese pronunciation, referred to as the phono-semantic matching. The Chinese language also borrowed numerous technical terms that were invented in Japan but constructed using Chinese character morphemes.

At the end of the 19th century, East Asian countries which had traditionally used Classical Chinese for formal writing began to shift to local vernaculars, due to rising nationalism. From 1919, reformers in China aggressively promoted a new written baihua vernacular writing based on Beijing Mandarin to completely replace Literary Chinese.

By the late 19th century, Chinese scholars proposed several schemes to write Chinese using alphabetic script. These alphabetic proposals were influenced by Christian missionaries who designed various Romanization schemes for multiple varieties of Chinese as part of their education-based evangelizing strategy. The Chinese Nationalist government also attempted to implement character simplification in 1935, but the project failed due to strong opposition.

Continuing previous policies, the People's Republic of China sought to further standardize a common language, now dubbed Standard Chinese, for national and political unity. The "Decision of the Chinese Communist Party Central Committee and State Council Concerning Elimination of Illiteracy" of March 1956 solidified the Communist Party's plans to reform the country's traditional characters to a simplified writing system to improve literacy.

In the 1945, the United Nations Charter provided (in Article 111) that English, Spanish, French, Russian, Chinese were the official and equally authoritative languages of the UN. Besides the standard writing systems promoted by the government, no other written form of Chinese has seen widespread use to an extent comparable to that of Standard Chinese.

== See also ==
- Historical Chinese phonology
