= Old National Pronunciation =

1913-1926 Republic of China attempt to unify the Chinese dialects

- 老國音
- Language family: Sino-Tibetan: Sinitic; Chinese; Mandarin; Beijing Mandarin; Old National Pronunciation
- Early forms: Proto-Sino-Tibetan: Old Chinese; Eastern Han Chinese; Middle Chinese; Old Mandarin; Middle Mandarin
- Writing system: Traditional Chinese characters; Bopomofo

Language codes
- ISO 639-3: None (mis)

The Old National Pronunciation (traditional Chinese: 老國音; simplified Chinese: 老国音; pinyin: Lǎo guóyīn; Wade–Giles: Lao^{3} kuo^{2}-yin^{1}) was the system established for the phonology of standard Chinese as decided by the Commission on the Unification of Pronunciation from 1913 onwards, and published in the 1919 edition of the Guoyin Zidian (國音字典, "National Pronunciation Dictionary"). A revised edition was published in February 1921. Although it was mainly based on the phonology of the Beijing dialect, it was also influenced by historical forms of northern Mandarin as well as other varieties of Mandarin and even some varieties of Wu Chinese.

The artificial nature of the system proved impractical, and in 1926 a decision was made to normalize the pronunciations to the pronunciations found in Beijing, which resulted in a revised Guóyīn Chángyòng Zìhuì (國音常用字匯, "Vocabulary of National Pronunciation for Everyday Use") published in 1932.

== Phonology ==
The Old National Pronunciation was similar to the phonology of the Beijing dialect, but with four additional distinctions derived from Middle Chinese that were still maintained in other dialects:

1. Three more initials, derived from the initials of Middle Chinese: 微 /v/, 疑 as two initials, /ŋ/ and /ɲ/.
2. Preservation of the "round-sharp distinction" (traditional Chinese: 尖團音; simplified Chinese: 尖团音; pinyin: jiān-tuán yīn). The alveolo-palatal initials of the Beijing dialect (/tɕ, tɕʰ, ɕ/), written in pinyin as j, q and x, originated in a merger between velar initials (/k, kʰ, x/) and alveolar affricates (/ts, tsʰ, s/) before the front vowels /i/ and /y/. In the Old National Pronunciation, the former group were treated as palatals, but the latter group remained as alveolars.
3. A distinction between /e/ and /o/.
4. Preservation of the checked tone (traditional Chinese: 入聲; simplified Chinese: 入声; pinyin: rùshēng). Although how it was to be realized was not specifically detailed in the original dictionary, it was often pronounced with a final glottal stop, as in Lower Yangtze Mandarin varieties such as the Nanjing dialect.

The actual phonetic values of these tones were not prescribed in the 1919 edition of the Dictionary of National Pronunciation. Although various proposals of merging values from different areas of China were raised, the de facto standard was to use the tonal system of Beijing, and to simply read the entering tone (which the Beijing dialect lacked as a distinctive tone) as a shortened departing tone, falling in nature, as shown from sets of gramophone recordings of Wang Pu, a member of the Commission, and of noted linguist Yuen Ren Chao.

Example pronunciations
Character	ONP		Standard Mandarin		Nanjing Mandarin		Suzhou Wu		Middle Chinese
Character	IPA	Modified Pinyin	IPA	Pinyin	IPA	Pinyin	IPA	Wugniu	Middle Chinese
我 'I, me'	/ŋo/	ngǒ	/wo/	wǒ	/o/	o	/ŋəu/	ngou6	ngaX
未 'not yet'	/veɪ/	vèi	/weɪ/	wèi	/wəi/	wei	/vi/ [viⱼ]	vi6	mjɨjH
年 'year'	/ɲian/	gnián	/njɛn/	nián	/lien/	liän	/ȵɪ/ [ɲi]	gnie2	nen
京 'capital'	/tɕiŋ/	jīng	/tɕiŋ/	jīng	/tɕin/	jin	/tɕin/	cin1	kjaeng
精 'pure'	/tsiŋ/	zīng	/tɕiŋ/	jīng	/tsin/	zin	/tsin/	tsin1	tsjeng
一 'one'	/iʔ/	ìq	/i/	yī	/iʔ/	i	/iəʔ/	iq7	ʔjit

== Phonetic symbols ==
Characters with their pronunciations

The notation used to indicate the prescribed pronunciation was zhuyin zimu (also known as zhuyin fuhao), as adopted by the Commission on the Unification of Pronunciation.

In the following tables, the zhuyin fuhao symbols are shown with equivalents in the IPA and modern pinyin (where applicable).

Chart of Initials
		Bilabial	Alveolar	Retroflex	(Alveolo)- Palatal	Velar
Nasal		ㄇ [m] m	ㄋ [n] n		ㄬ [ɲ] gn (Note: See doi:10.7817/jameroriesoci.137.1.0063)	ㄫ [ŋ] ng
Stop	unaspirated	ㄅ [p] b	ㄉ [t] d			ㄍ [k] g
Stop	aspirated	ㄆ [pʰ] p	ㄊ [tʰ] t			ㄎ [kʰ] k
Affricate	unaspirated		ㄗ [ts] z	ㄓ [ʈʂ] zh	ㄐ [tɕ] j	
Affricate	aspirated		ㄘ [tsʰ] c	ㄔ [ʈʂʰ] ch	ㄑ [tɕʰ] q	
Fricative	voiceless	ㄈ [f] f	ㄙ [s] s	ㄕ [ʂ] sh	ㄒ [ɕ] x	ㄏ [x] h
Fricative	voiced	ㄪ [v] v (Note: Pinyin includes the letter v, but marks it as "reserved for dialects and borrowings". There are no official guidelines on its use, as the only guideline concerns Putonghua.)		ㄖ [ʐ] r		
Lateral			ㄌ [l] l			

Finals
		ㄚ	ㄛ	ㄝ	ㄞ	ㄜ	ㄟ	ㄠ	ㄡ	ㄢ	ㄣ	ㄤ	ㄥ	ㄦ
	[ɨ] i	[a] a	[ɔ] o	[ɛ] ê	[aɪ] ai	[ɤ] e	[eɪ] ei	[ɑʊ] ao	[oʊ] ou	[an] an	[ən] en	[ɑŋ] ang	[əŋ] eng	[əɻ] er
ㄧ	[i] i	[ia] ia	[iɔ] io	[iɛ] ie	[iaɪ] iai			[iɑʊ] iao	[iɔʊ] iu	[iɛn] ian	[in] in	[iɑŋ] iang	[iŋ] ing	
ㄨ	[u] u	[ua] ua	[uɔ] uo/o		[uaɪ] uai		[ueɪ] ui			[uan] uan	[uən] un	[uɑŋ] uang	[ʊŋ] ong	
ㄩ	[y] ü		[yɔ] üo	[yœ̜] üe						[yœ̜n] üan	[yn] ün		[iʊŋ] iong	

The tone system used at the time was different from the modern version of Bopomofo: the dark level tone was unmarked, and the light level, rising, departing and entering tone each had a single dot marked at the bottom left, top left, top right and bottom right corners respectively, thus resembling the tone-marking system of Middle Chinese to a large degree.

=== Example ===
Therefore, with this in mind, the following example can be derived:

- Example (Literary Chinese): 海納百川，有容乃大。
- Bopomofo: ㄏㄞˇ ㄋㄚ・ ㄅㄜ・ ㄔㄨㄢ，ㄧㄡˇ ㄩㄥˊ ㄋㄞˇ ㄉㄚˋ。
- Romanized Bopomofo: hai na pe chuan, iu iong nai da
- IPA: xaɪ na pɤ ʈʂʰuan, iɔʊ iʊŋ naɪ ta
- Translation: Using different means to obtain the same result; only those who can be tolerant are great.

Mandarin phonology for comparison:

- Bopomofo: ㄏㄞˇ ㄋㄚˋ ㄅㄞˇ ㄔㄨㄢ ， ㄧㄡˇ ㄖㄨㄥˊ ㄋㄞˇ ㄉㄚˋ 。
- Pinyin: hǎi nà bǎi chuān ， yǒu róng nǎi dà
- IPA: xaɪ21˦ na51 paɪ21˦ ʈʂʰwan55, joʊ21˦ ʐʊŋ35 naɪ21˦ ta51

== See also ==
- Revised National Pronunciation Dictionary (February 1921) on Wikimedia Commons
- 新定國音發音法 (1919) on Wikimedia Commons
- 國音教本 (1920) on Wikimedia Commons
- 國音自習法 (1920) on Wikimedia Commons
- 音韻常識 (1925) on Wikimedia Commons
