= Porsche C88 =

Concept car developed by Porsche for the Chinese market

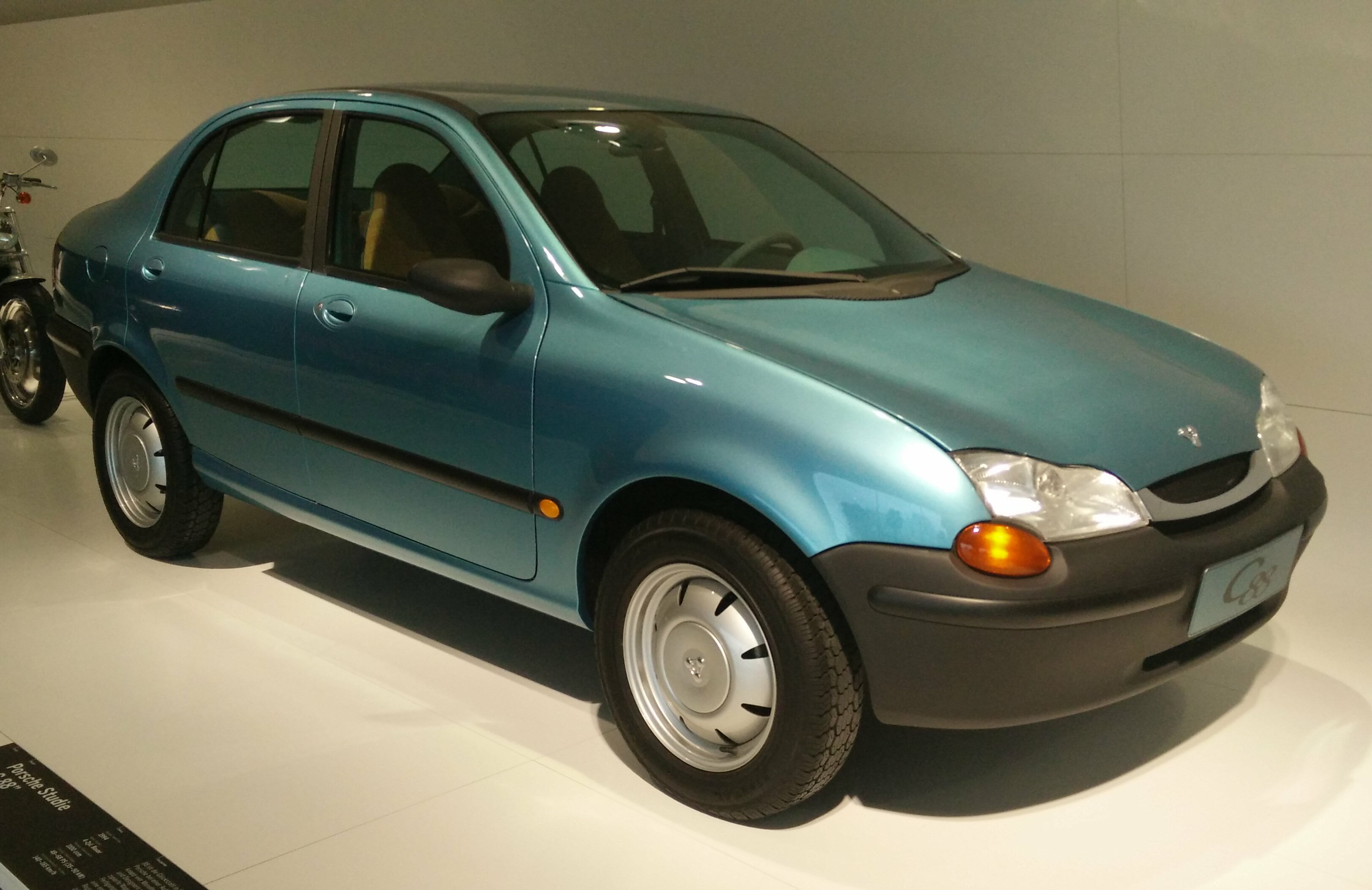

Overview
- Type: Concept car
- Manufacturer: Porsche; Stola
- Production: 1994; 1 prototype

Body and chassis
- Body style: 4-door sedan
- Layout: Front-engine, front-wheel-drive

Powertrain
- Engine: 1.1 L Type 369 H4
- Transmission: 5-speed manual

Dimensions
- Length: 4,030 mm (158.7 in)
- Width: 1,620 mm (63.8 in)
- Height: 1,420 mm (55.9 in)

The Porsche C88 was a prototype family car designed for the Chinese market in 1994 by Porsche in response to the Chinese government's invitation to a number of international automotive manufacturers for a new range of cars. It was completed in four months by Porsche engineers and was displayed to the public at the 1994 Beijing Auto Show. The prototype is now on display in the Porsche Museum in Stuttgart, Germany.

The four-door compact sedan body was unlike any other Porsche, and did not feature the Porsche badge anywhere. It was designed with only one child seat--reflecting Chinese population control policy. The prototype was presented by CEO Wendelin Wiedeking, who learned his speech in Mandarin. According to Porsche Museum director Dieter Landenberger, "The Chinese government said thank you very much and took the ideas for free, and if you look at Chinese cars now, you can see many details of our C88 in them."

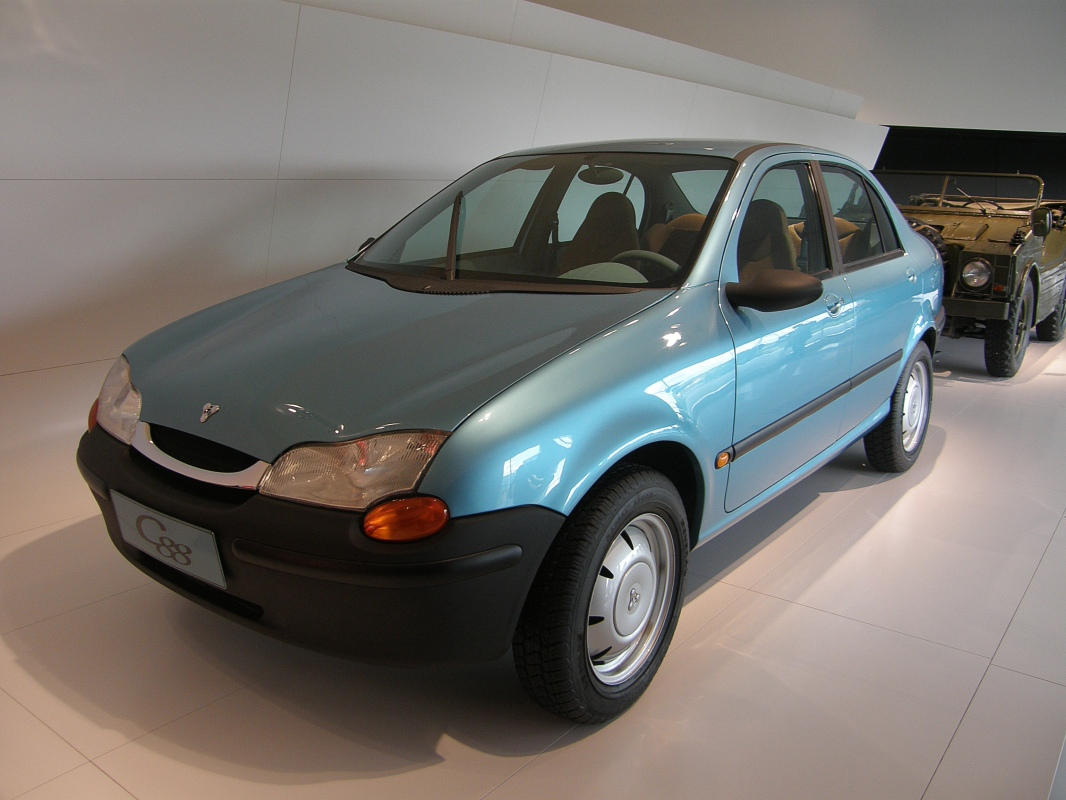
Porsche C88 at the Porsche Museum, Stuttgart

The C88 was intended to broaden the market for Porsche designs to India, where it was also unsuccessful. In the 1980s and 1990s, Porsche was involved in engineering small cars for a range of manufacturers, including the Audi RS2, Lada Samara, and SEAT Ibiza.
