= Wang Zhao =

Wang Zhao may refer to:

- Wang Zhao (politician)
- Wang Zhao (linguist)
