= Standard Chinese (disambiguation) =

Standard Chinese is the official language of China

Standard Chinese may also refer to:

- Written vernacular Chinese, the standard for written Chinese
- Mandarin (late imperial lingua franca), the spoken standard of the Ming and Qing dynasties
- Mandarin Chinese, the most widely spoken form of dialect on which Standard Chinese is based
