= Guanhua =

Guanhua may refer to:

- Mandarin Chinese
- Mandarin (late imperial lingua franca)
- Standard Chinese
