= Subei people =

People of the Subei region (northern Jiangsu province)

江淮民系

Total population
- More than 29.76 million in China

Regions with significant populations
- China (Northern Jiangsu, Northern Yangtze Delta, Huizhou, and Shanghai)

Languages
- Mandarin Chinese (Jianghuai as primary, Standard as secondary)

Religion
- Atheism, Buddhism, Chinese folk religion, Christianity and Taoism

Related ethnic groups
- Jianghuai people, Huizhou people and other Han Chinese

The Subei people (simplified Chinese: 苏北人; traditional Chinese: 蘇北人), also known as Jiangbei People (Chinese: 江北人; pinyin: Jiāngběirén), are a Jianghuai Mandarin-speaking Han Chinese people of the Subei region (northern Jiangsu province).

Due to natural disasters and insurrections in their native region, during the Qing and the Republican periods, they migrated in large numbers to the Wu-speaking Jiangnan region (south of the Yangtze), especially Shanghai.

The Subei culture was seen a symbol of sophistication during the mid-Qing dynasty period, but lost its status after China entered Railway era instead of Canal Age.

== Diaspora (outside of Jiangbei) ==
In the Ming Dynasty and Qing dynasties, Jianghuai speakers moved and settled into Hui dialect areas.

== Notable people ==
- Zhou Enlai
- Jiang Zemin
