= Nanjing dialect =

Dialect of Jianghuai Mandarin

- Nankinese
- 南京話; Lan2 jin1 hua (Lánjìnhua)
- Pronunciation: /lã˨˦ tɕĩ˧˩ xua/
- Native to: People's Republic of China
- Region: Nanjing, Jiangsu province
- Language family: Sino-Tibetan: Sinitic; Chinese; Mandarin; Jianghuai; Nanjing dialect

Language codes
- ISO 639-3: –
- Glottolog: nanj1234

Nanjing dialect
- Traditional Chinese: 南京話
- Simplified Chinese: 南京话
- Literal meaning: Nanjing speech
Transcriptions
Standard Mandarin
- Hanyu Pinyin: Nánjīnghuà
- Wade–Giles: Nan-ching-hua
Wu
- Wugniu: noe^{2} cin^{1} ghe^{2} gho^{6} (Note: ～閒話 is used as the suffix to indicate a language variety in most of Northern Wu. As such, the provided pronunciation here is of 南京閒話 and not 南京話.)
- IPA: Shanghainese: [nø˩ tɕin˦ ɦe˩ ɦo˦]
Yue: Cantonese
- Jyutping: naam^{4} ging^{1} waa^{2*}
- IPA: [nam˩.kɪŋ˥.wa˧˥]

The Nanjing dialect, also known as Nanjing Mandarin, Nanjingese, Nankingese, or Nankinese, is the prestige dialect of Mandarin Chinese spoken in the urban area of Nanjing, the capital of Jiangsu province. It is part of the Jianghuai group of Chinese varieties.

== Phonology ==
A number of features distinguish the Nanjing dialect from other Mandarin varieties. It maintains the glottal stop final and the entering tone, which Northern Mandarin or Southwestern Mandarin likely also had until recently. Like Northern Mandarin, it has preserved the retroflex initials of Middle Chinese. As with other Jianghuai Mandarin dialects, the Nanjing dialect has lost syllable-initial /n/, which have all become /l/. The opposite has occurred in Southwestern Mandarin, where /l/ has changed to /n/. Northern Mandarin, on the other hand, retains distinct /l/ and /n/ initials.

While Mandarin dialects typically feature two nasal finals (/n/ and /ŋ/), these have merged into one in Jianghuai Mandarin dialects.

=== Expansion ===
The earliest dialect of Nanjing was an ancient Subei dialect spoken by the Subei barbarians/Huaiyi during the Eastern Jin. After the Wu Hu uprising, the Jin Emperor and many northern Chinese fled south, establishing the new capital Jiankang in what is modern day Nanjing. Further events occurred, such as Hou Jing's rebellions during the Liang dynasty, the Sui dynasty invasion of the Chen dynasty which resulted in Jiankang's destruction, Ming Taizu's relocation of Central Asia's Muslim Indo-Iranians and Muslim Mongols to Nanjing, over a 20% of the population of Nanjing was Mongolian Central Asians and Indo-Iranian foreigners from Central Asia and Muslim Mongols in Nanjing from and the establishment of Nanjing as the capital of the Taiping Kingdom which resulted in a significant decrease in the city's population. These events all played a role in forming the Nanjing dialect of today.

=== Old Nanjing dialect ===
Old Nanjing dialect is mostly found in old communities in Nanjing itself, and was the main form spoken in the 1930s.

Initials of Old Nanjing dialect
| | | Labial | Denti-alveolar | Retroflex | Alveolo-palatal | Velar |
|---|---|---|---|---|---|---|
| Stop | aspirated | pʰ | tʰ | | | kʰ |
| Stop | unaspirated | p | t | | | k |
| Affricate | aspirated | | t͡sʰ | ʈ͡ʂʰ | t͡ɕʰ | |
| Affricate | unaspirated | | t͡s | ʈ͡ʂ | t͡ɕ | |
| Fricative | | f | s | ʂ | ɕ | x |
| Sonorant | | m | l | ɻ | | |

There is no /n/, it has been merged with /l/

Finals of Old Nanjing dialect
| Nucleus | | ∅ | /ɒ/ | /o/ | /e/ | /aæ/ | /əi/ | /au/ | /əu/ | /ã/ | /ẽ/ | /əŋ/ | /oŋ/ | /əɹ/ |
|---|---|---|---|---|---|---|---|---|---|---|---|---|---|---|
| Medial | ∅ | ɹ̩/ɻ̩ | ɒ̝ | o/ɔ̆ | e̽/ɛ̆ | aæ | ə̙i | a̙ʊ | ə̙ʊ | ã̙ | | əŋ | o̝ŋ | eɹ |
| Medial | /i/ | i | iɒ̝ | iɔ̆ | ie | iaæ | | ia̙ʊ | iə̙ʊ | iã̙ | iẽ | iŋ | io̝ŋ | |
| Medial | /u/ | u̜ | uɒ̝ | | uɛ̆ | uaæ | uə̙i | | | uã̙ | | uən | | |
| Medial | /y/ | y | | | ye̽/yɛ̆ | | | | | | yẽ | yin | | |

=== New Nanjing dialect ===
New Nanjing dialect is the variety most frequently spoken in Nanjing of today, and is often simply referred to as the "Nanjing dialect". It has more influence from the Beijing dialect.

Initials of New Nanjing dialect
| | | Labial | Denti-alveolar | Retroflex | Alveolo-palatal | Velar |
|---|---|---|---|---|---|---|
| Stop | aspirated | pʰ | tʰ | | | kʰ |
| Stop | unaspirated | p | t | | | k |
| Affricate | aspirated | | t͡sʰ | ʈ͡ʂʰ | t͡ɕʰ | |
| Affricate | unaspirated | | t͡s | ʈ͡ʂ | t͡ɕ | |
| Fricative | | f | s | ʂ, ʐ | ɕ | x |
| Sonorant | | m | l | | | |

Finals of New Nanjing dialect
| Nucleus | | ∅ | /a/ | /ɛ/ | /e/ | /o/ | /ɔ/ | /əi/ | /əɯ/ | /ã/ | /ẽ/ | /õ/ | /ə̃/ | /ɚ/ |
|---|---|---|---|---|---|---|---|---|---|---|---|---|---|---|
| Medial | ∅ | ɹ̩/ɻ̩ | a | ɛ | e | o | ɔ | əi | əɯ | ã | ẽ | õ | ə̃ | ɚ |
| Medial | /i/ | i | ia | iɛ | ie | io | iɔ | | iəɯ | iã | iẽ | iõ | ĩ | |
| Medial | /u/ | u̜ | ua | uɛ | | | | uəi | | uã | | | uə̃ | |
| Medial | /y/ | y | | | ye | | | | | | yẽ | | yĩ | |

== Prominence ==
Some linguists have studied the influence that Nanjing Jianghuai Mandarin had on the Mandarin-based koiné spoken by the Ming dynasty. Although it was based on the Nanjing dialect, there were important differences and the koiné exhibited non-Jianghuai characteristics. Francisco Varo, a Dominican friar living in 17th century China pointed to Nanjing as one of several places Mandarin speech paralleled that of the elites.

During the 19th century, dispute arose over whether the Nanjing dialect or Beijing dialect should be preferred by Western diplomats and translators, as the prestige of the Nanjing dialect seemed to be waning. Even when it was clear that the Beijing dialect had gained prominence, many sinologists and missionaries maintained their preference for the Nanjing dialect. Leipzig-based professor Georg von der Gabelentz even argued that the Nanjing dialect was preferable for scientific texts because it had fewer homophones:

Only in recent times has the northern dialect, pek-kuān-hoá, in the form [spoken] in the capital, kīng-hoá [京話], begun to strive for general acceptance, and the struggle seems to be decided in its favor. It is preferred by the officials and studied by the European diplomats. Scholarship must not follow this practise. The Peking dialect is phonetically the poorest of all dialects and therefore has the most homophones. This is why it is most unsuitable for scientific purposes.

The originally Japanese book Mandarin Compass (官話指南) was modified with Nanjing dialect's tones and published with French commentary by Jiangnan-based French missionary Henri Boucher. Calvin W. Mateer attempted to compromise between Northern and Southern Mandarin in his book A Course of Mandarin Lessons, published in 1892.

== Study of the Nanjing dialect ==
Important works written about the Nanjing dialect include Syllabar des Nankingdialektes oder der correkten Aussprache sammt Vocabular by Franz Kühnert, and Die Nanking Kuanhua by K. Hemeling.

The English & Chinese vocabulary in the court dialect by Samuel Wells Williams was based on the Nanjing dialect, rather than the Beijing dialect. Williams also described the differences between Nanjing and Beijing Mandarin in the same book and noted the ways in which the Peking dialect differs from the Nanjing dialect, such as the palatalization of velars before front vowels. Williams also noted that the changes were consistent so that switching between pronunciations would not be difficult.

=== Romanization ===
In the 19th and early 20th centuries, romanization of Mandarin consisted of both Beijing and Nanjing pronunciations. The Chinese Recorder and Missionary Journal offered that romanizing for both Nanjing and Beijing dialects was beneficial. The journal explained that, for example, because 希 and 西 are pronounced the same in Beijing (pinyin: xī) but differently in Nanjing (with the latter being si), the Standard System retains the two spellings. The system similarly retains contrasts in Beijing that are missing in Nanjing, such as that between 官 (pinyin: guān) and 光 (pinyin: guāng).
