= Jianghuai Mandarin =

Dialect of Mandarin

- Lower Yangtze Mandarin, Huai Chinese
- Region: Between the Huai and Yangtze Rivers, primarily in central Anhui, Jiangsu, and eastern Hubei
- Ethnicity: Jianghuai people Subei people
- Speakers: 86.05 million (2012)
- Language family: Sino-Tibetan: Sinitic; Chinese; Mandarin; Jianghuai Mandarin
- Writing system: Written vernacular Chinese

Language codes
- ISO 639-3: None (mis)
- ISO 639-6: juai
- Glottolog: jing1262
- Linguasphere: 79-AAA-bi
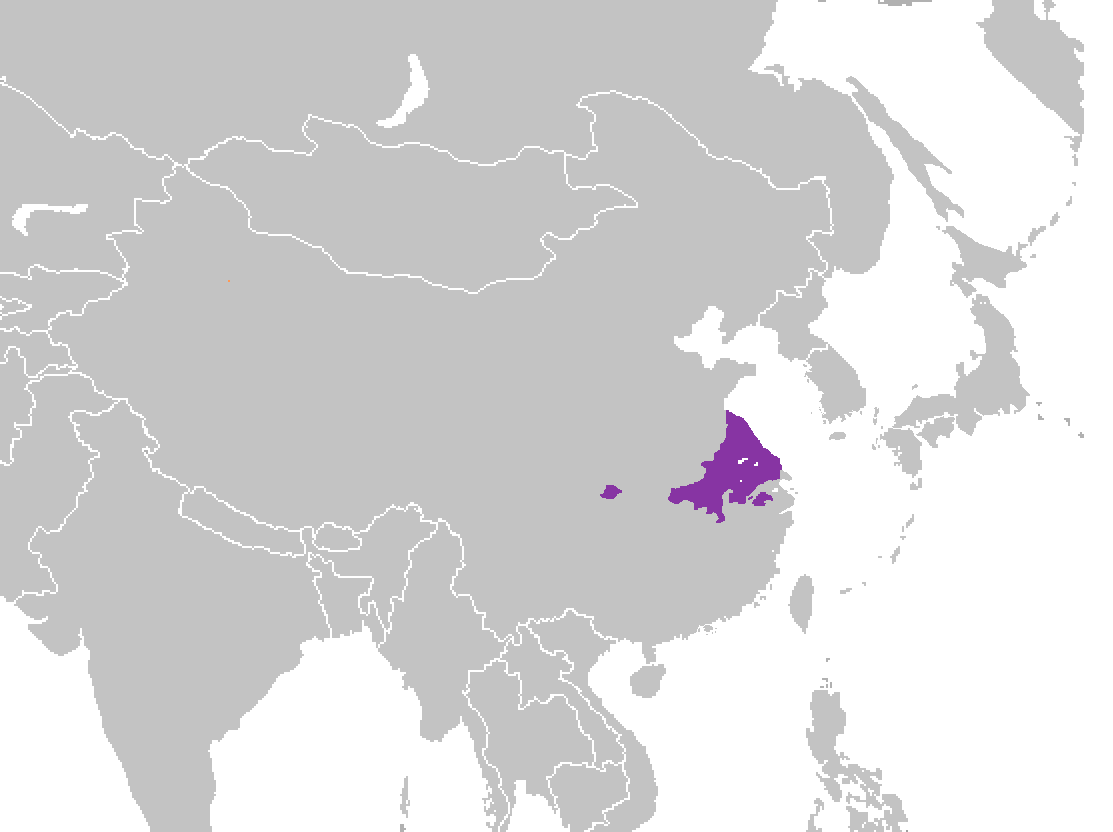

Huang–Xiao Western Hongchao Eastern Hongchao Tong-Tai / Tai–Ru

Jianghuai Mandarin (traditional Chinese: 江淮官話; simplified Chinese: 江淮官话; pinyin: Jiānghuái Guānhuà) is one of the most divergent and least mutually-intelligible of the Mandarin language varieties, as it neighbours the Wu, Hui, and Gan groups of Sinitic languages. It is also known as Lower Yangtze Mandarin (traditional Chinese: 下江官話; simplified Chinese: 下江官话; pinyin: Xiàjiāng Guānhuà), named after the Yangtze (Jiang) and Huai Rivers. Lower Yangtze is distinguished from most other Mandarin varieties by the retention of a final glottal stop in words that ended in a stop consonant in Middle Chinese.

During the Ming dynasty and early Qing dynasty, the lingua franca of administration was based on Lower Yangtze Mandarin. In the 19th century the base shifted to the Beijing dialect.

== Geographic distribution ==
Jianghuai Mandarin is spoken in central Anhui, eastern Hubei, most of Jiangsu north of the Yangtze, as well as the area around Nanjing. The number of speakers was estimated in 1987 at 67 million.

== Subgrouping ==
The Language Atlas of China divides Lower Yangtze Mandarin into three branches:

Hongchao dialects
The largest and most widespread branch, mostly concentrated in Jiangsu and Anhui provinces, with smaller areas in Zhejiang province. The best-known variety is Nanjing dialect. Other cities in the area are Hefei in the west and Yangzhou, Zhenjiang and Yancheng in the east.
Tong-Tai / Tai–Ru
Mostly spoken in the eastern Jiangsu prefectures of Taizhou and Nantong (including Rugao).
Huang–Xiao
Mostly spoken in the prefectures of Huanggang and Xiaogan in eastern Hubei province and the area around Jiujiang in northern Jiangxi, with an island in western Hubei around Zhushan, and another in Anhui around Anqing.

There are also small islands of Jianghuai Mandarin (軍家話, Jūnjiāhuà) throughout Guangdong, Guangxi, Hainan and Fujian provinces, brought to these areas during the Ming dynasty by soldiers from Jiangsu, Anhui and Henan during the reign of Hongwu Emperor.

The Huizhou dialects, spoken in southern Anhui, share different features with Wu, Gan and Lower Yangtze Mandarin, making them difficult to classify. Earlier scholars had assigned them to one or other of those groups or to a top-level group of their own. The Atlas adopted the latter position, but it remains controversial.

=== Relations to other groups ===
The relationship of the Jianghuai Mandarin varieties to other varieties of Chinese has been an ongoing subject of debate. One quantitative study from the late 20th century by linguist Chin-Chuan Cheng focused on vocabulary lists, yielding the result that Eastern dialects of Jianghuai cluster with the Xiang and Gan varieties, whilst Northern and Southern Mandarin, despite being supposedly "genetically" related, were not in the original 35-word list. In the 100-word list they did cluster, albeit with other varieties.

Some Chinese linguists like Ting have claimed that Jianghuai is mostly Wu containing a superstratum of Mandarin; for example, the frequency and usage of the postposition 阿 as a postverbal aspect marker in the Taixing dialect of Jianghuai Mandarin can be seen as intermediate between Standard Mandarin, which tends to omit postverbal prepositions, and the Wu varieties, which tend towards omission of preverbal prepositions.

When vowels from Jianghuai Mandarin and Wu were compared to dialects from China's southeastern coast, it was concluded "that chain-type shifts in Chinese follow the same general rules as have been revealed by Labov for American and British English dialects."

Dialogue from literature published in Yangzhou, such as the 18th-century novel Qingfengzha (simplified Chinese: 清风闸; traditional Chinese: 清風閘; pinyin: Qīng Fēng Zhá), contains evidence of a Jianghuai dialect being an expression of identity clearly differentiated from that of others: locals spoke the dialect, as opposed to sojourners, who spoke Huizhou dialect or Wu dialects. Large numbers of merchants from Huizhou lived in Yangzhou and effectively were responsible for keeping the town economically afloat.

Professor Richard VanNess Simmons has claimed that the Hangzhou dialect, rather than being Wu as it was classified by Yuen Ren Chao, is a Mandarin dialect closely related to Jianghuai Mandarin. Simmons claimed that, had Chao compared the Hangzhou dialect to the Common Wu syllabary that Chao developed, as well as to Jianghuai Mandarin, he would have found more similarities to Jianghuai than to Wu.

== Phonology ==
A characteristic feature of Jianghuai Mandarin is the treatment of Middle Chinese syllable-final stops. Middle Chinese syllables with vocalic or nasal codas had a three-way tonal contrast. Syllables with stop codas (-p, -t and -k) had no phonemic tonal contrast, but were traditionally treated as comprising a fourth category, called the entering tone. In modern Mandarin varieties, the former three-way contrast has been reorganized as four tones that are generally consistent across the group, though the pitch values of the tones vary considerably. In most varieties, including the Beijing dialect on which Standard Chinese is based, the final stops have disappeared, and these syllables have been divided between the tones in different ways in different subgroups. In Lower Yangtze Mandarin, however, the stop codas have merged as a glottal stop, but these syllables remain separate from the four tonal categories shared with other Mandarin varieties. A similar development is also found in the adjacent Wu dialect group, and in the Jin group, which many linguists include within Mandarin.

In Jianghuai varieties, the initial /n-/ has merged with /l-/. These initials have also merged in Southwestern Mandarin, but as /n-/; most other Mandarin varieties distinguish these initials. The Middle Chinese retroflex initials have merged with affricate initials in non-Mandarin varieties, and also in Southwestern Mandarin and most Lower Yangtze varieties. However, the Nanjing dialect retains the distinction, like northern Mandarin varieties. Most Lower Yangtze varieties retain a /ʐ-/ initial, but in central Jiangsu (including Yangzhou) it has merged with /l-/. The Tai–Ru varieties of eastern-central Jiangsu retain a distinct /ŋ-/ initial, but this has merged with the zero initial in other Mandarin varieties.

It has been claimed that the Jianghuai varieties of Mandarin around Nanjing are an exception to the normal occurrence of the three medials [i], [y] and [u] in Mandarin, along with eastern Shanxi and some Southwestern Mandarin dialects.

== Literary and colloquial readings ==
The existence of literary and colloquial readings is a notable feature of Jianghuai Mandarin.

Example	Colloquial reading	Literary reading	Meaning	Standard Mandarin pronunciation
斜	tɕia	tɕiɪ	oblique	ɕiɛ
摘	tiɪʔ	tsəʔ	pick	tʂai
去	kʰɪ	tɕʰy	go	tɕʰy
锯	ka	tɕy	cut	tɕy
下	xa	ɕia	down	ɕia
横	xoŋ	xən	across	xəŋ
严	æ̃	iɪ̃	strict	ian [jɛn]
挂	kʰuɛ	kua	hang	kua
蹲	sən	tən	crouch	tuən
虹	kaŋ	xoŋ	rainbow	xoŋ

== History ==
=== Early history ===
The original dialect of Nanjing in the Eastern Jin dynasty was a form of Wu Chinese. After the Wu Hu uprising, the Jin Emperor and many northern Chinese fled south, bringing their variety of Chinese with them. The new capital of Eastern Jin was established at Jiankang (Chinese: 建康; pinyin: Jiànkāng), now Nanjing, thus beginning to shift the local speech towards northern influences. However, due to its role as capital and events such as Hou Jing's rebellions during the Liang dynasty and the Sui dynasty invasion of the Chen dynasty, Jiankang was destroyed and rebuilt several times.

Immigrants from Northern China during the middle of the Song dynasty during the Jin–Song Wars brought a variety which became Jianghuai Mandarin. This came to serve as a superstratum variety, providing a source of literary readings for Northern Wu.

=== Ming dynasty ===
Jianghuai Mandarin was likely the native variety of the founding emperor of the Ming dynasty, Zhu Yuanzhang, and also of many of his military and civil officials. Many southerners from below the Yangtze were relocated to Nanjing, which had been designated the capital. Thus formed the foundation for the Mandarin (simplified Chinese: 官话; traditional Chinese: 官話; pinyin: Guānhuà), the court dialect or koiné, of the early Ming era.

Western missionaries and Korean Hangul writings of the Ming Guanhua and the Nanjing dialect provide evidence that Guanhua was a koiné and mixture of various dialects, strongly based on Jianghuai. For example, it retained the distinction between final -/n/ and -/ŋ/, which was merged early on in Jianghuai Mandarin, including in Nanjing.

Nonetheless, some non-Nanjing characteristics can be clearly discerned in official court Mandarin. Matteo Ricci's Dicionário Português-Chinês in its description of Ming dynasty Mandarin documented a number of words that appear to be derived from Jianghuai Mandarin dialect, such as "pear, jujube, shirt, ax, hoe, joyful, to speak, to bargain, to know, to urinate, to build a house, busy, and not yet." It also provides evidence for some key differences in phonology between court Mandarin and Nanjing Mandarin. For example, the court koine followed eastern and southeastern variants of Jianghuai in using rounded finals in lexemes such as 全 (/tsʰyon/) and 船 (/tʂʰuɔn/), whilst in the Nanjing dialect these are pronounced with unrounded vowels (in this example, /tsʰyɛn/ and /tʂʰuɛn/ respectively).

In the early Ming period, Wu speakers moved into the eastern regions of Jiangsu, giving rise to the Tong-Tai branch, whilst Gan speakers from Jiangxi moved into the regions further west of the Lower Yangtze, giving rise to the Huang–Xiao varieties. Jianghuai speakers also moved into Hui dialect areas.

Even though in 1421 the Ming dynasty moved its political and administrative capital from Nanjing to Beijing, the Jianghuai-based pronunciation centered on Nanjing retained prestige throughout the late Ming. In the late seventeenth century, Francisco Varo advised that to learn Chinese, one must acquire it from "Not just any Chinese, but only those who have the natural gift of speaking the Mandarin language well, such as those natives of the Province of Nan king, and of other provinces where the Mandarin tongue is spoken well."

=== Qing dynasty ===
Jianghuai Mandarin, along with Northern Mandarin, formed the standard for Baihua before and during the Qing dynasty. It was only in the mid-1800s that the northern standard based on the Beijing dialect gained dominance in its influence on the Baihua standard. Baihua was used by writers all over China, regardless of the dialect spoken, thus bringing a familiarity with the written norms of Jianghuai Mandarin to readers of vernacular literature across the country. Chinese writers who spoke other dialects had to use the grammar and the vocabulary of Jianghuai and Northern Mandarin for the majority of Chinese people to understand their writing.

The origin of Peking opera is associated with the dialect, with many of the mid to late eighteenth century opera troupes entertaining the Qing court in Beijing coming from the provinces of Anhui and Hubei that spoke various dialects, including varieties of Jianghuai Mandarin. Additionally, Huangmei opera, from Anqing in Anhui Province, makes substantial use of its local dialect.

=== Contemporary history ===
Jianghuai Mandarin has been overtaking Wu as the language variety of multiple counties in Jiangsu in the late 20th and early 21st centuries. An example is the former Zaicheng Town (Chinese: 在城镇; pinyin: Zàichéng zhèn), in Lishui County, Nanjing (Chinese: 溧水; pinyin: Lìshuǐ). Both Jianghuai and Wu were spoken in several towns in Lishui, with Wu being spoken by more people in more towns than Jianghuai. Wu is called "old Zaicheng Speech", and Jianghuai dialect is called "new Zaicheng speech", with Wu being limited to a small community of elderly, speaking it to relatives. The Jianghuai dialect was present there for about a century, even though all the surrounding areas around the town are Wu-speaking. Jianghuai was always confined to the urban area itself until the 1960s, but it has now overtaken Wu.
