= Francisco Varo =

Francisco Varo (October 4, 1627 – January 31, 1687) was a Spanish Dominican friar, missionary in China, and author of the second grammar of Mandarin Chinese in a western language, "Arte de la lengua mandarina" (1703). His Chinese names were Wan Fangjige (Chinese: 萬方濟各; pinyin: wàn fāngjìgè Vuán Fāng Çhí kǒ) and Wan Jiguo (Chinese: 萬濟國; pinyin: wàn jìguó).

== Life ==
Varo was born in the city of Seville. On October 8, 1643, Varo joined the Dominican order in the convent of San Pablo. Varo then embarked on his journey to China when Juan Bautista de Morales recruited volunteers to carry out missions in the East, Varo was among them. He began a journey to China via Mexico and the Philippines. On June 12, 1646, Varo sailed to Veracruzin Mexico from Sanlucar de Barrameda. The trip to Manila in the Philippines was delayed by the presence of Dutch ships, but they started out from April 12, 1648, arriving in early July.

It was planned form the beginning that Varo go to China, but he still spent a year among the Chinese community in Manila to learn the language. On July 10, 1649, he departed from Pasig, near Manila, and arrived on August 3 in Fujian, at a part near Amoy, and then moved onto Fuan to his mission. Fujian's coast came under attack by the Ming dynasty loyalist Koxinga, who was very active between 1624 and 1662. the Qing Emperor ordered the evacuation of the coast in 1662 to undermine support for Koxinga, which allowed Spanish, Portuguese, and Dutch influence to increase on the coast. From 1671 to 1672 Varo was exiled to Canton by the Qing dynasty government for religious reasons.

Varo studied the Chinese language there, both Mandarin and the local dialect. He was among the few who managed to master the complicated form of the language of the legal system and formal hearings. His superiors made him Chinese teacher for other missionaries.

He was appointed Vicar provincial repeatedly. On January 31, 1687, he was elected Vicar Apostolic of the provinces of Guangdong (Archdiocese of Guangzhou), Guangxi (Archdiocese of Nanning), and Yunnan (Archdiocese of Kunming).

He died in Fuzhou, China.

== Work ==
Most of Varo's numerous writings were not printed during his lifetime due to lack of funds. He wrote several religious works, including a treatise on the Chinese Rites controversy. During his exile in 1671 he wrote "The Manifestor and Declaration", two treatises heavily influenced by the thought of his superior Juan Bautista de Morales and were later used as the basis of the decrees of the nuncios in the East Indies and China. His letters are an excellent source about life in the missions of his time.

He also wrote two Romanized Chinese dictionaries, "Vocabulario da lingoa mandarina", in Portuguese, and the "Vocabulario de la lengua Mandarina" in Spanish, finished in 1670 and 1692, respectively.

His most important work was "Arte de la lengua mandarina" (1703), the second grammar of The Chinese language in a Western language which survived (after that of Martino Martini, which dates back to 1656). It was published after his death by Fr. Pedro de la Pinuela in Canton. Varo knew of a previous grammar by Francisco Diaz, and possibly the work of Juan Bautista Morales, grammars which have both been lost, and he was also influenced by the grammar of Antonio de Nebrija. Varo's grammar is not of the Mandarin Chinese of Beijing, so it is not a "predecessor" of modern Standard Mandarin, but it is a koine which was spoken between the sixteenth and eighteenth centuries in Nanjing.

=== Grammars on Mandarin ===
- "Arte de la lengua mandarina" (1703)
- .Francisco Varo; Weldon South Coblin (2000). Weldon South Coblin (ed.). Francisco Varo's grammar of the Mandarin language (1703): an English transl. of Arte de la lengua Mandarina. Vol. 93 of Amsterdam studies in the theory and history of linguistic science / 3. John Benjamins Publishing Company. p. 282. ISBN 1-55619-606-7.

Varo advised people learning Mandarin (Guanhua) to specifically seek out Chinese from Mandarin speaking provinces to learn the language properly, using Nanjing as an example.

=== Other work ===
- Estratto del trattato composto dal reverendissimo padre fr. Francesco Varo de l'Ordine de'Predicatori ... circa il culto, offerte, riti, e cerimonie, che pratticano i chinesi in honore del loro maestro Confusio, e progenitori defonti (1700)
