= Wang Zhao (linguist) =

Chinese linguist (1859–1933)

- 王照

Wang Zhao (Note: Chinese: 王照; pinyin: Wáng Zhào, courtesy name Xiaohang (小航), art names Luzhong Qiongshi (蘆中窮士), Shuidong (水東)) (1859 – 1933) was a Chinese linguist and advocate of modern phonetic writing. Wang was from Ninghe, Tianjin in the province of Zhili. He created a syllabary for Chinese writing based on Mandarin called the Mandarin Alphabet (官话字母; 官話字母; Guānhuà zìmǔ). While this system is no longer used, Wang was the first to formally suggest the adoption of a national language for China based on Mandarin.

== Life ==
Wang Zhao lost his father when he was young and was raised by his uncle. In 1894, he was awarded the Jinshi Enke during the First Sino-Japanese War. In April of the twenty-first year of Guangxu, the museum was dismantled, and he was appointed as the chief of the Ministry of Rites. In 1898, he and Xu Shichang co-organized the No. 1 Primary School in Fengzhi of Eight Banners. During the 1898 Reform, he wanted to submit a letter to advise the Guangxu Emperor to honour Empress Dowager Cixi "to travel to China and foreign countries". After the Emperor Guangxu read the book, he ordered the six officials of the Ministry of Rites to be dismissed, who had obstructed the letter. After the failure of the Hundred Days' Reform, Wang fled to Japan.

Wang secretly returned to China in 1900, amid the Boxer Rebellion. In late May he arrived in Shanghai, where he visited the Baptist missionary Timothy Richard. After arriving in Tianjin, he resided with a distant relative for roughly a year. During this time, Wang took his primary inspiration for the design of the Mandarin Alphabet from the Subtle Explorations of Phonology (音韻闡微; Yīnyùn chǎnwēi), a rime dictionary commissioned by the Kangxi Emperor and published in 1726. In March 1904, the Qing court detained him after his reappearance in Beijing. Wang was ultimately pardoned and offered his old position back, but he did not accept. After Puyi ascended to the throne, the Pinyin Mandarin Newspaper violated the taboo of the Regent Prince Zaifeng. During the 1911 Revolution, Jiang Yanxing, the governor of the Jiangbei governor's office, sent Wang Zhao as a representative to Shanghai to attend the meeting of the provincial governor's office representative federation. After the revolution, he lived in Nanjing.

In 1913, he served as vice-chairman of the Union of Pronunciation Union, and later resigned. As S. Robert Ramsey tells it in his account of the proceedings:

Few of the delegates at the 1913 conference on pronunciation seem to have had any idea of what they were up against. The negotiations were marked by frustratingly naïve arguments. "Germany is strong," it was said, "because its language contains many voiced sounds and China is weak because Mandarin lacks them." But if linguistic knowledge was in short supply, commitment to position was not. Passions were hot, and frustrations grew. Finally, after months of no progress, Wang Zhao, the leader of the Mandarin faction, called for a new system of voting in which each province would have one and only one vote, knowing full well that the numerically superior Mandarin-speaking area would then automatically dominate. Delegates in other areas were incensed. The situation became explosive. Then, as tempers flared, Wang Rongbao, one of the leaders of the Southern faction, happened to use the colloquial Shanghai expression for "ricksha," wangbo ts'o. Wang Zhao misheard it for the Mandarin curse wángba dàn, "son of a bitch [literally turtle's egg]," and flew into a rage. He bared his arms and attacked Wang Rongbao, chasing him out of the assembly hall. Wang Rangbao never returned to the meetings. Wang Zhao's suggestion to change the voting procedure was adopted, and after three months of bitter struggling, the Mandarin faction had its way. The conference adopted a resolution recommending that the sounds of Mandarin become the national standard.

In his later years, he studied classics and advocated education to save the country. In 1933, Wang Zhao died.

== Family ==
The great-grandfather Wang Xipeng, was the chief soldier and died in the First Opium War. He has a brother Wang Xie and a younger brother Wang Zhuo.

== Books ==
- Preface to Liang Shuming's Preface to Mr. Wang Xiaohang's Wencun
- Mandarin Alphabet School Series
- Pinyin to Wenbaijia Surname
- Pinyin Dialogue Three Character Classic
- Pinyin Conversation with Thousand Characters
- Mandarin Alphabet Vocabulary
- Mandarin Alphabet Readings
- Water East Collection
- Book of Mandarin Pinyin for Beginners
- Mandarin Harmonic Alphabet
