= Orthoepy =

Correct pronunciation of a language

Orthoepy is the study of pronunciation of a particular language, within a specific oral tradition. The term is from the Greek ὀρθοέπεια orthoepeia, from ὀρθός orthos ('correct') and ἔπος epos ('speech'). The antonym is cacoepy "bad or wrong pronunciation". The pronunciation of the word orthoepy itself varies widely; the OED recognizes the variants /ˈɔːθəʊ.iːpi/, /ˈɔːθəʊ.ɛpi/, /ˈɔːθəʊ.ɨpi/, and /ɔːˈθəʊ.ɨpi/ for British English, as well as /ɔrˈθoʊ.əpi/ for American English.

The pronunciation is sometimes clarified with a diaeresis: orthoëpy, such as in the title of Edward Barrett Warman's Warman's Practical Orthoëpy and Critique, published in 1888 and found in Google Books.

Warman states on page 5: "Words possess three special characteristics: They have their Eye-life—Orthography. Ear-life—Orthoëpy. Soul-life—Significance." As with Warman's book, the purpose of this article is "to deal exclusively with the ear-life, or orthoëpy".

== Overview ==
In English grammar, orthoepy is the study of correct pronunciation prescribed for Standard English. This originally was understood to mean Received Pronunciation specifically, but other standards have emerged and been accepted since the early 20th century (e.g., General American, General Australian).

In ancient Greek, ὀρθοέπεια orthoepeia had the wider sense of "correct diction" (cf. LSJ ad loc., or the etymology in the OED), referencing correct pronunciation not just of individual words but also of entire passages, especially poetry, along with the distinction of good poetry vs. bad poetry. The archaic English term for this subject is orthology, and in this sense its opposite is solecism. The study of orthoepeia by the Greek sophists of the 5th century BCE, especially Prodicus (c. 396 BCE) and Protagoras, also included proto-logical concepts.

== See also ==
- English phonology
- Poetic diction
- Poetic Diction (a book by Owen Barfield)
- Phonaesthetics
