= Mandarin (late imperial lingua franca) =

Chinese language from 1368 to 1912

- Middle Mandarin
- 官話 Guānhuà
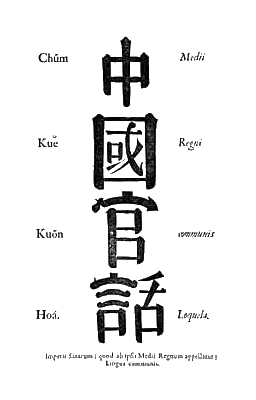
- Frontispiece of Fourmont's Chinese grammar (1742): Chũm Kuĕ Kuõn Hoá (中國官話), or Medii Regni Communis Loquela ('The Middle Kingdom's Common Speech')
- Region: China
- Era: Ming and Qing dynasties
- Language family: Sino-Tibetan: Sinitic; Chinese; Mandarin Chinese; Mandarin

Language codes
- ISO 639-3: –
- Glottolog: None

Mandarin (traditional Chinese: 官話; simplified Chinese: 官话; pinyin: Guānhuà; lit. 'official speech') was the common spoken language of administration of the Chinese empire during the Ming and Qing dynasties. It arose as a practical measure, due to the mutual unintelligibility of the varieties of Chinese spoken in different parts of China. Knowledge of this language was thus essential for an official career, but it was never formally defined. The language was a koiné based on Mandarin dialects. The southern variant spoken around Nanjing was prevalent in the late Ming and early Qing eras, but a form based on the Beijing dialect became dominant by the mid-19th century and developed into Standard Chinese in the 20th century. In some 19th-century works, it was called the court dialect.

== History ==
By the late imperial period, local varieties of Chinese had diverged to the extent that people from different provinces could not understand one another. In order to facilitate communication between officials from different provinces, and between officials and the inhabitants of the areas to which they were posted, imperial administrations adopted a koiné based on various northern dialects. Until well into the 19th century, this language was based on dialects spoken in the area of Nanjing, the first Ming capital and a major cultural centre, though not identical to any single dialect. The standard language of the Ming and early Qing, when it was based on lower Yangtze dialects, is sometimes called Middle Mandarin.

In 1375, the Hongwu Emperor commissioned a dictionary known as the Hóngwǔ Zhèngyùn (洪武正韻) intended to give a standard pronunciation. The dictionary was unsuccessful, criticised on one side for departing from the tradition of the Song dynasty rime dictionaries and rime tables, and on the other for not accurately reflecting the contemporary standard of elegant speech.

The Korean scholar Sin Sukchu published the Hongmu Jeong'un Yeokhun (洪武正韻譯訓 "Correct Rhymes from the Hongwu Reign with Korean Translation and Commentaries") in 1455, augmenting the Zhèngyùn by giving the Chinese pronunciation of each word using the newly created Hangul alphabet. In addition to these "standard readings", he recorded a rather different body of "popular readings", some of which are also preserved in the works of Ch'oe Sejin. Kim Kwangjo, in his extensive study of these materials, concluded that Sin's standard readings constitute an idealized phonology of the earlier dictionary, while the popular readings reflect contemporary speech. In contrast, Yùchí Zhìpíng and Weldon South Coblin hold that the two readings reflect different versions of 15th-century standard speech.

The term Guānhuà (官話; 官话), or "language of the officials", first appeared in Chinese sources in the mid-16th century. Later in that century, the Jesuit missionary Matteo Ricci used the term in his diary:

Besides the various dialects of the different provinces, the province vernacular so to speak, there is also a spoken language common to the whole Empire, known as the Quonhoa, an official language for civil and forensic use. [...] The Quonhoa dialect is now in vogue among the cultured classes, and is used between strangers and the inhabitants of the province they may visit.

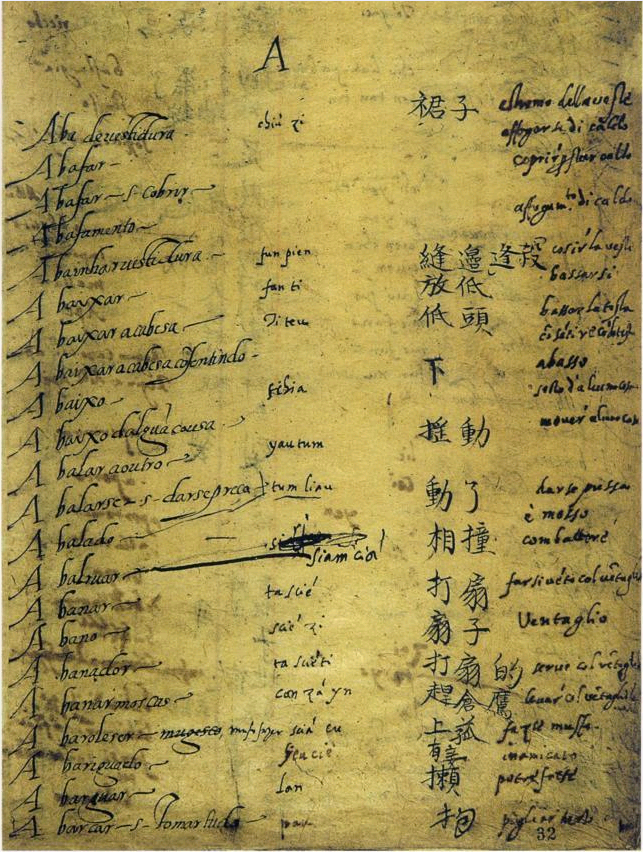
First page of Ricci and Ruggieri's Portuguese-Mandarin dictionary

The missionaries recognized the utility of this standard language, and embarked on its study. They translated the term Guānhuà into European languages as língua mandarim (Portuguese) and la lengua mandarina (Spanish), meaning the language of the mandarins, or imperial officials. Ricci and Michele Ruggieri published a Portuguese-Mandarin dictionary in the 1580s. Nicolas Trigault's guide to Mandarin pronunciation was published in 1626. Grammars of Mandarin were produced by Francisco Varo (finished in 1672 but not printed until 1703) and Joseph Prémare (1730).

In 1728, the Yongzheng Emperor, unable to understand the accents of officials from Guangdong and Fujian, issued a decree requiring the governors of those provinces to provide for the teaching of proper pronunciation. Although the resulting Academies for Correct Pronunciation (正音書院, Zhèngyīn Shūyuàn) were short-lived, the decree did spawn a number of textbooks that give some insight into the ideal pronunciation.

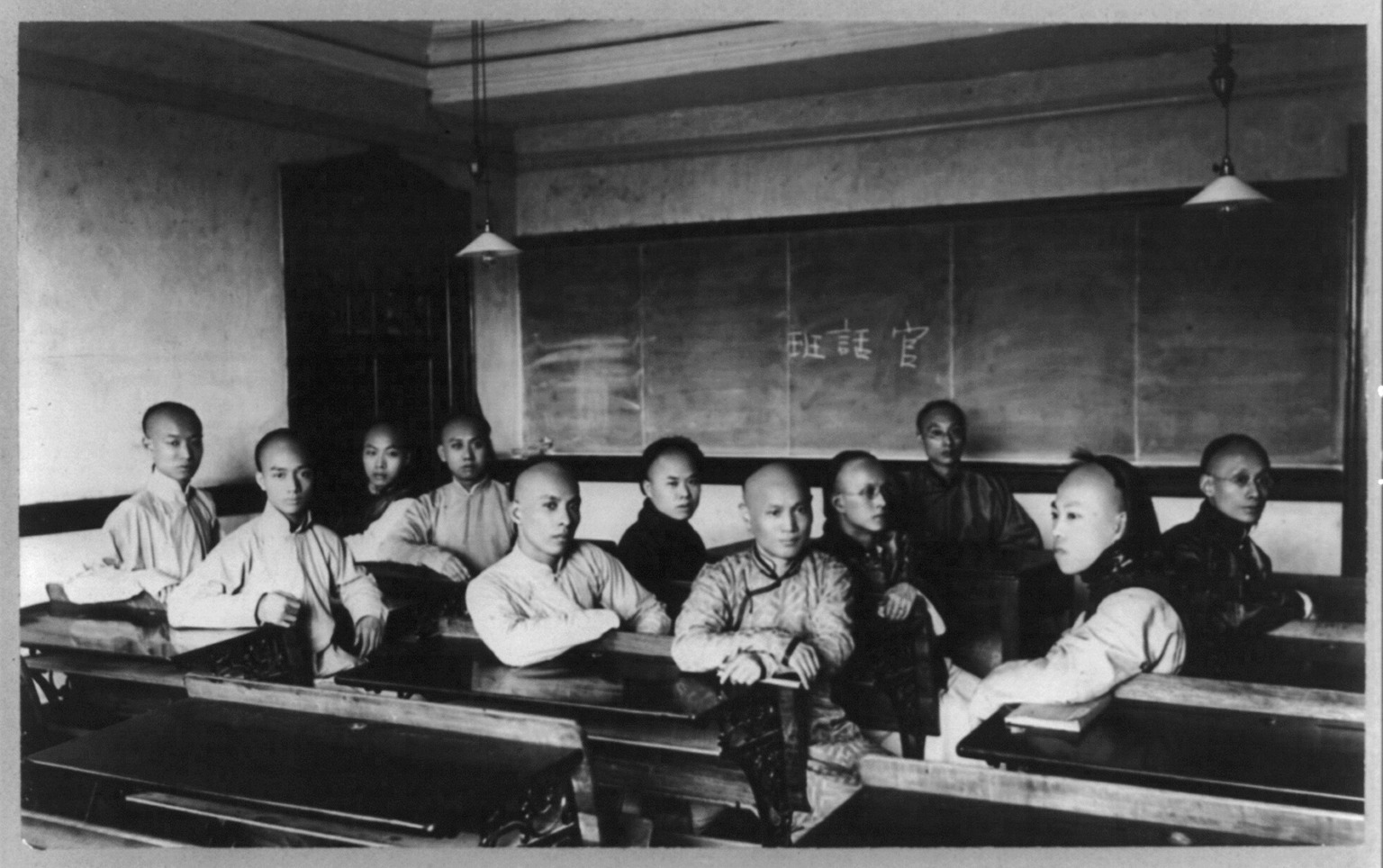
Mandarin class, c. 1900

Although Beijing had become the capital in 1420, its speech did not rival the prestige of the Nanjing-based standard until the middle of the Qing dynasty. As late as 1815, Robert Morrison based the first English–Chinese dictionary on the lower Yangtze koiné as the standard of the time, though he conceded that the Beijing dialect was gaining in influence. By the middle of the 19th century, the Beijing dialect had become dominant and was essential for any business with the imperial court. The new standard was described in grammars produced by Joseph Edkins (1864), Thomas Wade (1867) and Herbert Giles (1873).

In the early 20th century, reformers decided that China needed a national language. The traditional written form, Literary Chinese, was replaced with written vernacular Chinese, which drew its vocabulary and grammar from a range of Northern dialects (now known as Mandarin dialects). After unsuccessful attempts to define a cross-dialectal spoken standard, it was realized that a single spoken form must be selected. The only realistic candidate was the Beijing-based guānhuà, which was adapted and developed into modern Standard Chinese, which is also often called Mandarin.

== Phonology ==
The initials of Sin Sukchu's standard readings (mid-15th century) differed from those of Late Middle Chinese only in the merger of two series of retroflexes:

Initials of the standard readings
		Labial	Dental	Sibilant	Retroflex	Velar	Glottal
Stop or affricate	voiceless	p	t	ts	tʂ	k	ʔ
Stop or affricate	aspirate	pʰ	tʰ	tsʰ	tʂʰ	kʰ	
Stop or affricate	voiced	b	d	dz	dʐ	ɡ	
Nasal		m	n			ŋ	
Fricative	voiceless	f		s	ʂ	x	
Fricative	voiced	v		z	ʐ	ɣ	
Approximant		ʋ	l		r		∅

Sin's system had fewer finals than Late Middle Chinese. In particular, final stops -p, -t and -k had all merged as a final glottal stop, as found in modern Jiang-Huai Mandarin:

Finals of the standard readings
z̩, r̩							r̩ʔ	
i		iw	im	in	iŋ		iʔ	
u	uj			un	uŋ	ujŋ	uʔ	ujʔ
y				yn	juŋ	jujŋ	yʔ	yjʔ
		əw	əm	ən		əjŋ	əʔ	əjʔ
		jəw						
ɔ				ɔn			ɔʔ	
je	jej	jew	jem	jen			jeʔ	
wɔ				wɔn			wɔʔ	
ɥe				ɥen			ɥeʔ	
a	aj	aw	am	an	aŋ		aʔ	awʔ
ja	jaj	jaw	jam	jan	jaŋ		jaʔ	jawʔ
wa	waj			wan	waŋ		waʔ	wawʔ

The system had the mid vowels [e] and [ɔ], which have merged with the open vowel [a] in the modern standard language. For example, 官 and 關 are both guān in the modern language but were distinguished as [kwɔn] and [kwan] in Sin's system. The Middle Chinese level tone had split into two registers conditioned by voicing of the initial, as in modern Mandarin dialects.

In comparison with Sin's standard readings, the major changes in the late Ming language that were described by European missionaries were the loss of the voiced initials and the merger of [-m] finals with [-n]. The initials [ʋ-] and [r-] had become voiced fricatives [v-] and [ʐ-] respectively. [ʔ-] had merged into [ŋ-] before mid and low vowels, and both initials had disappeared before high vowels. By the early 18th century, the mid-vowel [e]/[ɔ] had merged with [a]. However unlike the contemporary Beijing pronunciation, in the early 19th century, Mandarin still distinguished between palatalized velars and dental affricates, the source of the spellings "Peking" and "Tientsin" for what are now "Beijing" and "Tianjin."

== Vocabulary ==
Most of the vocabulary found in descriptions of Mandarin speech before the mid-19th century has been retained by the modern standard language. However several words that appear in the more broadly-based written vernacular of the Qing and earlier periods are absent from early accounts of standard speech. These include such now-common words as hē 喝 'to drink', hěn 很 'very', suǒyǒude 所有的 'all, whatsoever' and zánmen 咱們 'we (inclusive)'. In other cases a northern form of a word displaced a southern form in the second half of 19th century, as in dōu 都 'all' (formerly dū) and hái 還 'still, yet' (formerly huán).
