= Soviet deportations of Chinese people =

Ethnic cleansing in the Soviet Union

During the 1920s and 1930s, the Soviet government forcibly transferred thousands of Chinese nationals and ethnic Chinese citizens from the USSR to Almaty, Kazakhstan (where some 4,000 remained and were kept as they were native speakers and were useful to the USSR working in translation and Soviet publishing houses). Meanwhile, the remainder (some 14,000 or more) were sent out of the country (USSR) to China. A number of memoirists (such as Israel Emiot's short chapter "With the Chinese Prisoners") mention the tight organization of the Chinese in the Soviet Gulag system. Many had landed in the Soviet forced labor camps (Gulag) accidentally. Some were the "Soviet" ethnic Chinese who were born in the USSR. While others were legal guest workers (laborers with visas to work in the USSR) or the unfortunate few who had accidentally crossed over the Chinese–Soviet border in the Russian Far East and the Zabaikal regions. Most of the deportees were deported to the Chinese province of Xinjiang and Soviet-controlled Central Asia. Although there were more than 70,000 Chinese living in the Russian Far East in 1926, the Chinese had become almost extinct in the region by the 1940s. To date, the detailed history of the removal of the Chinese diaspora in the Russian Far East requires more research and more articles to be written. The Chinese archives and the Russian/Soviet "off-limits" archives with materials on sensitive subject matters (such as politically sensitive topics between China and Russia and the INO, NKVD missions utilizing East Asians in Soviet intelligence) need to be opened for scholars to peruse. To date, there are eight major research articles on the Soviet Chinese deportation of 1937-1939. Two are newspaper articles written with data from the archives. The eight articles are: Karin-Irene Eiermann's "The Fate of the Chinese Population in Soviet Russia (2007)," GuangMing Yin's "A Historical Study of the Soviet Union's Handling of the Chinese Issue in the Far East (2016)," This is Yin's research paper translated in English. Ablazhey and Potapova's "Repressive Policy as a Tool of Resolving the 'Chinese Issue,' ", Vladimir Baturov's "The Repression of the Chinese in Stalin's Soviet Union," E.G Kalkaev's "The Place of Repression against the Chinese in the 'National' Operations of the NKVD," and Jon K. Chang's "Battling for Equality (2025)." The remaining two articles on the Chinese deportation were written by Elena N. Chernolutskaia.

The two articles by Chernolutskaia are written with very distinct and opposing views towards the Soviet Chinese. The first, "Russians and Chinese, Brothers Forever?" was written in 1993 in the period right after the collapse of the USSR during a period of deep-soul searching about the nature of repression in the USSR and the proclamation of independence and autonomy for all of the "nations" ("nations" in Russian refers to "peoples") of the former USSR. The 1993 article is very sympathetic to the suffering and repeated violations of human rights (and the 1936 Soviet Constitution) that occurred during the Sov. Chinese deportation. The second article is chapter 3 from Chernolutskaia's Forced Migration in the Russian Far East, 1920-1950. It depicts the Chinese as absolutely non-Soviet, unassimilated and a vector for opium abuse (use, distribution and proliferation) and espionage (through Japan). The tropes and depictions that this and other Soviet academic literatures, archival reports, and newspaper accounts produced strongly exhibit various forms of Soviet racism and essentialized race. Essentialized racial tropes were important in carrying out ethnic cleansing because the deleterious traits of the targeted people would not change. Hence, deportation was the only solution.

Often considered strangers to Soviet society, the Chinese were more prone to political repression, due to their lack of exposure to propaganda machines and their unwillingness to bear the hardship of socialist transformation. From 1926 to 1937, at least 12,000 Chinese were deported from the Russian Far East to the Chinese province of Xinjiang, around 5,500 Chinese settled down in Soviet-controlled Central Asia, and 3,932 were killed. In the meantime, at least 1,000 Chinese were jailed in forced penal labour camps in Komi and Arkhangelsk near the Arctic. Even today, some villages in Komi are still called "Chinatown" because of the Chinese prisoners held in the 1940s and 1950s. Unlike other deported peoples, the deportation of Chinese and Koreans was carried out by the People's Commissariat for Internal Affairs (NKVD) members of their own nationalities. While Koreans, Chinese and Japanese were forced to leave the Russian Far East, the Soviet government launched the Khetagurovite Campaign to encourage single female settlers in the Far East, which unwittingly replaced part of the deported Asian populations.

The human rights group Memorial International kept the records of over 2,000 Chinese victims of Soviet political repression, yet it has been almost impossible to recognise their original Chinese names from Russian scripts. On 30 April 2017, the Last Address set up an inscribed board in memory of Wang Xi Xiang, a Chinese victim of the Great Purge, at the Moscow Office of the International Committee of the Red Cross.

== Background ==
=== Origin of Sinophobia ===
Through the Aigun Treaty of 1858 and the Peking Treaty of 1860, Russia acquired the lands north of the Amur and east of the Ussuri from China, since which Russia began to colonise the lands. It became urgent for Russia to integrate the acquired lands after it was defeated by Japan in 1905, as the lands became a potential target of Japanese expansionism. Lack of manpower in the Russian Far East due to insufficient domestic migration, along with Chinese policies to colonise its Northeastern borders with Russia, led to an influx of Chinese labourers in the region.

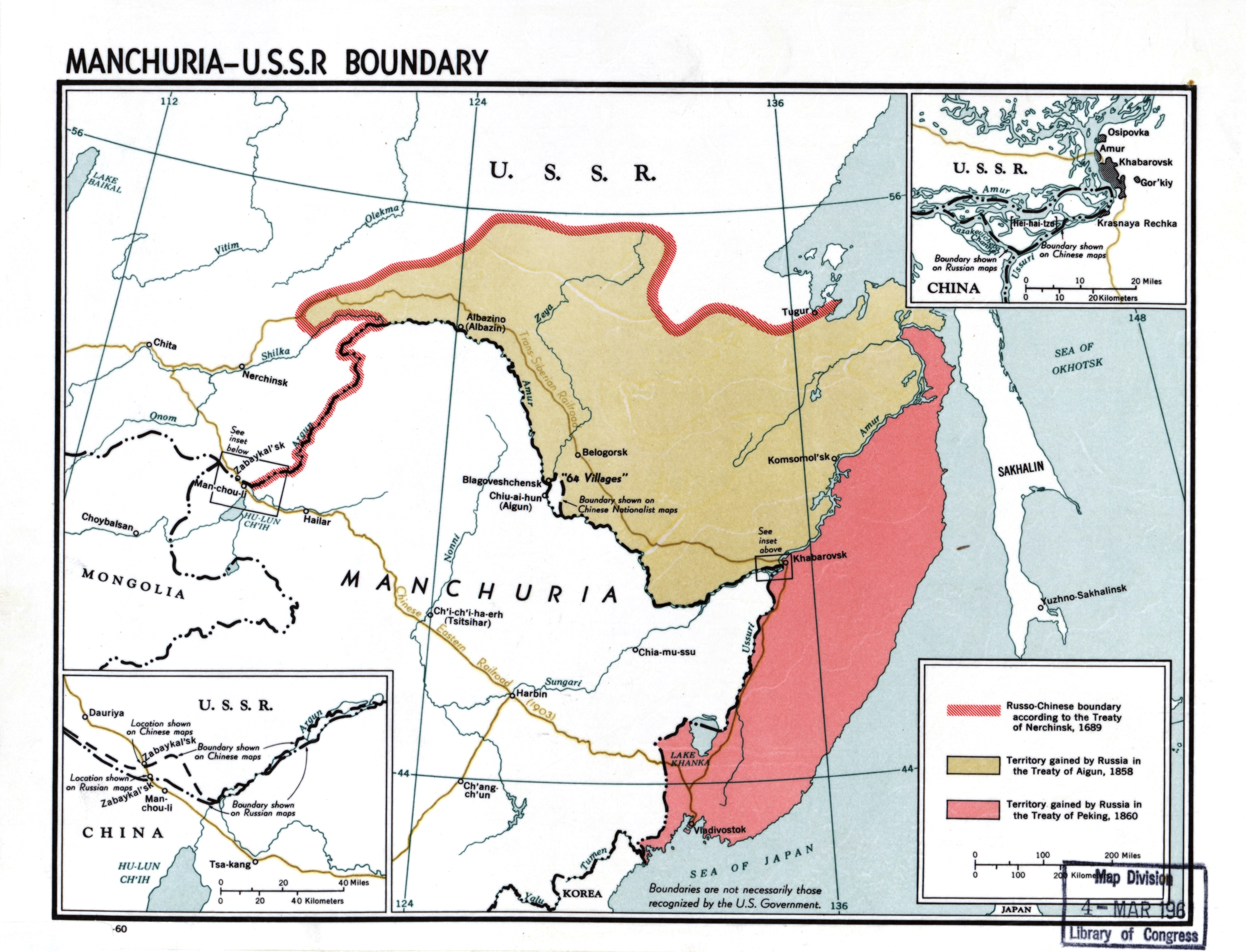
Changes in the Russo-Chinese border in the 17-19th centuries

However, the growing Chinese population and trade with China led to a mounting concern within the Russian government, considering that the Chinese immigration would reshape the demography of the region. As a result, the Russian government began to restrict the Chinese economic influence, especially when they realised that the local natives still regarded the Chinese as the owner of the lands, despite Russian conquest. As V. V. Grave, a Russian diplomatic who explored the region in the 1910s, put,

I have focused a little longer on [the subject of] Chinese trade among natives with the goal of giving a clear presentation of the damage from an economic and political viewpoint and finally from a moral one. Their exploitation of them and their bondage leads to their extinction... finally, through the economic dependence of the natives, the Chinese strengthen their political influence. In fact, it makes them the rulers while belittling the Russian authorities, which [whose authority] is absolutely illusory. It is necessary to fight against Chinese trade and industry in the region, which has been recognised by the Russian local administration for quite some time.

In the meantime, Chinese diasporas in Russia formed their own communities that circumvented Russian authorities and practised Chinese customs, where crimes also emerged. Compared with Russian workers, the Chinese labourers were cheaper, more obedient and more efficient, which made them popular in the Russian business sector. Meanwhile, these qualities also led to a growing concern in the Russian society and government, in which the Chinese were considered a threat to the Russian nation. The Yellow Peril was a popular term to refer to this threat in the late 19th century and early 20th century. Even though they were born in Russian soils, ethnic Chinese in Russia, like other diaspora peoples, were still more often considered to be loyal to their ancestral homelands. As described by Fridtjof Nansen in 1914,

The Chinese and Koreans are industrious and steady workers, which is not always the case with the Russians here. Then there is the fact already alluded to, that the yellow men are clever craftsmen... That a Chinese businessman is everywhere the successful rival of a Russian or a European is well known. And these qualities, as the Russian writer Bolkhovitinov puts it, are more dangerous than either the Chinese army or navy.

=== Anti-Chinese campaigns ===
In 1900, the military governor of the Amur region, Konstantin Nikolaevich Gribskii, ordered to expel the entire Chinese population in the region. His army surrounded more than 3,000 Chinese near Blagoveshchensk and forced them into the Amur River, among which only a few hundred survived. In 1911, Russia again deported thousands of Chinese from the Far East in the name of epidemic control, which received criticism within the Russian government and industry, due to the important role of the Chinese in the local economy. In 1913, although some of the members of the Khabarovsk congress again identified Chinese labourers as a major threat to the borders of Russia, the authority refused to take any extreme actions against the Chinese, due to the indispensable role of the Chinese in the local commercial activity, but rather hoped to attract more European immigrants to the Russian Far East. During the First World War, as the Russian Army High Command claimed that Germany recruited Chinese spies from Manchuria, several thousand Chinese traders were deported from all areas under military rule in 1914. Meanwhile, the Chinese were also banned from entering the empire, despite the Chinese government's neutral stance over the war.

The attempt to stop Chinese immigration was soon interrupted as the world war caused a severe manpower shortage in Russia. With the restrictions on Chinese migrants lifted, the Russian government began proactively introducing massive Chinese to work in Russia in 1915. As a result, the government recruited some 400,000 Chinese workers working in all parts of Russia. However, they suffered from the subsequent civil war in Russia, as they became discriminated against and repressed by multiple parties of the war. For example, the Japanese-backed Semyonov and Kalmykov regimes specifically targeted Chinese businesspeople, rather than their Korean counterparts, for robbery. According to Chinese diplomatic documents, the White Army executed the Chinese they captured and displayed their bodies in public as an act of intimidation. Chinese males were often rounded up and summarily executed. The Red Army was arguably even worse. Undisciplined Red Army soldiers looted and burned ethnic Chinese villages, raped women, killed random Chinese, imprisoned and tortured males of military age and interned women and children. Many junior officers of the Red Army regarded anyone who could not speak Russian as potential spies or foreign agents. Besides, the Allied army randomly searched the belongings of the Chinese workers. They would regard the workers as communists if they thought anything was suspicious and kill them without interrogation. Eventually, among the Chinese workers in Russia, around 50,000 joined the Soviet Red Army, whilst most of the rest returned to China with the help of the Chinese government, the Chinese Red Cross Society and the Chinese trade union in Russia.

=== Chinese interventionism ===
According to the Aigun Treaty of 1858, the Chinese population in the former Chinese lands conceded to Russia remained Chinese subjects that had extraterritorial rights and immunities from Russian rule. Chinese diplomatic interventions to protect such rights were often successful and still valid until the Boxer Rebellion. With the formation of the Republic of China in 1912, the republican government, compared with the previous imperial government, cared more about overseas Chinese citizens and encouraged its citizens in Russia to form various self-governing groups. These groups were co-registered with the Russian and Chinese governments, with their annual reports sent to Beijing and their leaders mandated by Beijing. The Russian government only had limited knowledge regarding the groups' close ties with China. At the same time, the Chinese societies settled disputes within the Chinese community, despite Russian jurisdiction, due to the weak Russian administration in the Far East.

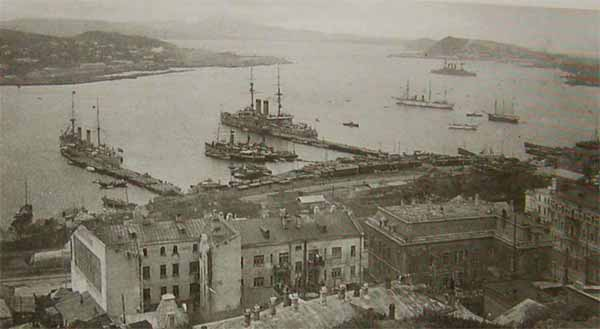
Hai Yung, a Chinese cruiser (left) and Mikasa, a Japanese battleship (right) in Vladivostok, Russia in 1918 during the Siberian Intervention.

During the Russian Civil War, while the United States and Japan sent troops to Vladivostok to protect their citizens, Chinese officials, including the Chinese Charge-D Lu Shiyuan in the city, made requests to Beijing for military protection in 1917. Thus, in April 1918, the Chinese government sent the cruiser Hai Yung from Shanghai to Vladivostok. In the following months, the Chinese government rented several passenger ships from China to evacuate its citizens in the region. In 1919, Chinese warships Chiang Hung, Li Chuan, Li Sui, and Li Chieh were further deployed, in order to protect the Chinese navigation right in the Amur. In 1920, the Yung Chien was sent to Vladivostok to replace Hai Yung. Yung Chien was also the mission's last Chinese warship, leaving Vladivostok in early 1921.

Under Soviet rule, the diplomatic representations of the Republic of China, considered a friendly country to the Soviet Union, were exempt from closing down, unlike those of other countries. As of 1938, there were 10 Chinese consular offices in the Soviet Union, among which five in Central Asia were controlled by Xinjiang local authorities but not the central government of China and the rest were in Vladivostok, Khabarovsk, Blagoveshchensk, Chita and Novosibirsk. The unique presence of the Chinese diplomatic representations was due to the Soviet support of the Chinese republic in the Sino-Japanese War. Yet, the friendly attitude did not extend to the Chinese residents in the Soviet Union. The Chinese had a negative image among the Soviets, and the Soviet government regarded them as a threat to the state due to their association with the Japanese puppet state of Manchukuo and Japan. NKVD viewed the hostility to Japanese in the communities as a result of Japanese spies' provocations to incite murders of Japanese subjects, thus providing Japan with a casus belli against the Soviet Union.

=== Evolving Soviet policies ===
After the Russian Civil War, the ruling Communist Party introduced the New Economics Policy, which soon attracted Chinese immigrants back to the Russian Far East where manpower was lacking. Although the Soviet government also migrated 66,202 from Europe to the region, the rising number of Chinese still had a tremendous impact on the local economy. By the late 1920s, the Chinese had controlled more than half of commerce places and share of trade in the Far East. 48.5% of grocery retailers, 22.1% of food, beverage and tobacco were sold by Chinese. During the time, most Chinese in Russia, as they were in the pre-revolutionary times, lived in the Russian Far East, especially in Vladivostok. According to the 1926 census, there were 43,513 Chinese living in Vladivostok, which accounted for 67% of the total Chinese population in the Far East. However, this figure could underestimate the local Chinese population, as it did not include the information regarding the seasonal workers from China. Among the local Chinese, 98% of them did not have Soviet citizenship.

At the beginning of Communist rule, the Soviet government tried to flourish the Chinese community by allowing the publication of Chinese newspapers, encouraging the establishment of Chinese trade unions and promoting literacy education among Chinese. In particular, the government tried to promote a Latinised form of Chinese among the Chinese, hoping that they would spread communist revolution back to their home country. However, in 1926, the People's Commissariat for Foreign Affairs resolved to use any means to stop Chinese and Koreans from migrating into Soviet territory, as they were regarded to cause danger to the Soviet Union. Koreans began to be relocated from the Far East, while measures were taken to "squeeze out" the Chinese from the border area. In 1928, Geitsman, a regional representative of the People's Commissariat of Foreign Affairs in Vladivostok, wrote that the Chinese economic power would undermine the political authority of the Soviet Union. He further proposed that a Korean could take the place of each deported Chinese worker, while Vladimir Arsenyev, who participated in the deportation of Chinese in the Tsarist era, submitted a report to Far Eastern Commission, advising that free migration from China and Korea in the areas bordering the countries should be stopped and that the area should be filled with migrants from Siberia and Europe instead.

Since the late 1920s, the Soviet Union tightened its control along the Sino-Soviet border with the following measures: 1) stricter security checks for entry into the Union; 2) taxing the outbound packages, whose worth should be less than 300 rubles, at a rate of 34%. When the Chinese were leaving the Soviet Union, they would need to pay an extra 14-ruble outbound fee and to be checked nakedly. Remittances of the Chinese was restricted. Extra taxation, including that of business license, business, income, profits, private debts, docks, poverty, school, etc., was assigned to the Chinese and their properties. The Chinese were forced to join the local workers' union, as a requirement of their jobs. Thus, after 1926, the Chinese population began to decrease as a result of the Soviet policy to reject foreign labourers, end private business and eliminate crimes in the region. Despite the decreased Chinese population, the Soviet government still considered the East Asians, including Chinese, Japanese and Koreans, as a major threat to the country, especially after the Japanese invasion of Manchuria in 1931 deepened Japanese threat to the Soviet Union.

== Deportation in the 1920s ==
=== Stalinist collectivisation ===
From 1928 to 1932, as the collectivisation led to significantly increased racial tension; the severe anti-Chinese and anti-Korean sentiments led to a major outflow of the Chinese and Korean population in the region. In the Russian Far East, 7,978 Chinese accounted for 37% of those who owned a property in urban areas. Among the Chinese property owners, there were 2,372 who employed at least one workers. Although most of them only ran small businesses, their properties were all confiscated by the Soviet government amid the socialist transformation. Unlike Koreans in the Soviet Union, the Chinese farmers mostly had their families in China, thus unwilling to work in the Soviet Union permanently. Thus, Soviet inclusion of them in the collectivisation led to their dissatisfaction. Meanwhile, there was a growing concern within the government, as they were unable to control local Chinese. The authority admitted that they had little information about temporary Chinese workers who came to Russia without a legal permit and returned in a similar way. They complained that the Chinese took their profits in Russia out of the country. As a result, the government refused to offer Chinese farmlands, purposely lowered the price of Chinese agricultural products, and expelled those disobedient. The collective farms run by Chinese were also a target in the Great Purge of 1933, during which leaders of several Chinese collective farms were convicted for trafficking and other crimes. Under Joseph Stalin, trafficking and smuggling were serious political crimes that was severely sectioned, yet these crimes were only convenient excuses for arrests. Many accused of the crimes never crossed the border, while deportations became a powerful legal tool to control the border region.

=== 1929 Sino-Soviet conflict ===
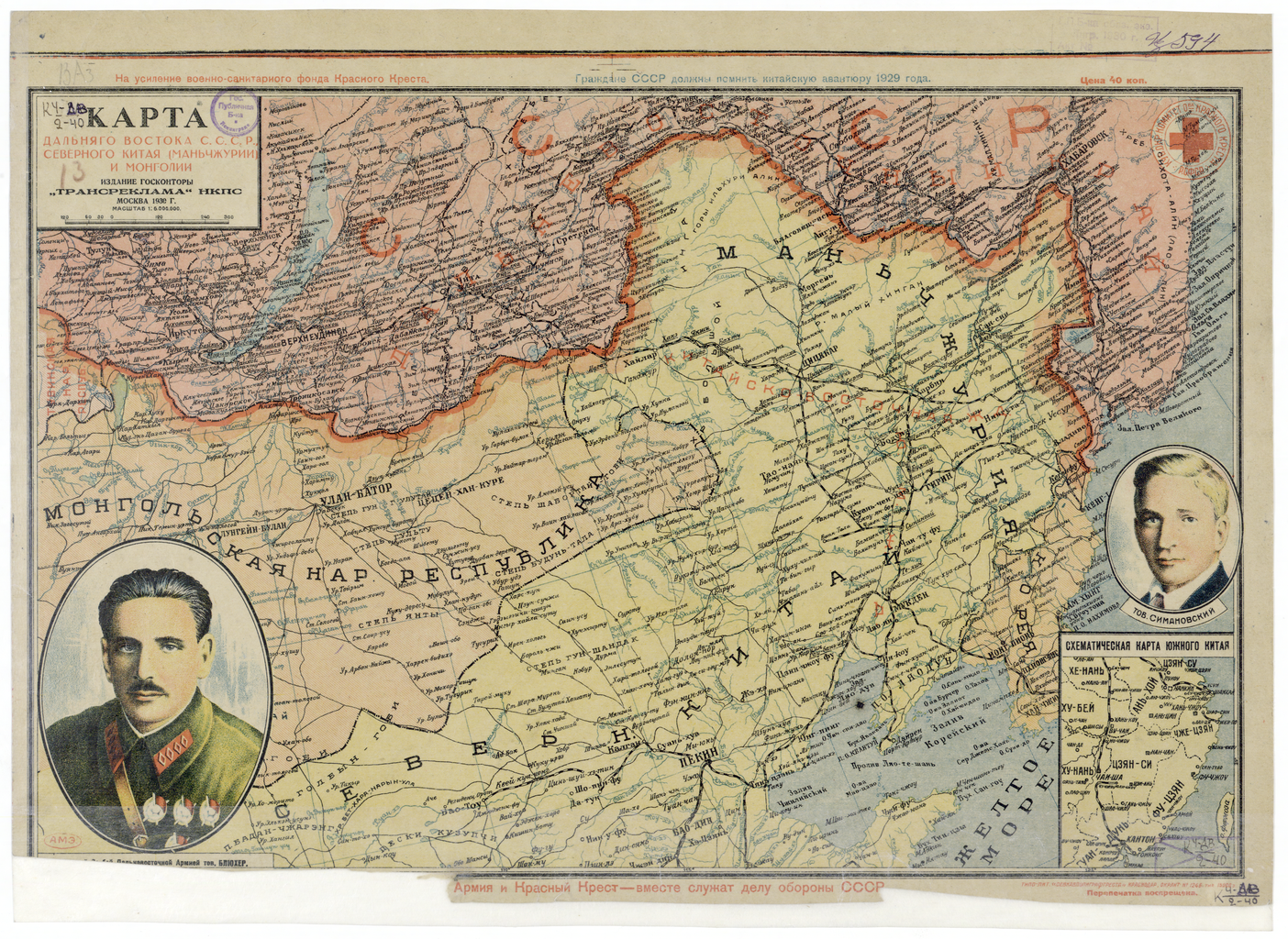
The Sino-Soviet border after the conflict

In May 1929, backed by Chiang Kai-shek's Nationalist Government, the army of the Manchurian warlord Zhang Xueliang raided the Soviet consulate in Harbin and detained Soviet citizens at the consulate, which led to Soviet retaliation by arresting Chinese citizens in the Soviet Union. The Soviet Union broke off its diplomatic relations with China on 19 July 1929, with all diplomats recalled or expelled to their home countries. The Soviet Union suspended railway communication and demanded that all Chinese diplomats leave Soviet territory. The Soviet government forced the Chinese to move to Manchuria. Thousands of Chinese in Irkutsk, Chita and Ulan-Ude were arrested due to reasons including breach of local orders and tax evasion. When they were to leave Russia, any Chinese to cross the border with more than 30 rubles in cash will need to pay the surplus to the authority. 1,000 rubles in cash to cross the border would make them arrested, with all the money confiscated.

The Chinese were detained in massive numbers according to the Shanghai-based newspaper Shen Bao. on 24 July 1929, the newspaper said, "around a thousand Chinese who lived in Vladivostok were detained by the Soviet authority. They were all said to be bourgeoisie." On 12 August, the newspaper stated that there were still 1,600-1,700 Chinese in jail in Vladivostok, and that each of them was provided with a piece of rye bread daily and underwent various tortures. On 26 August, the newspaper continued that the detained Chinese in Khabarovsk only had a bread soup for meal daily, among which a lot of people had hanged them due to unbearable starvation. On 14 September, the newspaper stated that another thousand Chinese in Vladivostok were arrested, with almost no Chinese left in the city. On 15 September, the newspaper continued that Vladivostok had arrested more than 1,000 Chinese during 8–9 September and that there were estimated to be more than 7,000 Chinese in jail in the city. On 21 September, the newspaper said, "the Government in the Russian Far East cheated the arrested Chinese, and forced them to construct the railway between Heihe and Khabarovsk. The forced workers only had two pieces of rye bread to eat daily. If they worked with any delay, they would be whipped, making them at the edge of living and dead."

Although after signing the 1929 Khabarovsk Protocol which settled the issues regarding the 1929 Sino-Soviet conflict, the Soviet Government released most arrested Chinese, considering that the Chinese had been severely tortured by the Soviet Government, that the confiscated possessions the Chinese were not returned, and difficult situations among the workers and businessmen, the high prices of goods, and the unaffordable living costs, the released Chinese all returned to China afterwards.The conflict was a turning point in people's lives across the border, which united the Soviet borderland community and turned it against the Chinese. The Soviet Government also began to stop the Chinese from crossing the border after Japan established the client state of Manchukuo in Northeast China. Many Chinese in Russia were from Manchuria; thus, Japan could possibly claim the Chinese in the Russian Far East to be subjects of its client state.

== Deportation during 1936–39 ==
=== Liquidation of Millionka ===
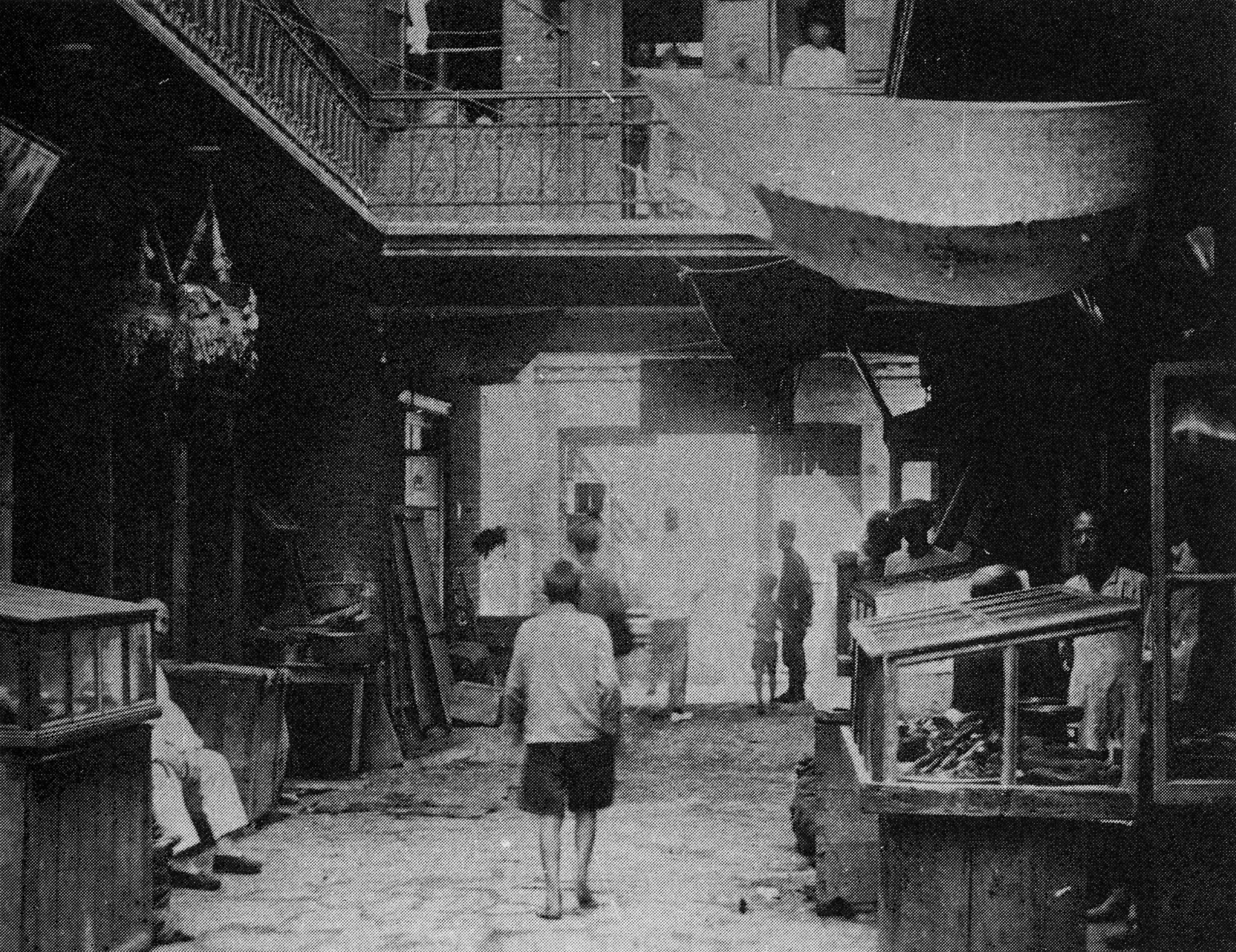
An inner yard of Millionka in the 1920s

On 17 April 1936, the Soviet Politburo resolved to liquidate Millionka, the Chinatown of Vladivostok. The operation began in May 1936, as the Primorsky Krai NKVD searched and arrested undocumented tenants, criminals and brothel keepers in Millionka, expelling all other Chinese residents from the neighbourhood and confiscating all properties that belonged to Chinese citizens. In May and June 1936, the Chinese consulates twice intervened in the Soviet crackdown in Millionka as the crackdown on crimes and illegal immigration raised panic among the local Chinese. The Central Committee of All-Union Communist Party (Bolsheviks) further discussed the liquidation of Millionka on 17 June 1936, with a draft response to Chinese diplomats approved. Considering the negative impact of the Mutual Assistance Pact between the Soviet Union and the Mongolian People's Republic, which China deemed as a separatist government, the Soviet Politburo ordered the local government to avoid leaving the impression that the operation targeted Chinese and to finish the liquidation of Millionka by the end of 1936. The municipal authority of Vladivostok also promised to provide legal Chinese residents with alternative accommodations. According to Chinese diplomatic documents, from late 1935 to early 1937, the Soviet government deported several batches of Chinese. However, with the war between China and Japan escalated in 1937, the Soviet Union resumed its massive deportation of Asian populations.

=== Arrests and deportation ===
Instructions of the People's Commissar of the NKVD N.I. Yezhov to the head of the Department of the NKVD of the Far East G.S. Lyushkov on the arrest of the Chinese

Ref. No. 52691
22 December 1937
Khabarovsk NKVD to Lyushkov

All Chinese, regardless of their nationality, showing provocative actions or terrorist intent, should be immediately arrested.

Ezhov
CA FSB of Russia. F. 3. Op. 4. D. 152. L. 227.

On 21 August 1937, the deportation of Koreans, the largest Asian group in the Russian Far East, was ordered. The actual deportation process did not begin until the middle of September 1937. On 23 October, Kharbintsy, or Harbin Russians, were further listed as a target of the purge after the Polish, the German and the Koreans, as announced by Order 693 of the NKVD. On 10 November, the Republic of China Consulate in Chita reported to the Ministry of Foreign Affairs that the Soviet was migrating 30,000 Europeans to Siberia and the Far East monthly to strengthen defence and economic construction in the region. The consulate further reported that to save space for the European migrants and to avoid Chinese or Korean collusion with Japan and Manchukuo, the Soviet government enforced the policy to remove Koreans and Chinese. However, the Chinese government did not pay much attention to this information due to the war with Japan.

On 22 December 1937, Nikolai Yezhov ordered Genrikh Lyushkov, Chair of NKVD in the Far East, to arrest all Chinese with provocation and terrorist aims without regard to their passport nationality (poddanstvo). The first ciphered telegram was sent from Ezhov (head of the NKVD) to Liushkov on 22 December, but the actual Soviet Chinese deportation began on 26 December 1937, when the state issued a formal NKVD deportation order, number 62833. NKVD Operation 62833 began in Millionka, Vladivostok, Russia. Also, the Soviet accusations of the Chinese often did not hold true. For example, there was a deaf, blind Chinese miner accused by the Soviet authority of being a spy. A Chinese business named Huang Nanbo was arrested for speaking Russian. On the following day, Yezhov published the Plan to Suppress Chinese Traitors and Spies, and ordered to remove any hiding places for the Chinese and other people, to search the places with care, and to arrest both tenants and landlords. Any anti-Soviet Chinese, Chinese spies, Chinese smugglers and Chinese criminals of Soviet nationality should be tried by a three-people group led by Lyushkov. Anti-Soviet Chinese and Chinese spies should be suppressed. Any foreigners involved in these kinds of events should be expelled after trials. Anyone found to be suspicious was prohibited from living in the Far East, Chita, and Irkutsk.

On 31 January 1938, the Soviet Politburo decided to continue its suppression of ethnic minorities and added a separate Chinese line. As a result, massive arrests of Chinese became nationwide and began to occur where massive arrests had not taken place. The Soviet government believed that the Japanese Kwantung Army trained many Russian-speaking Chinese to enter Russia for espionage. Thus, it became necessary to rule out the Chinese in the region to paralyse the Japanese intelligence in the region. The Republic of China consulates in Khabarovsk and Blagoveshchensk reported more than 200 and 100 Chinese arrested respectively. The number of arrested Chinese significantly dropped in June 1938. During 12–13 January 1938, more than 20 Chinese were reportedly arrested in Blagoveshchensk. On 21 January, dozens of those who formerly worked for the Chinese Eastern Railway were shot in Khabarovsk. All Chinese who lived in Vladivostok or lived within 60 miles of the frontier were forced to be relocated. Between August 1937 and May 1938, 11,000 Chinese were arrested and another 8,000 Chinese were deported. On 22 February 1938, the Chinese Consulate in Khabarovsk reported another hundred innocent Chinese arrested during the previous night by NKVD and that it was heard that previously arrested Chinese were forced to work in those remote, cold areas. On 2 March, the Chinese Consulate in Vladivostok reported, "the Soviet authority searched for the Chinese day and night, arresting the Chinese even when they were at work. The Soviets were so aggressive that there was no space for any concession. The deeds were as brutal as the exclusion of China in 1900, during which many were drowned in the Heilongjiang River. Recalling the miserable history makes people tremble with fear."

After times of massive arrests, there were only more than a thousand Chinese in Vladivostok. The Soviet authority stopped the search and detention for a month. After the Chinese who were sheltered by the Chinese Consulate all left the consulate, the Soviet authority restarted to search and seize the Chinese. As the Soviets had established tremendous checkpoints around the Chinese Consulate, the Chinese were unable to return to the consulate for help, which made almost all the Chinese in Vladivostok arrested. The second and third massive search-and-seizure operation arrested 2,005 and 3,082 Chinese respectively. On 7 May 1938, the Chinese Consulate in Vladivostok reported 7,000—8,000 Chinese in total under detention. The Chinese filled local prisons; the overcrowded prison, plus tortures during interrogation, often caused deaths. There were further deportations of the Soviet Chinese from September to December 1939. During this period, 181 members of mixed race Chinese families where the father was Chinese and the mother was not Russian were also sent to Kazakhstan. An additional 1030 members of Chinese families where the father was Chinese and the mother was Russian were also sent to Kazakhstan. Keep in mind that Chinese women married to non-Chinese (as long as they were not Korean) were allowed to stay in the Russian Far East. Finally, 227 former Soviet Chinese prisoners (mostly from the main prison in Khabarovsk) were also deported to Kazakhstan from Sept. to Dec. 1939.

Most of the deported Chinese arrived in Xinjiang via Kazakhstan. According to Liushkov, it was estimated that 200,000 to 250,000 were repressed in the Russian Far East from August 1937 to June 1938, which accounted for at least 8% of the local population, a proportion much higher than for the Soviet Union as a whole. The removal of Chinese and Korean communities in the region also caused an irreparable loss in agriculture, as they were the most productive cultivators of the region. These contributed to the region's inability to fulfil its goal in the five-year plan.

== Erasing East Asians from the RFE ==
Russian and Soviet historiography intentionally erased the histories and contributions of the Chinese and Koreans to the Russian Far East (abbreviated as RFE). The Russian historian, Semyon D. Anosov wrote, “In the 17th century, the Manchu-Tungus tribes living in the region were conquered by China and deported. Since then, the region has been deserted.” Kim Syn Khva, a Soviet Korean historian and author of Essays on the History of the Soviet Koreans [очерки по историй Советских корейтсев], wrote, "The first Korean migrants appeared in the southern Ussuri region when secretly 13 families came here fleeing Korea from unbearable poverty and famine." This migration occurred in 1863.

However, Chang found Western sources, most notably Ernst G. Ravenstein's The Russians on the Amur and J.M. Tronson's Personal Narrative of a Voyage to Japan, Kamtschatka, Siberia, Tartary, and Various Parts of Coast of China: In H.M.S. Barracouta, which detailed Chinese, Korean and Manchu settlements from Ternei to Vladivostok and Poset before 1863 (see small map below). Some of these Chinese and Korean settlements and settlers were remnants from the Bohai/Parhae kingdom (which ended in 926 AD). Parhae was a Korean and Manchu polity. Both Ravenstein (1856-60) and Tronson (1854-56) explored the Russian Far East before 1860. Ravenstein's account is much more accurate and full of ethnographic details. At the very least, he noticed the differences between Koreans and Chinese versus the Manchus. The former prepared and sold trepangs according to Ravenstein. They (Chinese and Koreans) also raised crops and cattle and lived in small villages and settlements among their co-ethnics. Ravenstein was a German geographer, cartographer and ethnographer of some note. Tronson's account called all of the East Asians whether Chinese, Korean, Manchu or Tungusic peoples "Mantchu-Tartars." Chang also interviewed an elderly Soviet Korean grandmother in 2008, named Soon-Ok Li. Ms. Li stated that, "No one came from Korea. We have always lived in Vondo [the Korean name for the Russian Far East]. Even my grandparents [Ms. Li was born in 1928] were born here."

Returning to the geographer, Ravenstein, he found Chinese and Korean settlements, settlers and criminals in the RFE from Ternei Bay to Poset, Russia (from 1854 to 1860). Ravenstein noted that it was the Koreans and Chinese who fished for trepangs (sea cucumbers) and then dried and salted them as an expensive delicacy to be sold in Korea, Japan and China. He did not find the Tungus nor Manchus harvesting the trepang. Ravenstein and Tronson's accounts refute the Soviet historians who maintain that the Russian Far East (previously was known as Outer Manchuria prior to 1858) was devoid of Chinese and Koreans before 1863. Chang estimates that there were ten thousand Chinese and four to five thousand Koreans in the region during the 19th century. There might have been more than this number as well. The Qing had sent many of its political prisoners and criminals to exile in Manchuria beginning in 1644. This included all of the ethnic groups in China including Koreans. Perhaps, the Han dynasties prior to the Qing did so as well.

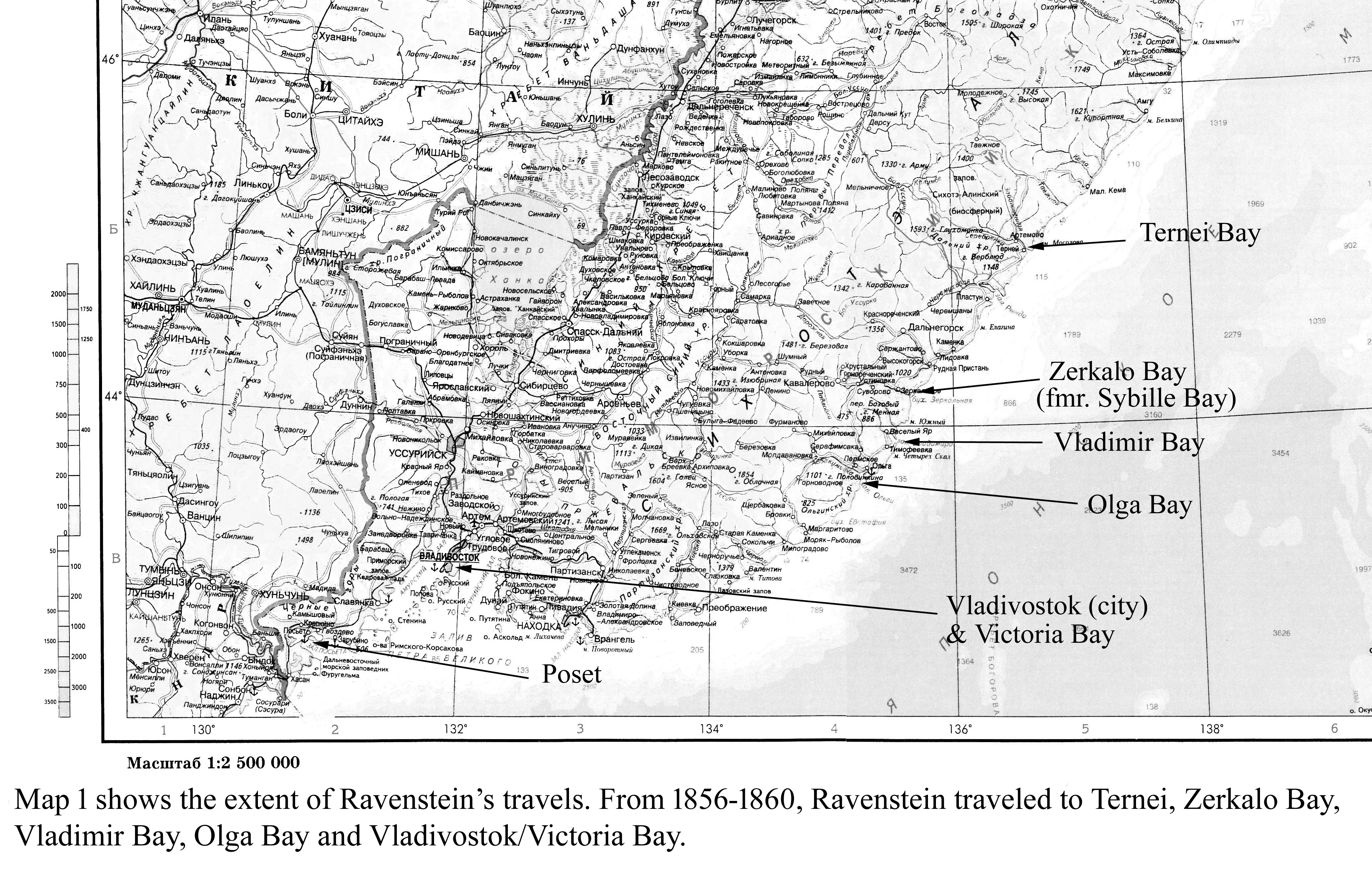
Map Presenting Ernst G. Ravenstein's Travels in the Primore from 1854 to 1860

=== Chinese reactions to deportation ===
On 10 January 1938, Yu Ming, Charge-D of the Chinese embassy in Moscow lodged representations to the Soviet Union, urging the authority to release the Chinese. The Chinese request to meet the chief officer of the Department of the Far East of People's Commissariat for Foreign Affairs on the following day was declined by the officer who claimed to be sick. On 13 January, some Chinese reported to Chinese consulates in Vladivostok and Khabarovsk that the detained Chinese were starving and even tortured to death, yet the NKDA reject any meeting or food donation by the Chinese consulates. On 28 January, the Chinese Consulate in Vladivostok reported to the Chinese Ministry of Foreign Affairs, "how could we believe that (the Soviet authority) said the Chinese all committed espionage!"

On 6 February 1938, the Soviet abuse of the Chinese hit the headline of the Central Daily News, the official newspaper of the ruling Chinese nationalists. On 14 February, the Chinese Consulate in Vladivostok reported to the Ministry of Foreign Affairs, "the Soviets robbed everything, especially money and possessions; if they were hidden somewhere, the Chinese would be extorted by torture, and numerous people were killed by such detention, which was miserable and harsh to an extreme." On 17 February, the Chinese Consulate in Khabarovsk protested against the tortures during interrogation, calling on the Soviet Union to release arrested Chinese. On 19 February, the Central Daily News again protested against the Soviet abuse of the Chinese. On 21 February, Hong Kong-based Kung Sheung Daily News re-posted a Japanese coverage of the Soviet brutality against the Chinese, expressing its outrage against the deeds of the Soviet Union.

Resolution of the Politburo of the Central Committee of the All-Union Communist Party (Bolsheviks) on the resettlement of Chinese from the Far East

41 - The NKVD issue

1. Stop the deportation of Chinese from the Far Eastern Territory, allowing only the resettlement to Xinjiang of those Chinese who express their voluntary desire to do so. The resettlement of the Chinese in Kazakhstan should be completely stopped.
2. For the Chinese who voluntarily wish to leave for Xinjiang, provide full assistance (in the sale of property, the fastest paperwork, assistance in delivery to the railway station, in exceptional cases, financial assistance, etc.)
3. Chinese who wish to travel to Xinjiang should be sent at their own expense.
4. For Chinese subjects and Soviet citizens living in the territory of the forbidden border zones and fortified areas in the event that they do not express a desire to leave for Xinjiang, resettle them outside these zones and areas on the territory of the region.
5. For all those Chinese and their families who, having been raised from places for deportation to Kazakhstan, lost their homes and do not wish to leave for Xinjiang, as well as those Chinese who have already climbed up to leave for Xinjiang or are already in trains, but want to stay in the Far East Territory, resettle them within the Far Eastern Territory, but outside the forbidden border zones and fortified areas.
6. The arrested Chinese, excluding those convicted and accused of espionage, active sabotage, terror, should be released from custody and deported to Xinjiang along with their families and property.

In the future, the mass arrests of the Chinese will be stopped. The arrests of the Chinese should be carried out if there are sufficient data incriminating them in counter-revolutionary or criminal offenses. The cases of the arrested Chinese should be referred to the relevant judicial authorities.

— AP RF. F. 3. Op. 58. D. 139. L. 106-107.

Since 18 April 1938, Wang Chonghui, Minister of Foreign Affairs of China's Nationalist Government, and Ivan Trofimovich, the Soviet Ambassador to China, held a four-day talk over the detention of the Chinese nationals in the Russian Far East. Seven conclusions were made as follows:

1. the Soviet Union is willing to pay the expenditure of relocation of the Chinese nationals to the inner land of the Union and Xinjiang, but this should be done by the Soviet local government stage by stage.
2. the Soviet Union provides the Chinese nationals with a certain duration of time, which ranges from two weeks to one month, to conclude personal issues.
3. the Soviet Union will only relocate the Chinese with the capability and willingness to work in the Soviet Union to her inland and she will provide convenience for the rest of the Chinese to return to China via Xinjiang.
4. the Soviet Union will assist the Chinese to dispose of their real estate, either for sale or for trusteeship. If there is no available trustee, the Chinese consulates can serve as the trustee, only if not massive real estates are under the trusteeship of the consulates. City authorities will send special officials to make the assistance.
5. the foreign affairs section of the city authorities should create a name list of Chinese for the relocation as is defined by Article 3; a copy of the list to state the time for relocation. The two documents should be submitted via diplomatic representations to the Chinese Consulate in Vladivostok, Khabarovsk and Blagoveshchensk for record purposes.
6. the Soviet Union allows the Soviet wives of the Chinese to move to China.
7. the Soviet Union agrees, in principle, to release arrested Chinese unless the person commits high crimes.

However, the Soviet government refused to provide any written guarantee of the conclusions, while China also did not insist on having a written guarantee, hoping to keep good relations with the Soviet Union during the war with Japan. Meanwhile, without giving any evidence of crimes committed by the arrested Chinese, the Soviet officials also repeatedly told the Chinese diplomats directives as such,

We fully take into account the existing friendly relations between the Soviet Union and China and believe that resolute liquidation of these Japanese agents from among Chinese traitors has not only benefited the Soviet Union, but is also doing a favour to China, as we are thus protecting its national interests.

On 20 May 1938, the Soviet government informed the Chinese embassy of the new policy regarding the deportation of Chinese. While the Chinese diplomats were negotiating with the Soviet government about the sales of Chinese-owned properties, the first batch of 1,379 Chinese departed from Vladivostok to Ayagoz, Kazakh SSR, where they would be further transferred to Xinjiang. Although the Soviet policy claimed to transport voluntary Chinese, the deportation was still forcible. On 3 June 1938, Nikolai Yezhov issued an order to Genrikh Lyushkov. According to the order,

1. Chinese people without Chinese or Soviet IDs were required to obtain Chinese passports from Chinese consulates.
2. Soviet wives of Chinese males should renounce their Soviet nationality if they went to Xinjiang.
3. Chinese wives of Chinese males with valid Soviet IDs should be deported to Kazakh SSR with their husbands.
4. If the Soviet wife of a Chinese male was of a deported nationality, the deportation to China would not be allowed.
5. The destination station of Chinese deportees was Ayagoz, where they would need to travel to Xinjiang via the Bakhty checkpoint.
6. The departing station of the deportation would be further notified by Stanislav Redens.
7. The expenses of the first batch of the deportation would be paid from the current balance, yet further special funds would be prepared within a few day.

On 10 June 1938, the Soviet Politburo passed the resolution on the relocation of the Chinese in the Far East, which stopped compelling Chinese in the Russian Far East. The details of the policy for implementation were sent from Nikolai Yezhov to Genrikh Lyushkov on the following day. From mid-June to the end of 1938, the deportation continued. Thus, there were few Chinese left in the region in 1939. In November 1938, the Chinese embassy made a request to the Soviet government for releasing Chinese prisoners, among which around 1,000 were released and deported to Xinjiang.

=== Destination of deportees ===
According to Soviet government records, from the end of 1937 to early 1938, thousands of Chinese were arrested by NKVD. From May to July 1938, 11,200 Chinese were deported by train, among whom 7,900 were sent to Xinjiang, 1,400 to the Kazakh SSR, and 1,900 to different parts of the Far East. From June to July 1937, four trains carrying 7,310 Chinese migrants and their families departed from Vladivostok to Xinjiang via the Kazakh SSR. Those who had obtained Soviet citizenship or did not want to return to China were carried by one train to areas within Khabarovsk Krai away from international borders. According to Chinese diplomatic documents, Xinjiang government reports and the Soviet decision to release Chinese who had committed minor offences, there were at least 12,000 Chinese who were deported from the Russian Far East to Xinjiang. The 1936 Soviet census results also suggests that there were at least 5,500 Chinese who resettled in Central Asia. In addition, according to the database of victims of state terror in the Soviet Union compiled by Memorial, there were 3,932 Chinese shot, mostly from early August to late November 1938. According to Gulag records, as of 1 January 1939, 3,179 ethnic Chinese were detained in Gulags, among whom 1,794 were Chinese nationals. On 1 January 1942, the number of ethnic Chinese detained in forced labour camps reached 5,192.

== Legacy ==
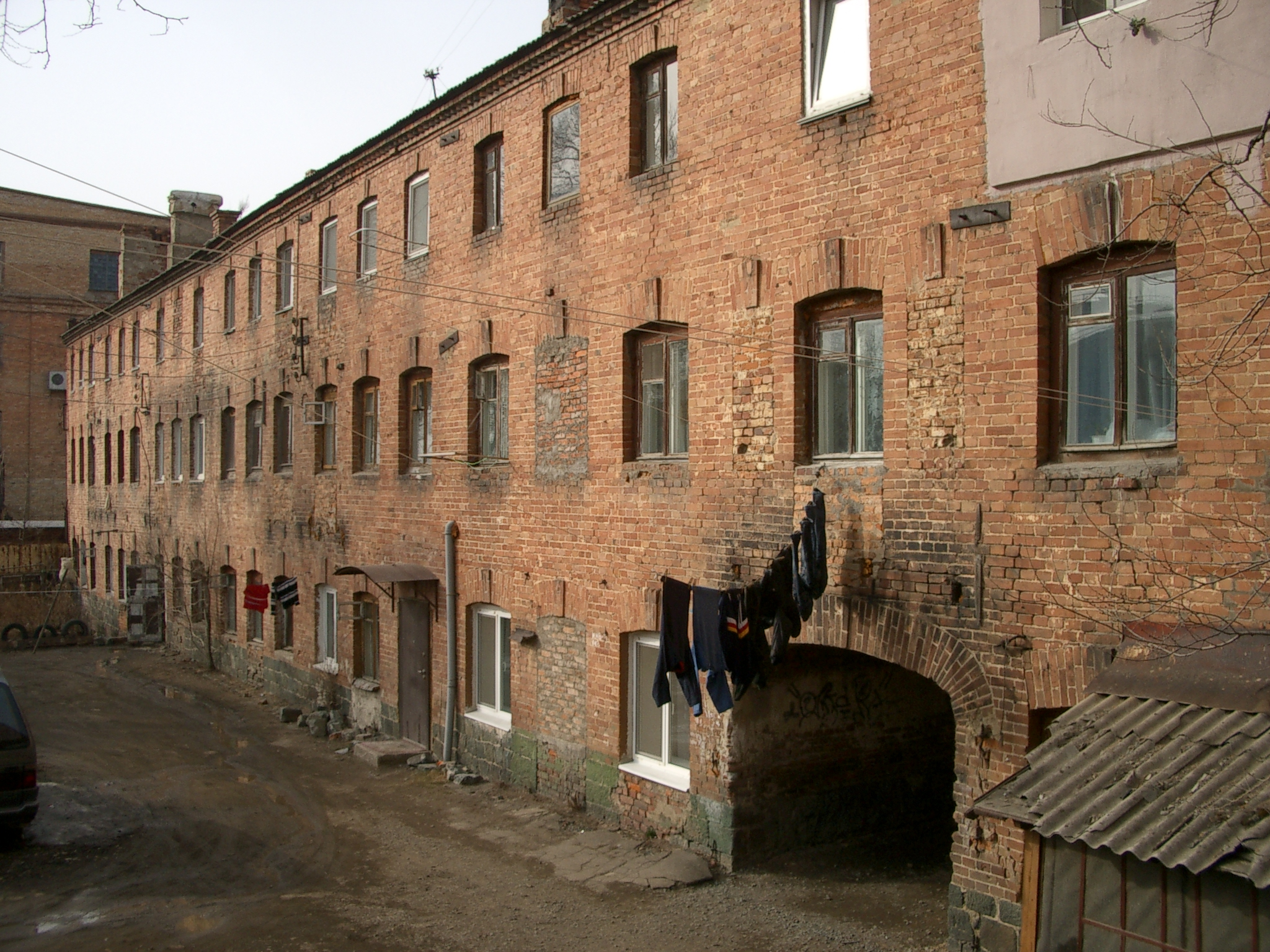
House of Lee Qi Zeen in former Millionka, Vladivostok.

After the deportation, Millionka became a ghost town. Shop signs were pulled down. Bordellos and all the other businesses had gone. There was no sign that the Chinese had lived in the neighbourhood. For half a century, only Soviet citizens lived in Vladivostok, until the collapse of the Soviet Union in 1991. As the Chinese labourers and merchants came back to the city since 1992, they were again faced with the old Stalinist suspicions of outsiders and racial tension. On 8 June 2010, corpses of Chinese people, suspected to be victims of the Great Purge, were re-discovered in Millionka. In recent years, the neighbourhood was branded as Vladivostok's "Arbat" by the local tourist authorities, where there are upscale restaurants and boutique hotels, although there is no mention of the history of the old Chinatown.

Today, some villages in Komi are called "Chinatown" because of the Chinese prisoners held during the 1940s and 1950s.

== Memorials ==
The human rights group Memorial International kept the records of over 2,000 Chinese victims of Soviet political repression, yet it has been almost impossible to recognise their original Chinese names from Russian scripts. On 30 April 2017, the Last Address set up an inscribed board in memorial of Wang Xi Xiang, a Chinese victim of the Great Purge in the Moscow Office of the International Committee of the Red Cross.

== See also ==
- Anti-Chinese sentiment, Yellow Peril and Ethnic Chinese in Russia
- 1900 Amur anti-Chinese pogroms
- Deportation of Koreans in the Soviet Union
