= Millionka =

Ethnic Chinese enclaves in Vladivostok, Russia from 1890s to 1930s

Millionka Миллионка (Russian) 百萬街/百萬莊 (Chinese)
- Urban
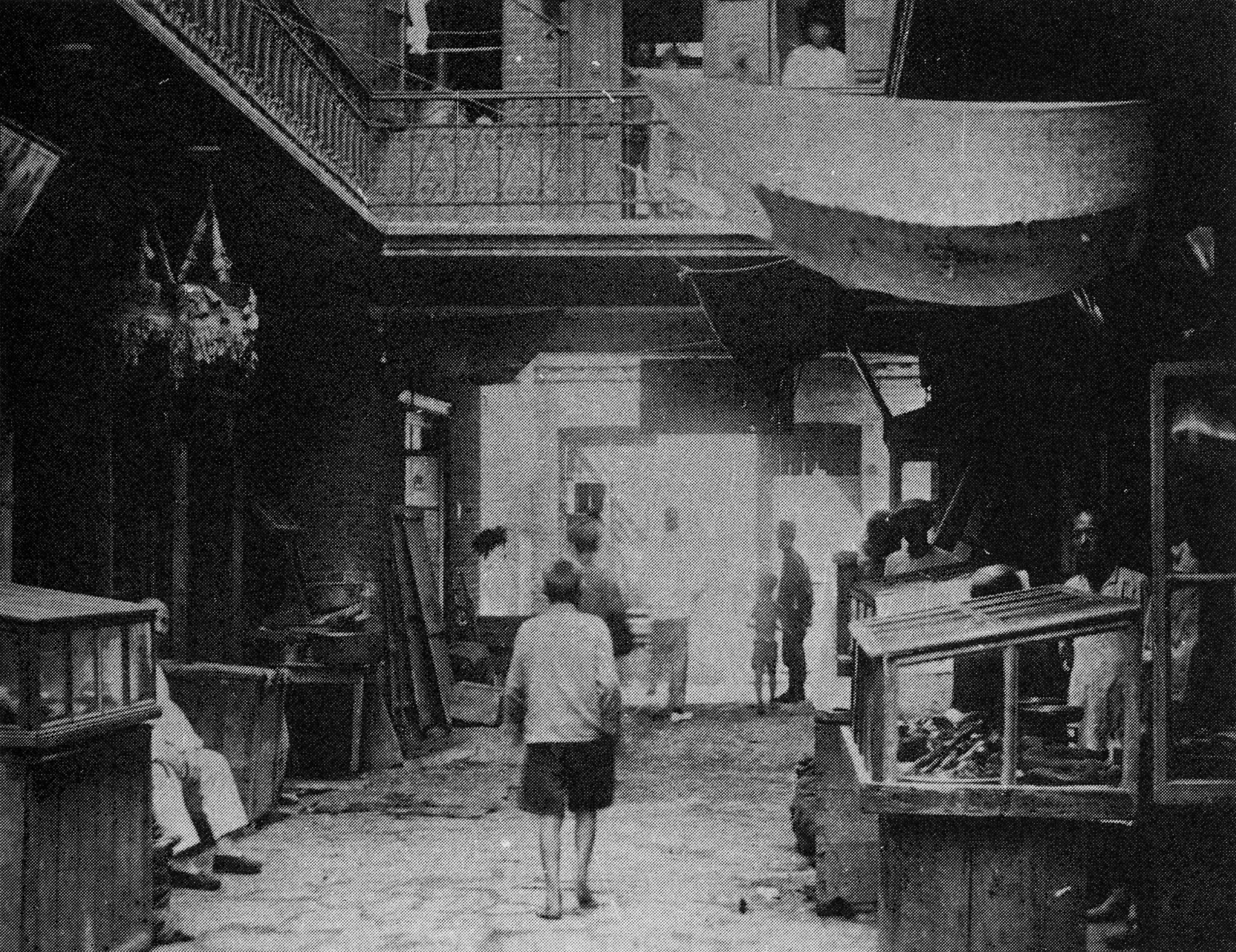
- Millionka in the 1920s

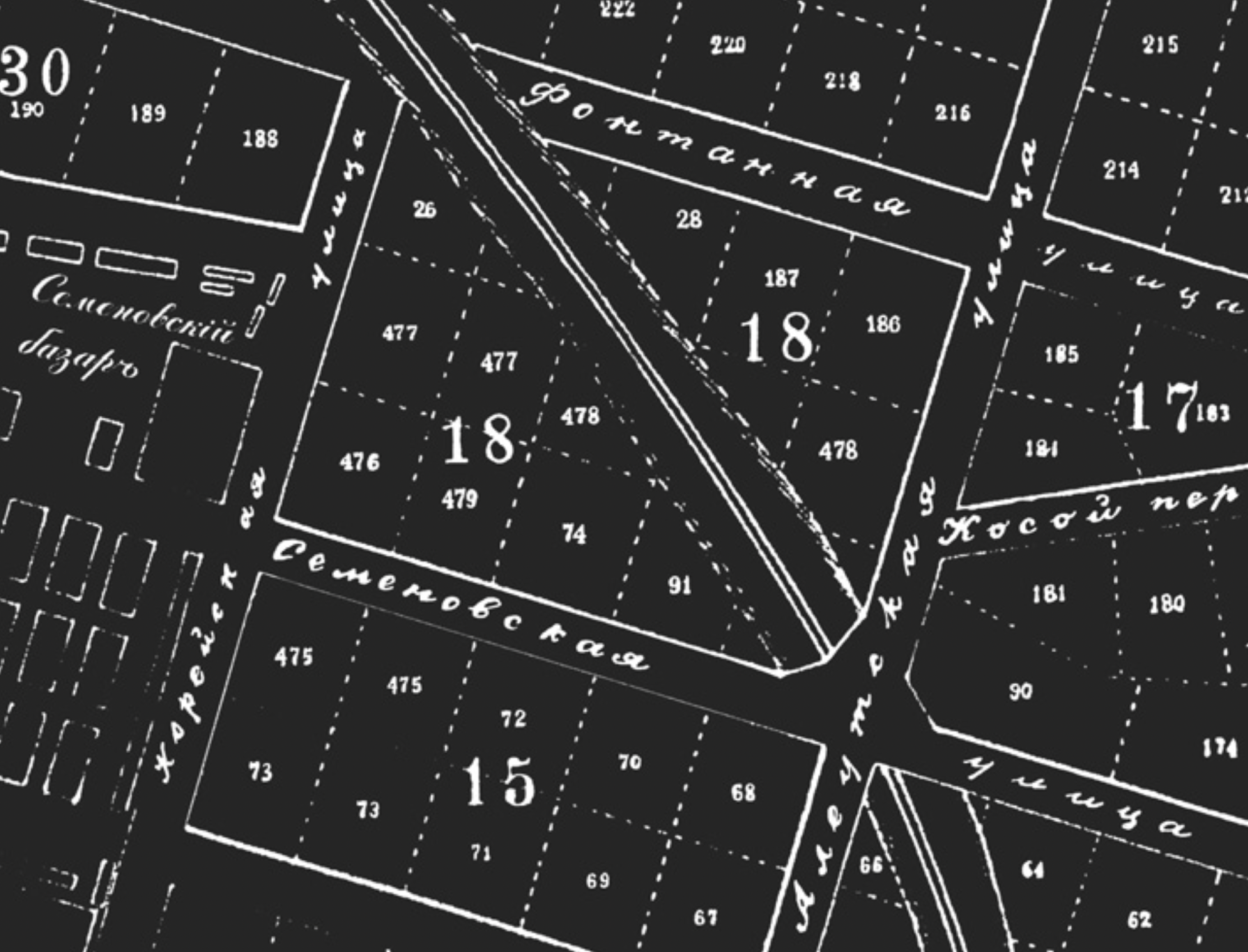
- Millionka was located in District 18 of Vladivostok
- Coordinates: 43.1178°N 131.8811°E
- Construction: Late 1880s
- Liquidation and closure: 1936-1938

Population
  - Estimate (1910): 50,000

Millionka was the old Chinese quarter of Vladivostok, Russia. Located north of the city's railway station and next to the port of Vladivostok, Millionka was a neighbourhood densely occupied by three-story buildings with secret courtyards. Once known as Vladivostok's Chinatown, the neighbourhood accommodated up to 50,000 Chinese residents, until Joseph Stalin demanded the neighbourhood be cleared in 1936. Today, as a major cultural heritage site of the city, it is being transformed into the centre of fashion and cafe life in Vladivostok.

== History ==
=== Early Chinese settlement ===
Before the Russian colonisation of the Far East, the Chinese had established a frontier garrison, known as Haisenwai. The Manchu people, who ruled China during the Qing dynasty, claimed much of the region as their ancestral homeland, until the land was conceded to Russia in 1860. The first Russian settlement of the city was established in 1860 by Tsarist soldiers, after which the region soon developed into a city, which had a large number of Chinese.

In 1884, the population of Chinese in Vladivostok reached 3,909. The city council made up a plan to evict the Chinese and Koreans to a specialised Chinese-Korean settlement, or "Kitaysko-Koreyskaya slobodka", near Kuperovskaya Pad. In 1892, the plan was approved by the Governor-General of the Primorskaya Oblast P. F. Unterberger, yet most Chinese in the city refused follow the order to move. In these early years, the Chinese lived scattered across the city. Although the city tried to introduce a passport system for the Chinese on arrival, the local police were unable to enforce the system. As the chief of police complained in 1886,

The city police are still in the dark about even the approximate number of the Chinese population in Vladivostok. It appears that the number of Chinese permanent residents reaches between 4,000 and 5,000, and of those who arrive seasonally up to 6,000. Where they come from, where they want to go and why is unknown to anyone and the very numbers are based on hearsay.

=== Failed relocation ===
On 11 September 1899 (O.S. 29 August 1899), the military governor of Khabarovsk province, Nikolai Chichagov, enacted a decree legalising the decision of the city council regarding the Chinese quarter. The evicted Chinese sent an appeal to the Senate against this decision. The latter consulted the Ministry of Internal Affairs, which recognised the right of towns to evict Chinese to special quarters no other than with the Emperor's permission. The Governor-General of Priamursk, Nikolai Grodekov, presented to the Emperor a justification containing resolutions of the city authorities and reports of the highest officials of the governor-general's office. On 12 October 1902 (O.S. 29 September 1902), Nicholas II granted the right to city councils of the Far East to restrict the residence of Asiatic nationalities in special districts. On this basis were issued acts of municipal authorities which provided for creation of the Chinese quarter for Vladivostok in 1906. The decision to relocate Chinese to a special Chinese settlement near Kuperovskaya Pad was opposed by Vladivostok fortress' commandant, who claimed that the foreigners might spy on military objects near the region.

=== Formation of Millionka ===
In 1897, as the number of Vladivostok Chinese amounted to 5,580 people, the Chinese population gravitated to Semenovsky Kovsh, or the modern-day Sportivnaya Gavan', where there was a Chinese market named Semenovskii Bazaar, also the city's second Chinese market. The residential houses for rent to the Chinese were constructed in the late 1890s, by either Russian landowners or Chinese merchants who leased the land. From then on, there soon formed an unofficial Chinese residential area to the east of the market. By the end of the 1910s, the majority of Vladivostok Chinese lived in quarters bordered by Semenovsky Bazaar and Amur Bay's shore to the west, by Svetlanskaya street to the south, by Aleutskaya street to the east and by the line stretching from the city abattoir (near modern sports complex Olimpiysky) along Lately Street (present-day Utkinskaya) to the north. This part of Vladivostok was known as large and small Millionka. Up until 1910, there were over 50,000 Chinese living in the Chinese quarter. As G. A. Sukhachova puts,

"Millionka" grew together with the city... At the beginning of 1893, the number of (the Han) Chinese immigrants increased at a rate of 10,000-11,000 people annually. In 1910-1911, there were 50,000 inhabitants in "Millionka", of whom one third were unregistered illegal immigrants. And over 40,000 had no permanent address. (Many of them) were from Manchuria, Shandong, etc.

=== Chinese life in Vladivostok ===
From the late 1890s to early 1920s, half of the city's population were Asian, while the Chinese were the largest Asian group. 83.3% of the Chinese in the city were male, in a sharp contrast with the roughly gender balanced Korean and Japanese populations in the city. Many of the Chinese in Millionka only lived there for a short while for a seasonal work. The neighbourhood had its own small shops, theatres, opium dens, brothels, and hideouts for smugglers and thieves. The city's economy was heavily dependent on the services provided by the Chinese merchants and businessmen in the neighbourhood. Specifically, the retail services of the city were controlled by the Chinese, as they had more retail shops than Russians did.

The whole neighbourhood was extremely overcrowded and had poor ventilation and low levels of hygiene, which often caused local health authority to condemn the situation of the Chinese quarter in the city centre. For example, in Semenovskaia Street. House No. 5 alone, there were 59 apartments with 300 to 350 tenants. The actual number of people living in the neighbourhood could double the official figure. After a cholera outbreak in 1890, the local government described "the extreme overcrowding and the impossible sanitary situation" in the Chinese quarter. The Chinese in the city were described as a threat to public health:

"[T]housands of exhausted, dirty, poorly-dressed sons of China have flooded Vladivostok … and seized all the trade and occupations … The cleanliness of your premises and luxury of your clothes will not save you from cholera. You will be infected by this terrible guest through back passages, through kitchen lice, through the cheap cooks, nannies, and lackeys.

Although the local Russian government frequently attempted to expel the Chinese from the city and to limit the activities of the Chinese, such attempts were in vain, as the Chinese remained beyond the reach of the city's official and legal establishment. After the Bolsheviks took over the city in 1922, the new government considered the Chinese to be "aliens harmful from the political point of view." As the Soviet government banned free commercial enterprises in 1929, many Chinese left the city. The Soviet officials often described the neighbourhood as a hub for narcotics trafficking, opium dens, and prostitution networks, considering the area to be unsanitary, dangerous, and a massive fire hazard, which were then used as an excuse to deport the Chinese residents.

=== Liquidation and closure ===
On 17 April 1936, the Soviet Politburo resolved to liquidate Millionka. The operation began in May 1936, as the Primorsky Krai NKVD searched and arrested undocumented tenants, criminals and brothel keepers in Millionka, expelling all other Chinese residents from the neighbourhood and confiscating all properties that belonged to Chinese citizens. In May and June 1936, the Chinese consulates twice intervened in the Soviet crackdown in Millionka as the crackdown on crimes and illegal immigration raised panic among the local Chinese. The Central Committee of All-Union Communist Party (Bolsheviks) further discussed the liquidation of Millionka on 17 June 1936, with a draft response to Chinese diplomats approved. Considering the negative impact of the Mutual Assistance Pact between the Soviet Union and the Mongolian People's Republic, which China deemed as a separatist government, the Soviet Politburo ordered the local government to avoid leaving the impression that the operation targeted Chinese and to finish the liquidation of Millionka by the end of 1936. The municipal authority of Vladivostok also promised to provide legal Chinese residents with alternative accommodations. According to Chinese diplomatic documents, from late 1935 to early 1937, the Soviet government deported several batches of Chinese. However, with the war between China and Japan escalated in 1937, the Soviet Union resumed its massive deportation of Asian populations. By the end of 1930s, there was no Chinese left in Millionka. According to Solzhenitsyn, there were 63,000 Chinese being sent to forced labour camps where they died.

== Legacy ==
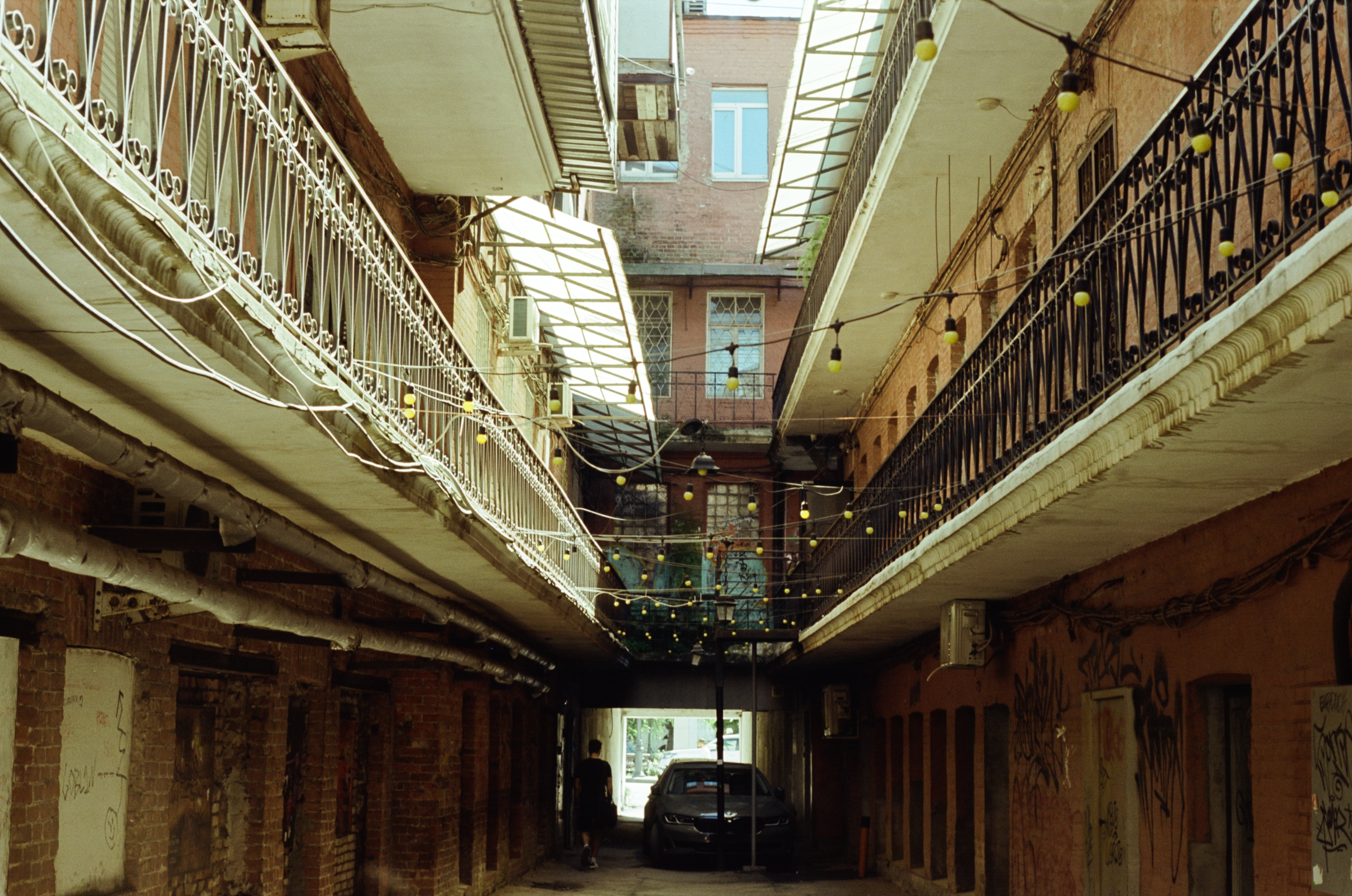
One of Millionka yards, Admirala Fokina street, 5

After the deportation, Millionka became a ghost town. Shop signs were pulled down. Bordellos and all the other businesses had gone. There was no sign that the Chinese had lived in the neighbourhood. For half a century, only Soviet citizens lived in Vladivostok, until the collapse of the Soviet Union in 1991. On 8 June 2010, corpses of Chinese people, suspected to be victims of the Great Purge, were re-discovered in Millionka. In recent years, the neighbourhood was branded as Vladivostok's "Arbat" by the local tourist authorities, where there are upscale restaurants and boutique hotels, although there is no mention of the history of the old Chinatown.

== In popular culture ==
- 1966 – Millionka appears in its former guise in No Password Necessary, a movie based on the novel of the same name by Julian Semyonov.
- 1969 – a number of episodes of the TV series Bonivur's Heart take place in Millionka.
- 1977 – Valentin Pikul in his novel Richness compares Millionka with Khitrovsky market of pre-revolutionary Moscow.
- 2006 – A free newspaper Millionka started to be distributed in Vladivostok.
- 2008 – Alexander Tokovenko published a historical novel named Vladivostok's Millionka.
- 2010 – Artist Pavel Shugurov and a group of 33+1 studio created 7 concrete bas-reliefs Residents of Millionka in the city centre.
- One of the first organisations of FC Luch Vladivostok fans is called Millionka.

== See also ==
- Ethnic Chinese in Russia
- Deportation of Chinese in the Soviet Union
