= Dragunov (surname) =

Dragunov, feminine: Dragunova (Russian: Драгунов (m); Драгунова (f)), a Russian surname.

Notable people with the surname include:

== Persons ==
- Alexander Dragunov, Soviet philologist
- Ilja Dragunov, Russian-German professional wrestler
- Yevgeny Dragunov, Soviet weapons designer who created the Dragunov Sniper Rifle
- Yevhen Drahunov, Ukrainian soccer player

== Fictional characters ==
- Sergei Dragunov, a character in the Tekken franchise
- Dragunov, a character from Scrapped Princess

== See also ==
- Dragunov (disambiguation)
