= Ethnic Chinese in Russia =

Ethnic group in Russia

Total population
- 19,644 (official census 2021)

Regions with significant populations
- Moscow, Russian Far East

Languages
- Chinese, Russian

Religion
- Buddhism, Taoism

Related ethnic groups
- Overseas Chinese, Taz people

Ethnic Chinese in Russia officially numbered 39,483 according to the 2002 census. However, this figure is contested, with the Overseas Community Affairs Council of Taiwan claiming 998,000 in 2004 and 2005, and Russian demographers generally accepting estimates in the 200,000–400,000 range as of 2004. Temporary migration and shuttle trade conducted by Chinese merchants are most prevalent in Russia's Far Eastern Federal District, but most go back and forth across the border without settling in Russia; the Chinese community in Moscow has a higher proportion of long-term residents. Their number in Russia has been shrinking since 2013.

== History ==
=== Russian Empire ===
The Manchu-led Qing dynasty of China ruled the territory of East Tartary or Outer Manchuria in what is now the Russian Far East until it was annexed by the Russian Empire in 1858–1860 through the Treaty of Aigun and the Convention of Peking. The Russian trans-Ural expansion into the area resulted in a low level of armed conflict during the 1670s and 1680s; in 1685 the two sides agreed to meet for boundary negotiations. The result was the 1689 Treaty of Nerchinsk, under which the Qing relented from their earlier claims of territory all the way up to the Lena River, in exchange for the destruction of Russian forts and settlements in the Amur River basin. However, under the 1860 Treaty of Peking, the Qing ceded even the far bank of the Amur River to Russia. They retained administrative rights over the residents of the Sixty-Four Villages East of the Heilongjiang River (though not sovereignty over the territory itself); however, Russian troops massacred Qing subjects from the territory during the Boxer Rebellion.

Small-scale migration from the mountainous county of Qingtian in Zhejiang province began as early as the mid-nineteenth century. Sporadic Qingtianese migrants were reportedly present in cities including St. Petersburg and Minsk from 1842 on, engaging in the trade of carved stone handicrafts.

The Manza War in 1868 was the first attempt by Russia to expel the Chinese from territory it controlled. Hostilities broke out around Peter the Great Gulf, in Vladivostok when the Russians tried to shut off gold mining operations and expel Chinese workers there. The Chinese resisted a Russian attempt to take Askold Island and in response, 2 Russian military stations and 3 Russian towns were attacked by the Chinese, and the Russians failed to oust the Chinese.

Large-scale migration from Qing territories to lands actually under the control of the Russian Empire did not begin until the late 19th century. From 1878 until the early 1880s, thousands of Hui people escaped from Xinjiang, Gansu, and Ningxia over the Tian Shan Mountains to Central Asia, fleeing persecution in the aftermath of the Hui Minorities' War; they became known as the Dungans.

By the 1890s, emigration from China intensified with the construction and operation of the Trans-Siberian Railway, which transformed Russia into a key overland corridor connecting Far East with Europe. Many migrants followed a northern route, sailing from Shanghai to ports such as Lüshun (Port Arthur) or Yingkou, before continuing by rail across Manchuria and Siberia toward Moscow. From there, Russia functioned as a major transit point, from which Chinese migrants dispersed to various destinations further afield, with some reaching Western Europe, including Britain. Contemporary accounts suggest that this route was relatively inexpensive and did not require passports, facilitating long-distance mobility, and an advertisement explicitly reads:

"For the Eastern traveller, a trip by the trans-Siberian railway to England is an immensely interesting route. This northern course from the East to Moscow and England is very cheap. It is not necessary to present or get your passport examined. If you are not delayed by a health inspection in Port Arthur, you can reach London in 25 days!"

In 1907, a certain migrant from Qingtian, Ji Meikai (季美楷), reportedly financed his journey to Russia through this route by selling his land and travelled with other fellow countrymen carrying carved stone products. Finding limited demand for their goods there, they then proceeded onward to Berlin, where they were able to sell their stock. Subsequent shipments of stone carvings were then sent from China to sustain their trading activities.

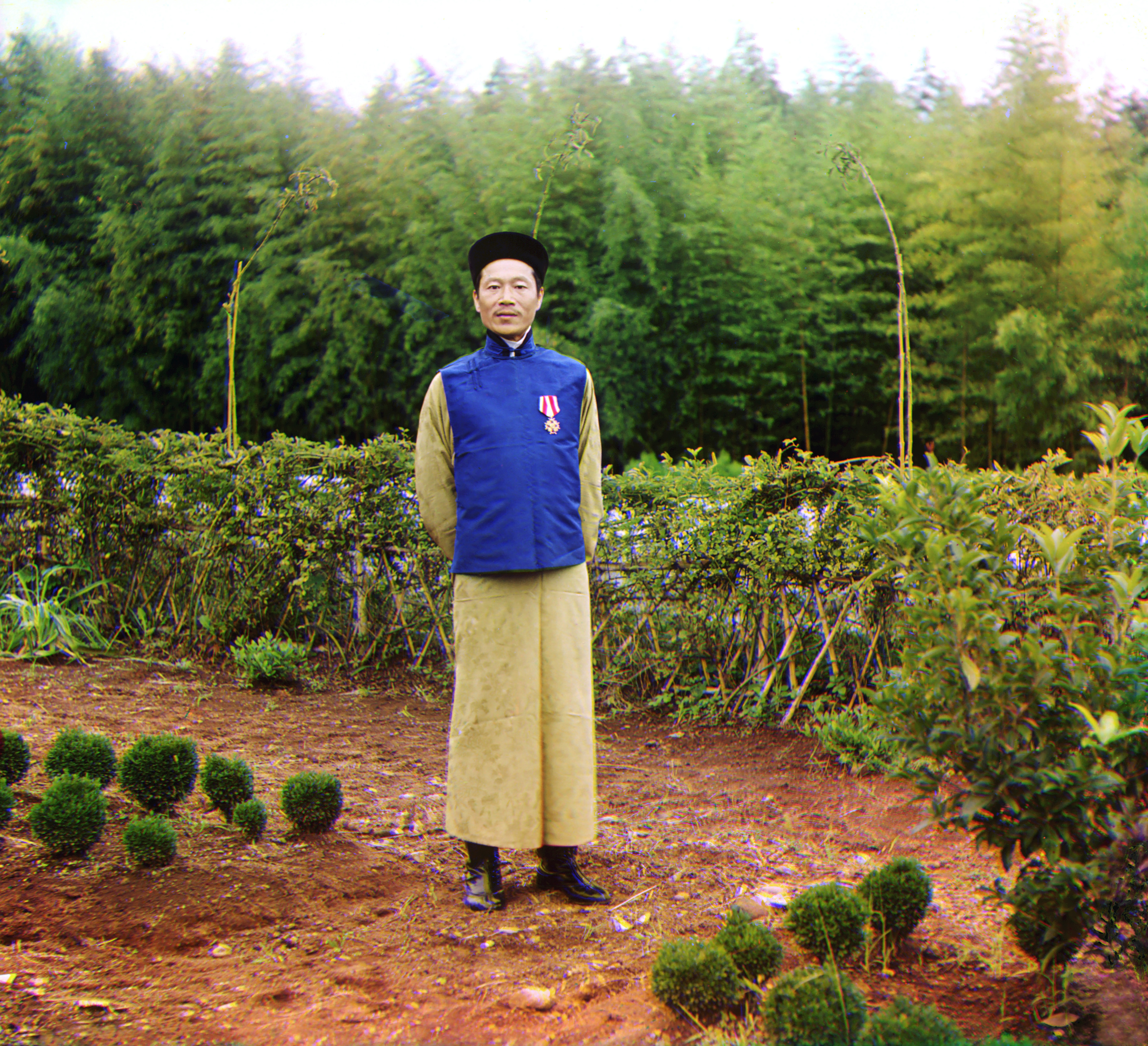
Liu Junzhou (劉峻周) of Ningbo, Zhejiang was invited to set up a tea plantation in Georgia (then part of the Russian Empire) in 1893. This photo of him was taken between 1905 and 1915 by Sergei Mikhailovich Prokudin-Gorskii.

Separately, other groups of Chinese-speaking migrants went to the Russian Far East; the Russian Empire Census of 1897 showed a total of 57,459 Chinese speakers (47,431 male and 10,028 female), of whom 42,823 (74.5%) lived in the Primorye region alone. Chinese Honghuzi bandits raided Russian settlers in the far east region during the nineteenth and twentieth centuries, in one incident, the Honghuzi attacked the Heeck family, kidnapping Fridolf Heeck's son, and killing his servant and wife in 1879.

Few of the Chinese in the Russian Empire's Far East would be able to become Russian subjects. It is reported that, at least during one period, only persons who had been married to a Russian subject and had become Christian would be eligible for naturalization. One of the most successful Chinese in late 19th century Russia, the prosperous Khabarovsk merchant Ji Fengtai (紀鳳台), better known under the Russified name Nikolay Ivanovich Tifontai, had his first naturalization petition rejected by Governor A.N. Korff in the late 1880s on the grounds of the applicant's still wearing a queue; his second application was approved in 1894, despite the applicant's Manchu hairstyle, as the authorities took into account the fact that his son, and the heir of his fortune, was born in Russia and was a baptized Christian. Later, Tifontai was to play an important part in Russia's economic expansion into Manchuria.

During World War I, several thousand of the Russian Empire's Chinese residents were brought to European Russia to work on the construction of fortifications. After the October Revolution of 1917, a large number of ethnic Chinese participated in the Russian Civil War as well.

=== Soviet Russia ===
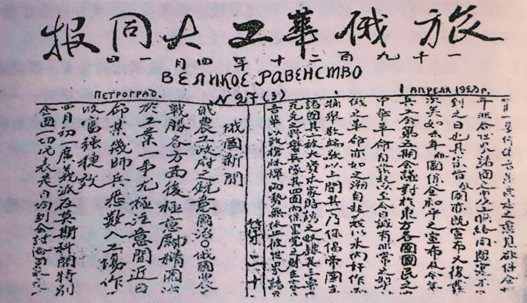
Issue No. 27 of the 'Solidarity Paper of the Chinese Workers in Russia (旅俄華工大同報),' 1 April 1920

Following the Russian Revolution, Chinese migrants in Russia began to organise collectively. In April 1917, the Association of Chinese in Russia (中華旅俄聯合會) was established in Petrograd, later reorganised in 1918 as the Association of Chinese Workers in Russia (旅俄華工聯合會). Branch organisations were also formed in Moscow.

Among its leaders was Sun Yanchuan, a migrant from Qingtian, who served as a Chinese secretary and was involved in publishing the Solidarity Newspaper of Chinese Workers in Russia (旅俄華工大同報) with the support of Soviet authorities. The newspaper, which circulated between 1918 and 1920 with an estimated print run of 2,000 to 3,000 copies, was distributed among Chinese workers, including those serving in the Red Army. These organisations also provided mutual assistance and protection to Chinese migrants. In one reported case in 1919, members of the association intervened after several Chinese migrants from Qingtian were attacked while travelling, successfully petitioning Soviet authorities to investigate the incident, which led to the prosecution and execution of those responsible.

In the First All-Union Census of the Soviet Union, conducted in 1926, 100,000 respondents declared that they held Chinese nationality or that Chinese was their primary language; three-quarters of these were in the Russian Far East. Vladivostok was 22% Chinese, and even Moscow had a community of roughly 8,000 Chinese, largely of Shandong origin, who ran laundries, bakeries, and knitwear shops, as well as engaging in streetside peddling. Outside of the cities, others engaged in mining and opium cultivation. Under the New Economic Policy, they spread out into other urban centres, including Novosibirsk and Barnaul. The wave of Chinese migration to the Soviet Union lasted as late as 1929; the border remained relatively porous even up until the mid-1930s.

Few Chinese women migrated to Russia; many Chinese men, even those who had left wives and children behind in China, married local women in the 1920s as a result, especially those women who had been widowed during the wars and upheavals of the previous decade. Their mixed-race children tended to be given Russian forenames; some retained their fathers' Chinese surnames, while others took on Russian surnames, and a large proportion also invented new surnames using their father's entire family name and given name as the new surname.

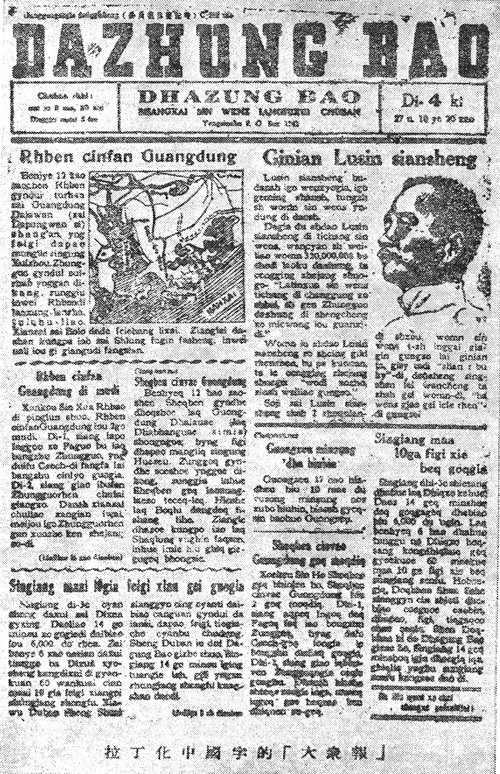
A 1930s Soviet Chinese-language newspaper in the Latinxua Sin Wenz alphabetic script

In the late 1920s and the early 1930s, the Soviet Chinese people, like most sizable ethnic groups in the early USSR, had a writing system based on the Latin alphabet developed for them; it was used to publish a number of periodicals. A separate, different, Latin-based writing system was simultaneously developed for the Dungans, who were already considered a separate ethnic group. This was accompanied by a broader campaign to raise literacy among Chinese workers, estimated at just one-third in 1923. By the 1930s, there were ten state elementary schools, one vocational secondary school, one college, and two evening schools using Chinese as their medium of instruction.

However, many Chinese migrant workers were repatriated to China in 1936. Those Chinese who remained in the Russian Far East were deported to other areas of Russia in 1937 for fear that their communities could be infiltrated by Japanese spies. Roughly 11,000 Chinese were arrested beginning that year, with 8,000 forced to resettle in the north of Russia.

Also starting from the time of Russia's 1917 October Revolution and continuing up until the 1950s-1960s Sino-Soviet split, many aspiring Chinese Communists went to study in Moscow, including Liu Shaoqi, future President of China, and Chiang Ching-kuo, the son of Chiang Kai-shek. There was a great deal of factional infighting among them. From 1950 until 1965, roughly 9,000 Chinese students went to the Soviet Union for further studies; all but a few hundred eventually returned to China, though they often faced persecution from the Anti-Rightist Movement as a result of their foreign connections.

The most recent wave of immigration traces its origin back to 1982, when Hu Yaobang visited Harbin and approved the resumption of cross-border trade; immigration remained sluggish until 1988, when China and the Soviet Union signed a visa-free tourism agreement. However, the Russian government terminated the visa-free travel agreement just six years later.

== Demography and distribution ==
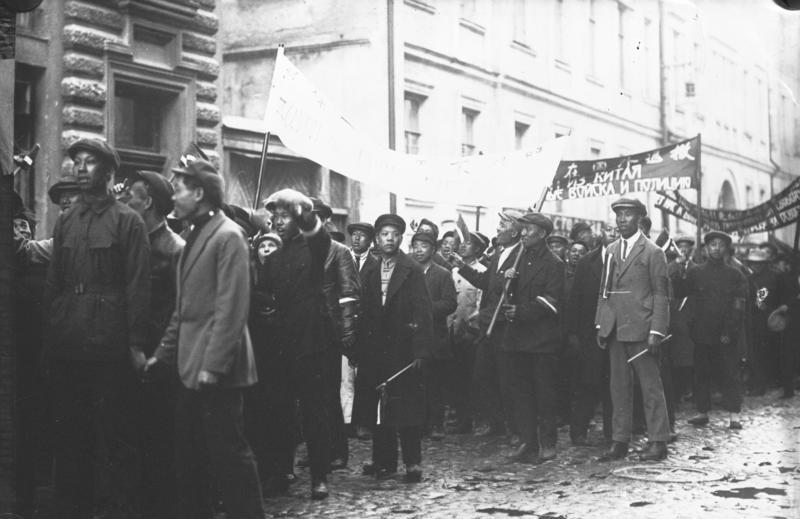
Chinese demonstration in 1932 in Moscow against Japanese aggression in China.

The total ethnic Chinese population in Russia is a somewhat controversial topic. In the 2002 Census, merely 34,500 residents of Russia (both Russian and foreign citizens) self-identified as ethnic Chinese, about half of them in Western Russia (mostly Moscow). In the opinion of many Russian demographers, the census number may be an undercount; Russian demographers consider the estimate of 200,000 to 400,000, or at the very most 500,000, as the most reliable. For example, Zhanna Zayonchkovskaya, the chief of the Population Migration Laboratory of the National Economic Forecasting Institute of Russian Academy of Sciences, estimated in 2004 the total number of Chinese present in Russia at any given point (as resident or visitors) at about 400,000 persons, much smaller than ill-educated guess of 2 million that had been given by Izvestiya. If popular media estimates such as the 2003 figure of 3.26 million were correct, Chinese would form Russia's fourth largest ethnic group after the Russians (104.1 million), Tatars (7.2 million), and Ukrainians (5.1 million).

The two main Chinese communities of Russia are those in Moscow and those in the Russian Far East. The community in Moscow was believed to have been the largest as of 2002, numbering 20,000 to 25,000 people; Chinese community leaders give even higher estimates in the 30,000 to 40,000 range. They come from most provinces of China. Moscow has the highest proportion of long-term residents (those living in Russia for more than three years), at 34%.

In the Russian Far East, the major urban centres of Chinese settlement include Khabarovsk, Vladivostok, and Ussuriysk, though in 2002, the total combined Chinese population in those three cities is less than that in Moscow. In Ussuriysk, a large proportion of the Chinese migrants working as traders are joseonjok (Chinese citizens of Korean descent); their total population there is estimated at perhaps two or three thousand people.

Most Chinese workers in the region come from the northeast of China, especially Heilongjiang, where they form an important part of the province's strategy to gain access to natural resources in Russia to fuel their own economic development. Between 1988 and 2003, 133,000 contract workers from Heilongjiang went to work in Russia; most were employed in construction and agriculture. Though some immigrants come from Jilin as well, the provincial government there is more interested in developing relations with Japan and North and South Korea. Population pressure and overcrowding on the Chinese side of the border are one motivation for emigration, while the chance to earn money doing business in Russia is described as the major pull factor. Over one hundred million people live in the three provinces of Northeast China, while across the border, the population of the 6.2 million square kilometer Far Eastern Federal District declined from roughly nine million in 1991 to seven million in 2002.

Aside from resident contract workers, 1.1 million Chinese also went to the border areas of the Russian Far East on tourist visas from 1997 to 2002. Despite the perception that many remain illegally in Russia, since 1996, over 97% of Chinese arriving on tourist visas departed on time by the same border crossing through which they entered Russia, and many of the remaining 3% either departed by other border crossings, or were arrested and deported.

== Allegations of irredentism ==
During the 1960s, when the Sino-Soviet split reached its peak and Beijing-Moscow negotiations about regularization of the border rolled on fruitlessly, Chinese civilians made frequent incursions into territory and especially waters controlled by the USSR. However, both sides' military forces refrained from the use of lethal force in asserting their border rights until a March 1969 incident in which both sides claim the other fired first. The fighting escalated into a Soviet attempt to drive the Chinese off Zhenbao Island, a then-disputed island under de facto Chinese control. On the Chinese side, 51 People's Liberation Army soldiers lost their lives; however, they retained control over the island. The Soviet government feared that the fighting marked a prelude to a large-scale Chinese incursion into the Russian Far East.

Additionally, the expanding Chinese presence in the area began to lead to yellow peril-style fears of Chinese irredentism by the Russians. Russian newspapers began to publish speculation that between two and five million Chinese migrants actually resided in the Russian Far East, and predicted that half of the population of Russia would be Chinese by 2050. Russians typically believe that Chinese come to Russia with the aim of permanent settlement, and even president Vladimir Putin was quoted as saying "If we do not take practical steps to advance the Far East soon, after a few decades, the Russian population will be speaking Chinese, Japanese, and Korean."

Some Russians perceive hostile intent in the Chinese practise of using different names for local cities, such as Hǎishēnwǎi for Vladivostok, and a widespread folk belief states that the Chinese migrants remember the exact locations of their ancestors' ginseng patches, and seek to reclaim them. The identitarian concern against the Chinese influx is described as less prevalent in the east, where most of the Chinese shuttle trade is actually occurring, than in European Russia.

== See also ==
- China–Russia relations
- Dungan people
- Japanese people in Russia
- North Koreans in Russia
- Koryo-saram
- Russians in China
- Sakhalin Koreans
- Vietnamese people in Russia
