= Dungan alphabets =

Alphabets of the Dungan language

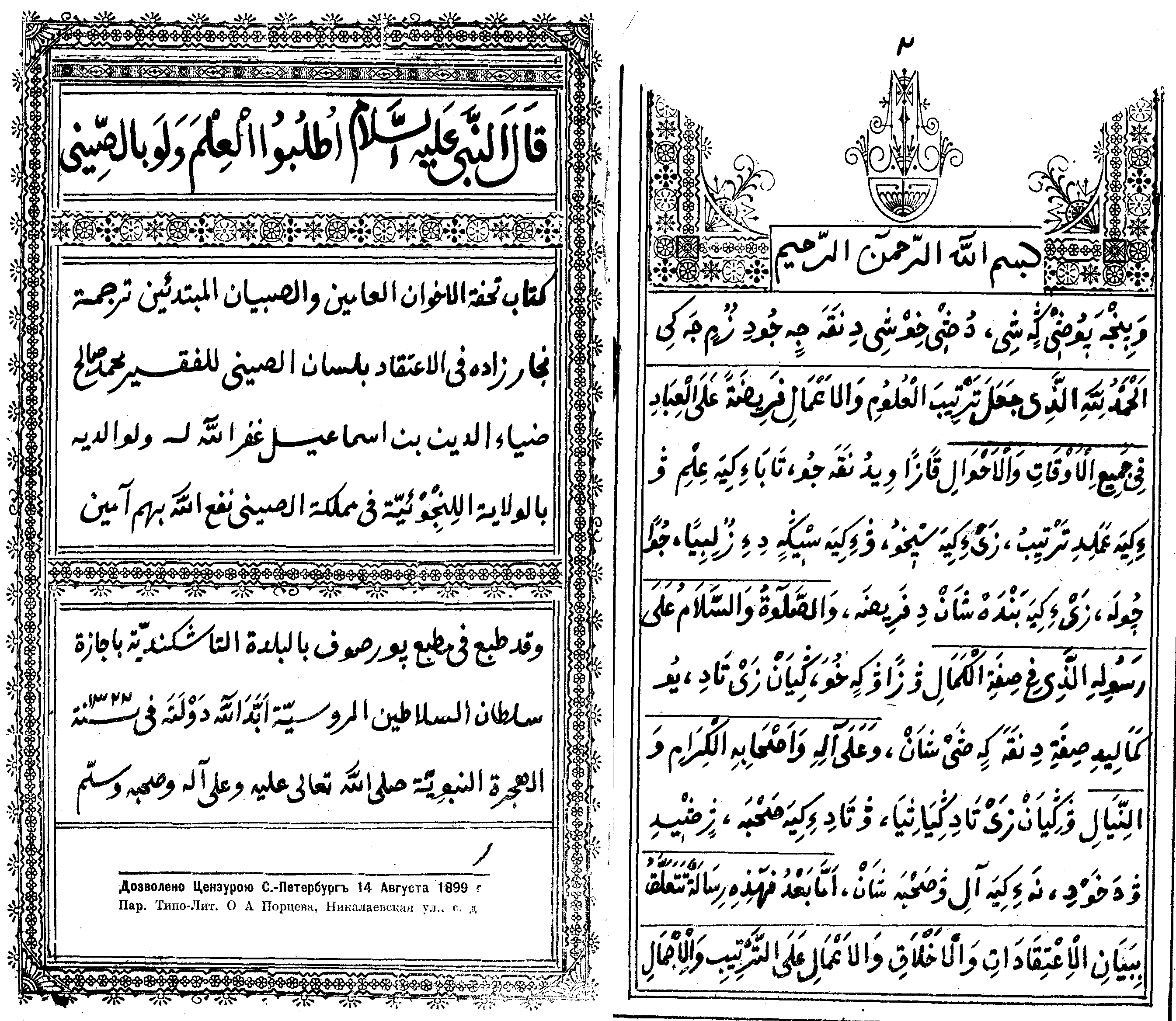
The book, printed in 1899 in Tashkent, contains the original Arabic text and a parallel translation into Chinese, written in the Xiao'erjing system.

During its existence, the character set or alphabet of the Dungan language has changed its graphic base several times and has been repeatedly reformed. Currently, the Dungan script functions in Cyrillic. Three stages are distinguished in the history of the Dungan script:

- pre-1927 – written completely in Chinese characters;
- 1927-1928 – attempts to create a writing system based on the Arabic script system Xiao'erjing, developed in China by the Hui Muslims;
- 1928-1953 – writing based on the Latin alphabet;
- since 1953 – writing based on the Cyrillic alphabet.

It is used in the territory of the former USSR, in regions where the Dungan language is widespread (mainly Kazakhstan and Kyrgyzstan).

== Chinese characters ==
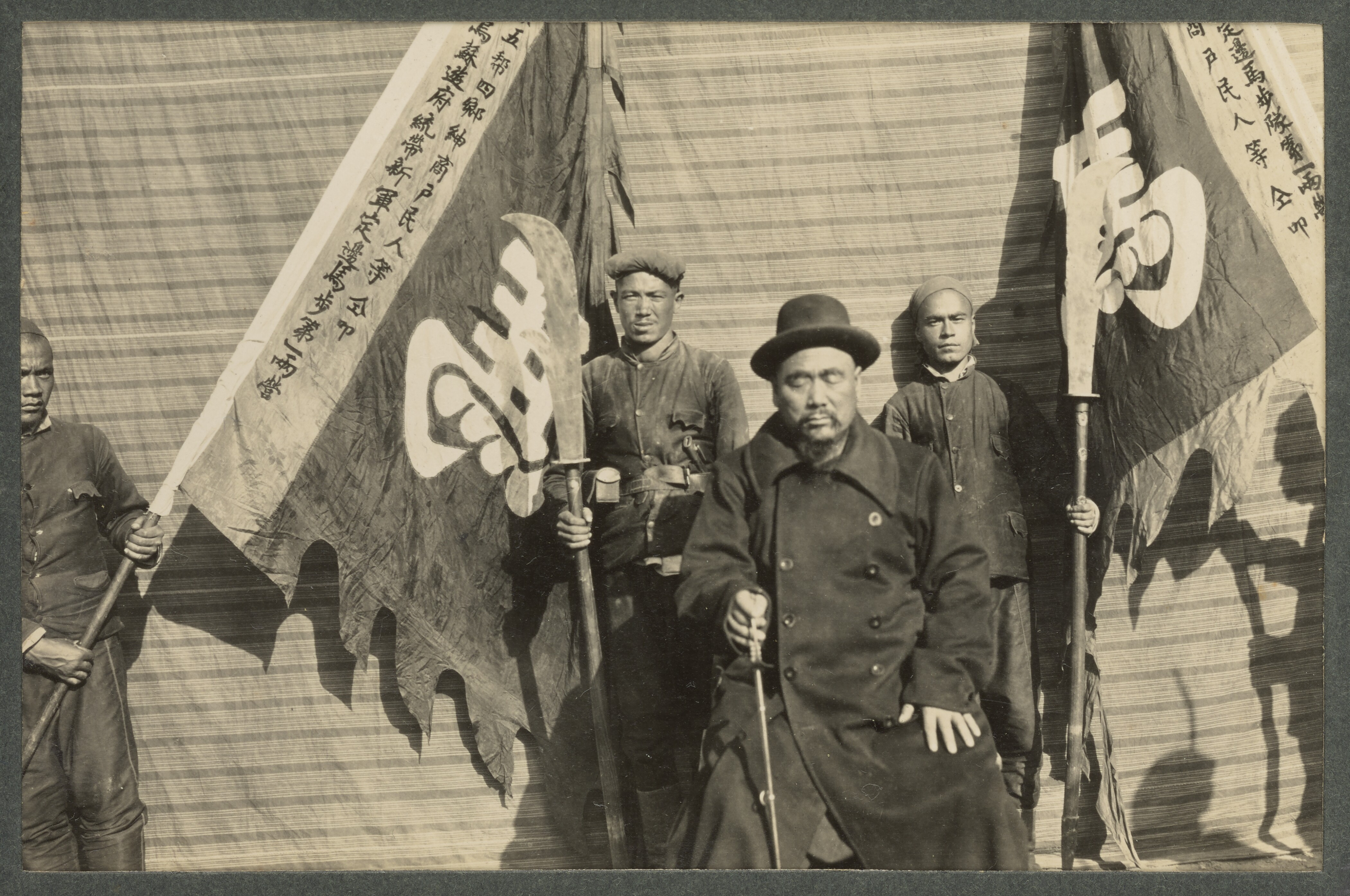
Chinese characters on the flags of a Dungan warlord.

In China, to write texts in their native Chinese language, the Hui people, whom the Dungan people directly descend from and who are occasionally also referred to as Dungans, used either Chinese characters or a modified Arabic script called Xiao'erjing. In China, the Hui people continue to use Chinese characters to write and speak their dialect of Chinese.

In 2002, Huizu yuyan bao Хуэйзў йүян бо 回族语言报 was published in Bishkek, written in Dungan Cyrillic with parallel Chinese character transcription and pinyin annotation.

Chinese researchers have published anthologies of Dungan works transcribed into Chinese characters for the interest of non-Dungan society.

In both cases, writers have struggled with transcribing vocabulary unique to Dungan.

== Arabic script ==
At the turn of the 19th and 20th centuries, the first Cyrillic records of Dungan dialects in the Russian Empire were made by V. I. Tsibuzgin, a teacher at the Russian-Dungan school in the village of Karakunuz, and his assistant, Zhebur Matsivang.

In 1928, during the Soviet era, a formalized alphabet based on the Xiao'erjing system was proposed in Tashkent by Dungan students Ya. Shivaza, Yu. Yanshansin, and H. Makeev.

This alphabet included the following letters:

ى ه ۋ و ن م ل ڭ گ ك ق ف غ ﻉ ﻅ ﻁ ڞ ﺽ ﺹ ش س ژ ز ر ﺫ د خ ﺡ چ ﺝ ث ﺕ پ ب ا

Finals of syllables were represented primarily by diacritics (followed by a vowel letter in order to provide clarification). Unlike Xiao'erjing, -n and -ng syllable codas were distinguished, and thus nunation was dropped (allowing for solutions such as doubling of diacritic or other innovations on the diacritic to be a means of representing tones).

This alphabet did not manage to gain popular use, since at that time the question of Latinization of the Dungan script was raised.

Harbsmeier questions the assertion that most Dungans were illiterate prior to Soviet campaigns. The Dungan community received Xiao'erjing letters from relatives in China into the 1950s.

== Latin ==
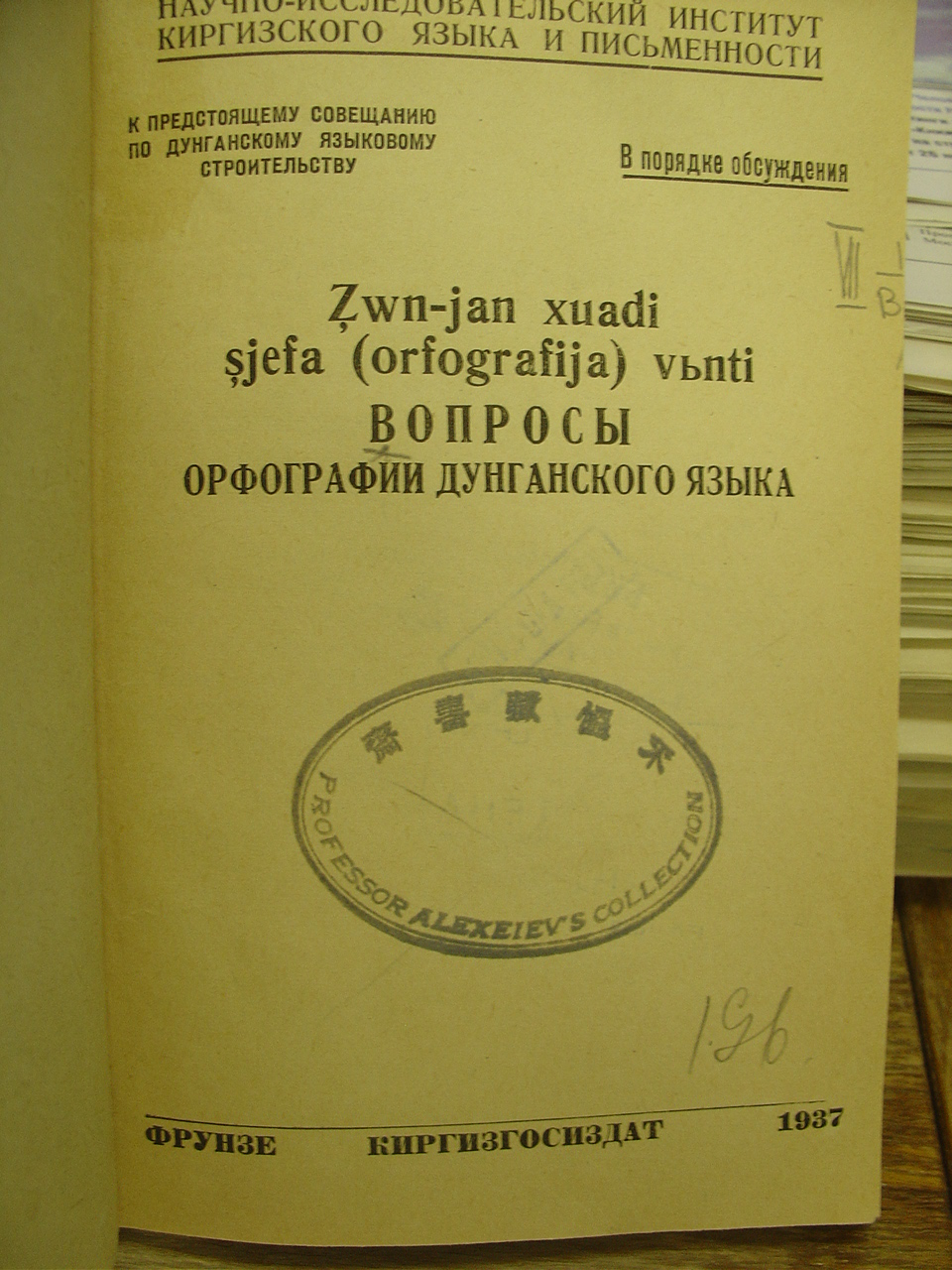
Collection of articles on Dungan phonetics and the Latin version of writing

In January 1928, at the 2nd Plenum of the All-Union Central Committee of the New Turkic Alphabet in Tashkent, the Dungan Latinized alphabet was adopted. Its authors were Ya. Zhang (Ya. Dzhon) and a group of Dungan students studying at Tashkent universities. Soviet scientists V. M. Alekseev, A. A. Dragunov and E. D. Polivanov assisted them in developing the alphabet.

The first Dungan alphabet had the following form: A a, B в, C c, Ç ç, D d, E e, F f, G g, Ƣ ƣ, H h, I i, J j, K k, L l, M m, N n, Ꞑ ꞑ, O o, Ɵ ɵ, P p, R r, S s, Ş ş, Ꟍ ꟍ, T t, U u, V v, X x, Y y, Z z, Ƶ ƶ, Ь ь. In the finally approved version of the alphabet, the letter Ꟍ ꟍ was cancelled and the letter Ә ә was introduced (however, in the first Dungan primer, capital letters were not used). The alphabet also used 4 digraphs: Dƶ dƶ, Ts ts, Tş tş, Uv uv. In March 1932, at a meeting on the Dungan alphabet, it was decided to reform it. Thus, the letters H h, Ƣ ƣ, Ɵ ɵ, as well as all digraphs, were abolished. The letters W w and Ⱬ ⱬ were introduced.

The following changes were made to the meanings of the letters: ts → c, tş → ç, dƶ → ⱬ, h → şj, c → çj, ç → ⱬj, ɵ → yә. The letter ƣ, which denoted the jagged, unrolled [r] in Dungan words, was replaced by the letter r, which had previously denoted [r] in Russian borrowings. One of the goals of the writing reform was the unification of the Dungan alphabet with the newly created Chinese Latinized alphabet. The letter j denoted the softness of the preceding consonant, but was not written before i and y. In June 1932, the conference in Frunze generally approved these changes, while retaining the letter Ƣ ƣ. Later, it was proposed to exclude from the alphabet the letter Ꞑ ꞑ, which was used in only a few words.

Dungan Latin alphabet after the reform:

A a	B в	C c	Ç ç	D d	E e	Ə ə	F f
G g	Ƣ ƣ	I i	J j	Ь ь	K k	L l	M m
N n	Ꞑ ꞑ	O o	P p	R r	S s	Ş ş	T t
U u	V v	W w	X x	Y y	Z z	Ƶ ƶ	Ⱬ ⱬ

== Cyrillic ==
The question of switching the Dungan alphabet to Cyrillic was raised shortly before the Great Patriotic War, which prevented the implementation of this project. It was revisited in 1952, when the Presidium of the USSR Academy of Sciences decided to create a commission to develop a Dungan Cyrillic alphabet. The commission was headed by A. A. Dragunov. Their projects were presented by Yu. Yanshansin, A. A. Dragunov, Yusup Tsunvazo, G. P. Serdyuchenko and A. Kalimov. Opinions were expressed about the need for a separate letter ҷ for the sound [tɕʰ], about using the letter у' instead of ў, about the uselessness of the letter ң and about replacing the native rhotic р (Latin ƣ) with э̡. At the insistence of the Dungan representatives, and overriding the objection of the linguists, Latin ş unifying the allophones [ʂ], [ɕ] was split into Cyrillic ш [ʂ] and щ [ɕ] following Russian sound values. As a result of discussions in 1953 (with some changes), the project of Yusup Yanshansin was approved. In Hashimoto's evaluation, the final Cyrillic alphabet is a transliteration of the previous Latin alphabet. This alphabet is still in use today and has the following form:

А а	Б б	В в	Г г	Д д	Е е	Ё ё	Ә ә
Ж ж	Җ җ	З з	И и	Й й	К к	Л л	М м
Н н	Ң ң	О о	П п	Р р	С с	Т т	У у
Ў ў	Ү ү	Ф ф	Х х	Ц ц	Ч ч	Ш ш	Щ щ
Ъ ъ	Ы ы	Ь ь	Э э	Ю ю	Я я

== Tones ==
Tones have never been indicated in practical writing.

When scientifically or pedagogically necessary, they are, in the traditional 3-tone analysis, designated by the Roman numerals ⟨I⟩-⟨II⟩-⟨III⟩ (җўжынҗя II-I-I owner, master). Some use superscript numbers after syllables (ми¹хуар³ chamomile). Language textbooks have used (unmarked)-⟨ъ⟩-⟨ь⟩ after the vowel. In the full 4-tone analysis, the Roman numeral system becomes ⟨Ia⟩-⟨Ib⟩-⟨II⟩-⟨III⟩-(unmarked), with tone I being split into Ia and Ib and neutral tone being unmarked instead of analyzed as I, II, or III.

A Latinized-era proposal was the usage of the diacritics ⟨ˉ⟩-⟨ˇ⟩-⟨ˆ⟩. A modern proposal by Elke Rehorn, used experimentally in children's literature, is to use the diacritics ⟨ˇ⟩-⟨ˊ⟩-⟨ˋ⟩-⟨ˉ⟩-(unmarked).

A failed proposal by Ya. Shivaza was the doubling of letters.

Sample of a sentence with marked tone

Таъ(II) ма(I) маь(III) таъ(II)ди(I)ни(I), мә(I) маь(III) вәъ(II)ди(I).
他 媽 罵 他的呢， 沒 罵 我的。
His mother is scolding him, is not scolding me.

== Correspondence chart ==
Alphabetic and phonetic table of Standard Dungan
Cyrillic order			Cyrillic		Latin		IPA		(erhua forms of vowels)			Latin order		
Alphabet #	Initial #	Final #	Cyrillic	Name	Latin	Pinyin (Du Songshou / Lin Tao)	IPA (Lin Tao)	IPA (O. Zavyalova)	Cyrillic	Latin	IPA (Lin Tao)	Alphabet #	Initial #	Final #
1		1	а	а	a	a	[a]	[a]	ар	aƣ	[ar]	1		1
2	1		б	бэ	ʙ	b	[p]	[p]				2	1	
3	2		в	вэ	v	v	[v]	[v]				25	5	
4	3		г	гэ	g	g	[k]	[k]				9	17	
5	4		д	дэ	d	d	[t]	[t]				5	6	
6		3	е	е (йэ)	ie	ie	[iə]	[ie]	ер	ieƣ	[iər]			15
7		4	ё	ё (йо)	io	iao	[iɔ]	[iɔᵘ]	ёр	ioƣ	[iɔr]			16
8		6	ә	ә (ыо)	ə	e	[ə]	[ɤ]	әр	əƣ	[ər]	7		3
9	5		ж	жэ	ƶ	r	[ʐ]	[ʐ]				30	13	
10	6		җ	җы (джы)	z̧	zh	[tʂ]	[tʂ]				31	15	
10	6		җ		(z̧i)	j	[tɕ]	[tɕ]				31	15	
11	7		з	зэ (дзэ)	z	z	[ts]	[ts]				29	12	
12		7	и	и	i	i	[i]	[i ~ ɪi]	ир	iƣ	[iər]	11		4
13	8		й	й (ий) / дуан и	j	y	[∅]	[ʝ]				12	20	
14	9		к	ка	k	k	[kʹ]	[kˣ]				13	18	
15	10		л	эл	l	l	[l]	[l]				14	9	
16	11		м	эм	m	m	[m]	[m]				15	2	
17	12		н	эн	n	n	[n]	[n]				16	8	
18	13		ң (Note: Only appears in the syllable ңә.)	эң (энг) / ын / ңә	ꞑ	ng	[ŋ]	[ŋ ~ ɣ]				17		
19		9	о	о	o	o, ao / ao	[ɔ]	[ɔ]	ор	oƣ	[ɔr]	18		5
20	14		п	пэ	p	p	[pʹ]	[pˣ]				19	3	
21			р (Note: Only appears in loanwords.)	эр	r		[r] (Note: Trilled.)	(Note: Not included.)				20		
21			р (Note: Syllable-final erhua.)	эр	ƣ	er / ∅	[r] (Note: Non-trilled.)	[ɹ]				10		
22	15		с	эс	s	s	[s]	[s]				21	11	
23	16		т	тэ	t	t	[tʹ]	[tˣ]				23	7	
24		11	у	у	u	u / ou	[ou]	[ɤu]	ур	uƣ	[our]	24		6
25		19	ў	ў (ву, ув)	w	w / u	[u]	[u]	ўр	wƣ	[ur]	26		7
26		20	ү	ү / йү (йӱ)	y	ü	[y]	[y]	үр	yƣ	[yər]	28		8
27	17		ф	эф	f	f	[f]	[f]				8	4	
28	18		х	ха	x	h	[x]	[χ]				27	19	
29	19		ц	цэ	c	c	[tsʹ]	[tsˣ]				3	10	
30	20		ч	чэ	(çi)	q	[tɕʹ]	[tɕˣ]				4	16	
30	20		ч	чы	ç	ch	[tʂʹ]	[tʂˣ]				4	16	
31	21		ш	ша	ş	sh	[ʂ]	[ʂ]				22	14	
32	22		щ	щя	(şi)	x	[ɕ]	[ɕ]				22	14	
33			ъ	нинхо (Note: 硬號, "hard sign".)										
34		24	ы	ы	ь	i, e / i	[ɿ]	[ɨ]	ыр	ьƣ	[ər]	32		9
34		24	ы	ы	ь	i, e / i	[ʅ]	[ɨ]	ыр	ьƣ	[ər]	32		9
35			ь	ванхо (Note: 軟號, "soft sign".)										
36		27	э	э	e	ai / ê	[ɛ]	[ɛ]	эр	eƣ	[ɛr]	6		2
37		28	ю	ю (йу)	iu	iou	[iou]	[iɤu]	юр	iuƣ	[iour]			17
38		29	я	я (йа)	ia	ia	[ia]	[ia]	яр	iaƣ	[iar]			14
	23		(Note: Zero initial.)				[∅]	[ʁ]						
		2	ан		an	an	[æ̃]	[æ̃ ~ æn]	ар (Note: Erhua finals are spelled by replacing -н and -й with -р.)	aƣ (Note: Erhua finals are spelled by replacing -n with -ƣ.)	[æ̃r]			18
		5	ён		ion	iang	[iɑŋ]	[iɔ̃ ~ iɔn]	ёр	ioƣ	[iɑr]			39
		8	ин		in	in, ing / ing	[iŋ]	[in ~ ĩ]	ир	iƣ	[iər]			19
		10	он		on	ang	[ɑŋ]	[ɔ̃ ~ ɔn]	ор	oƣ	[ɑr]			20
		12	уа		ua	ua	[ua]	[ua]	уар	uaƣ	[uar]			10
		13	уан		uan	uan	[uæ̃]	[uæ̃ ~ uæn]	уар	uaƣ	[uæ̃r]			35
		14	уә		uə	uo	[uə]	[uɤ]	уәр	uəƣ	[uər]			12
		15	уй, уэй (Note: With х-, -уэй is used.)		ui	uei / uei, uai [sic]	[uei], [uɛi] [sic]	[uəi]	ур	uiƣ	?			25
		16	ун		un	uen, ong / ueng	[uŋ]	[uən ~ uə̃]	ур	uƣ	[ur]			21
		17	уон		uon	uang	[uɑŋ]	[uɔ̃ ~ uɔn]	уор	uoƣ	[uɑr]			36
		18	уэ		ue	uai	[uɛ]	[uɛⁱ]	уэр	ueƣ	[uɛr]			11
		21	үан		yan	üan	[yæ̃]	[yɛ̃ ~ yɛn]	үар	yaƣ	[yæ̃r]			37
		22	үә		yə	üe	[yə]	[ye]	үәр	yəƣ	[yər]			13
		23	үн		yn	ün, iong / iong	[yŋ]	[yn ~ ỹ]	үр	yƣ	[yr]			22
		25	ый		ьi	ei	[ei]	[əi]	ыр	ьiƣ	?			24
		26	ын		ьn	en, eng / eng	[əŋ]	[ə̃ ~ ən]	ыр	ьƣ	[ər]			23
		30	ян		ian	ian	[iæ̃]	[iɛ̃ ~ iɛn]	яр	iaƣ	[iæ̃r]			38
			эр, әр				[ɛɹ]	[əɹ]						
			эй											
