= Dragunov =

Dragunov may refer to:

- Dragunov (surname)
- Dragunov SVD, Soviet sniper rifle
- Dragunov SVU, Russian bullpup sniper carbine
