= Alexander Dragunov =

Soviet philogist and sinologist

Alexander Aleksandrovich Dragunov (Александр Александрович Драгунов; 6 March 1900 – 21 February 1955) was a Russian / Soviet philologist and Sinologist from the Institute of Oriental Manuscripts in Leningrad. He was considered a leading expert on the Dungan language and was involved in creating Latinxua Sin Wenz. He was the teacher of Sergey Yakhontov.

Dragunov graduated from the Leningrad State University in 1925. Between 1930 and 1936, he was based in Vladivostok and read lectures at the Far Eastern University. The rest of his life was spent in Leningrad.

Dragunov is particularly known for his contributions to phonetic reconstruction of the Old Mandarin language of the 12th to 14th centuries and his study of Chinese dialectology. His works led to the classification of the Xiang dialects (especially in Hunan) as a separate dialect group.

Dragunov was also an early proponent of the 23rd letter of the Tibetan alphabet as representing a voiced fricative in all positions. He chaired a commission that developed a Cyrillic script for the Dungan language.

== Works ==
- Dragunov, A. A. 1929. "Binoms of the Type <ni Tsu> in the Tangut-Chinese Dictionary." In <Akad. Nauk Doklady>, series B, 145-8.
- Dragunov (1930) "The hPhags-pa Script and Ancient Mandarin" Известия Академии наук СССР. Bulletin de l'Académie des Sciences de l'Union des Républiques Soviétiques Socialistes. VII série. Classe des humanités. 9: 627-647.
- Dragunov, Aleksandr A. (1931). "Review of Simon, W., Tibetisch-Chinesische Wortgleichungen." Orientalistische Literaturzeitung 26: 1085-90.
- Dragunov, Aleksandr A. (1936). “Voiced plosives and affricates in ancient Tibetan.” Bulletin of the Institute of History and Philology, Academia Sinica 7: 165-174.
- Dragunov, Aleksandr A. / Драгунов, Александр А. 1939. Особенности фонологической системы древнетибетского языка / Osobennosti fonologičeskoi sistemy drevnetibetskogo jazyka. [Peculiarities of the Old Tibetan Phonological System.] Записки института востоковеденииа Акад. Наук ССР / Zapiski Instituta vostokovedeniia Akad. Nauk SSR 7: 284-295.
- Dragunov, Aleksandr A. Исследования в области дунганской грамматики, ч. 1 — Категория вида и времени в дунганском языке (диалект Ганьсу) [Studies in Dungan Grammar, Part 1 - Category of the form and time in the Dungan language (a dialect of Gansu)], "Труды Ин-та востоковедения АН СССР", 1940, т. 27; "Proceedings of the Institute of Oriental Studies, Academy of Sciences of the USSR", 1940, vol 27.
- Dragunov, Aleksandr A. Исследования по грамматике современного китайского языка, т. 1, М.—Л., 1952. [Studies on the grammar of modern Chinese language, so 1, Moscow-Leningrad, 1952]
- Грамматическая система современного китайского разговорного языка, Л., 1962. [grammatical system of modern Chinese spoken language, L., 1962]
