= Soviet–Mongolian Mutual Assistance Pact =

Soviet–Mongolian Mutual Assistance Pact (Russian: Протокол Взаимопомощи между Союзом Советских Социалистических Республик и Монгольской Народной Республикой) It was an alliance treaty between the Soviet Union and the People's Republic of Mongolia, signed on March 12, 1936, in Ulaanbaatar, Mongolia by Peljidiin Genden, the prime minister of Mongolia, and Vladimir Tairov, the Soviet representative in Mongolia.

== Description ==
The treaty stipulated that if a third country attacked one of the two countries, the other country should provide assistance by all possible means. The government of the Republic of China believed that the treaty violated an earlier treaty and issued strong protests. Meanwhile, Japan signed the Anti-Comintern Pact in response. According to the treaty, after Japan began its full invasion of China in July, 1937, the Soviet Union sent the 57th Special Corps led by Ivan Konev, which was the main Soviet force in the Battles of Khalkhin Gol.
