= Latinxua Sin Wenz =

Historical set of Chinese romanizations

Latinxua Sin Wenz (Chinese: 拉丁化新文字; pinyin: Lādīnghuà Xīn Wénzì; lit. 'Latinized New Script' (Note: also known as Sin Wenz "New Script", Zhungguo Latinxua Sin Wenz "China Latinized New Script", Latinxua "Latinization"; translated as New Chinese Alphabetized Language in the name of an overseas San Francisco association)) is a historical series of romanizations for Chinese. Beifangxua Latinxua Sin Wenz (北方話拉丁化新文字), for Mandarin Chinese, was the original iteration, and regional Sin Wenz associations developed variations for their local varieties of Chinese.

Promoted by Communists as a revolutionary reform to combat illiteracy and replace Chinese characters, Sin Wenz distinctively does not indicate tones, for pragmatic reasons and to encourage the use of everyday colloquial language.

It was originally developed by groups of Chinese and Russian scholars in the Soviet Union and used by Chinese expatriates there until the majority of them left the Soviet Union. Later, it was revived for some time in Northern China where it was used in over 300 publications before its usage was ended by the People's Republic of China.

== History and development ==
The work towards constructing the Beifangxua Latinxua Sin Wenz system began in Moscow as early as 1928 when the Soviet Scientific Research Institute on China sought to create a means through which the large Chinese population living in the far eastern region of the USSR could be made literate, (Note: Principally the Chinese immigrant workers in Vladivostok and Khabarovsk.) facilitating their further education.

This was significantly different from all other romanization schemes in that, from the very outset, it was intended that the Latinxua Sin Wenz system, once established, would supersede the Chinese characters. They decided to use the Latin alphabet because they thought that it would serve their purpose better than Cyrillic. Unlike Gwoyeu Romatzyh, with its complex method of indicating tones, Latinxua Sin Wenz system does not indicate tones at all.

The eminent Moscow-based Chinese scholar Qu Qiubai (1899–1935) and the Russian linguist V.S. Kolokolov (1896–1979) devised a prototype romanization system in 1929.

In 1931 a coordinated effort between the Soviet sinologists Alekseyev V.M., Dragunov A.A. and Shprintsin A. G., and the Moscow-based Chinese scholars Qu Qiubai, Wu Yuzhang, Lin Boqu, Xiao San, Wang Xiangbao, and Xu Teli established the Latinxua Sin Wenz system. The system was supported by a number of Chinese intellectuals such as Guo Moruo and Lu Xun, and trials were conducted amongst 100,000 Chinese immigrant workers for about four years and later, in 1940–1942, in the communist-controlled Shaan-Gan-Ning Border Region of China. In November 1949, the railways in China's north-east adopted the Latinxua Sin Wenz system for all their telecommunications.

In 1940, several thousand members attended a Border Region Sin Wenz Society convention. Mao Zedong and Zhu De, head of the army, both contributed their calligraphy (in characters) for the masthead of the Sin Wenz Society's new journal. Outside the CCP, other prominent supporters included Sun Yat-sen's son, Sun Fo; Cai Yuanpei, the country's most prestigious educator; Tao Xingzhi, a leading educational reformer; and Lu Xun. Over thirty journals soon appeared written in Sin Wenz, plus large numbers of translations, biographies (including Lincoln, Franklin, Edison, Ford, and Charlie Chaplin), some contemporary Chinese literature, and a spectrum of textbooks. In 1940, the movement reached an apex when Mao's Border Region Government declared that the Sin Wenz had the same legal status as traditional characters in government and public documents. Many educators and political leaders looked forward to the day when they would be universally accepted and completely replace Chinese characters. Opposition arose, however, because the system was less well adapted to writing regional languages, and therefore would require learning Mandarin. Sin Wenz fell into relative disuse during the following years.

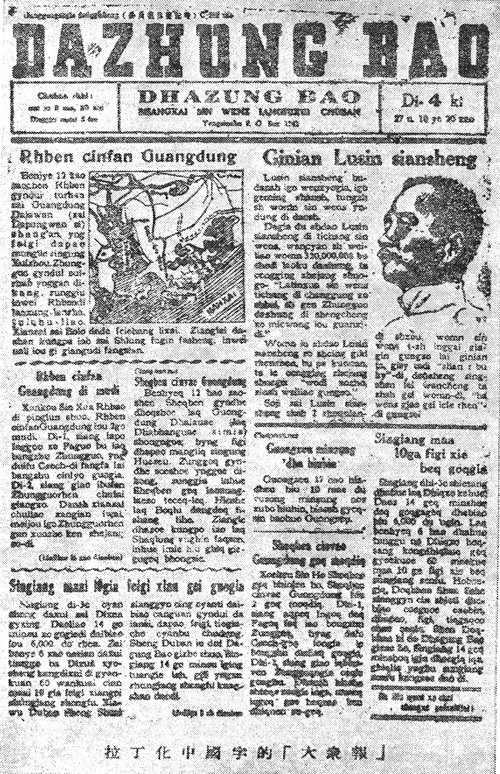
An issue of Dazhung Bao (大衆報; Dàzhòng Bào), a Mandarin–Shanghainese newspaper published in Latinxua in 1938. The subtitle of Dhazung Bao is in a Shanghainese adaptation of Sin Wenz, where dh represents the voiced alveolar plosive /d/, and the zh initial does not exist. Sheqben is the Shanghainese romanization of 日本 "Japan", where sh represents the voiced alveolar fricative /z/, and q represents the glottal stop /ʔ/. The pronunciation Lusin instead of *Lusyn (Lu Xun) is an example of Sin Wenz not following Beijing pronunciation.

For a time, the system was very important in spreading literacy in Northern China; and more than 300 publications totaling half a million issues appeared in Latinxua Sin Wenz. However:

In 1944 the latinization movement was officially curtailed in the communist-controlled areas [of China] on the pretext that there were insufficient trained cadres capable of teaching the system. It is more likely that, as the communists prepared to take power in a much wider territory, they had second thoughts about the rhetoric that surrounded the latinization movement; in order to obtain the maximum popular support, they withdrew support from a movement that deeply offended many supporters of the traditional writing system.

== Description ==
Varieties of Chinese were to have their own forms of Sin Wenz. Below is Beifangxua Latinxua Sin Wenz: that for Northern Mandarin.

Much of Beifangxua Latinxua Sin Wenz is similar to the successor Hanyu Pinyin in its orthography. However, it is formally based upon the pronunciation outlined by the 1913 Commission on the Unification of Pronunciation, rather than upon the Beijing pronunciation (as with Putonghua and Pinyin), hence the distinction between sounds such as palatalized alveolars (zi–ci–si) and palatalized velars (gi–ki–xi), or spellings such as yo and ung instead of ye or eng. Thus, Beijing is written as Beiging and Tianjin as Tianzin, and 畫 (pinyin: huà) and 下 (pinyin: xià) are written as xua and xia.

=== Initials ===
		Bilabial		Labiodental	Alveolar		Retroflex		Alveolo-palatal	Velar
		Voiceless	Voiced	Voiceless	Voiceless	Voiced	Voiceless	Voiced	Voiceless	Voiceless
Nasal			m [m] ㄇ m			n [n] ㄋ n				
Plosive	Unaspirated	b [p] ㄅ b			d [t] ㄉ d					g [k] ㄍ g
Plosive	Aspirated	p [pʰ] ㄆ p			t [tʰ] ㄊ t					k [kʰ] ㄎ k
Affricate	Unaspirated				z [t͡s] ㄗ z		zh [ʈ͡ʂ] ㄓ zh		g, z [t͡ɕ] ㄐ j	
Affricate	Aspirated				c [t͡sʰ] ㄘ c		ch [ʈ͡ʂʰ] ㄔ ch		k, c [t͡ɕʰ] ㄑ q	
Fricative				f [f] ㄈ f	s [s] ㄙ s		sh [ʂ] ㄕ sh	rh [ʐ] ㄖ r	x, s [ɕ] ㄒ x	x [x] ㄏ h
Liquid						l [l] ㄌ l				

=== Finals ===
Nucleus		a					ə						∅
Coda		∅	i	u	n	ŋ	∅	i	u	n	ŋ	ɻ	∅
Medial	∅	a [a] ㄚ a	ai [ai̯] ㄞ ai	ao [au̯] ㄠ ao	an [an] ㄢ an	ang/ong [aŋ] ㄤ ang	o/e^{1} [ɤ] ㄜ e	ei [ei̯] ㄟ ei	ou [ou̯] ㄡ ou	en [ən] ㄣ en	eng [əŋ] ㄥ eng	r [aɚ̯] ㄦ er	-^{3} [ɨ] ㄭ (-i)
Medial	i	ia [ja] ㄧㄚ ia		iao [jau̯] ㄧㄠ iao	ian [jɛn] ㄧㄢ ian	iang [jaŋ] ㄧㄤ iang	ie [je] ㄧㄝ ie		iou, iu [jou̯] ㄧㄡ iu	in [in] ㄧㄣ in	ing [iŋ] ㄧㄥ ing		i [i] ㄧ i
Medial	u	ua [wa] ㄨㄚ ua	uai [wai̯] ㄨㄞ uai		uan [wan] ㄨㄢ uan	uang [waŋ] ㄨㄤ uang	uo [wo] ㄨㄛ uo	ui^{2} [wei̯] ㄨㄟ ui		un^{2} [wən] ㄨㄣ un	ung^{2} [ʊŋ] ㄨㄥ ong		u [u] ㄨ u
Medial	y				yan [ɥɛn] ㄩㄢ üan		ye/yo^{1} [ɥe] (üe)			yn [yn] ㄩㄣ (ün)	yng [jʊŋ] ㄩㄥ iong		y [y] ㄩ ü

^{1}e and ye is written as o and yo after initials g, k and x. For example: gogo (Chinese: 哥哥; pinyin: gēge; lit. 'elder brother'), xyosheng (Chinese: 学生; pinyin: xuésheng; lit. 'student')
^{2}Standalone ui, un and ung are written as wei, wen and weng respectively.
^{3}What is written as i (IPA [ɨ]) after zh, ch, sh, r, z, c and s in pinyin is not written in Sin Wenz. This "null vowel" feature is identical to Zhuyin.

As in pinyin, spacing in Sin Wenz is based on whole words, not single syllables. Except for u, others syllables starting with u is always written with a w replacing the u. The syllable u is only preceded by a w when it occurs in the middle of a word. For syllables starting with i, the i is replaced by a j (in case of the syllables i, in and ing, preceded by a j) only in the middle of a word. Syllables starting with y is preceded by a j only when preceded by a consonant in the middle of a word. These are unlike pinyin, which always uses w and y regardless of the positions of the syllables. As in pinyin, the apostrophe (') is used before a, o, and e to separate syllables in a word where ambiguity could arise.

=== Irregular spellings ===
Because Sin Wenz is written without indicating tones, ambiguity could arise with certain words with the same sound but different tones. In order to circumvent this problem, Sin Wenz defined a list of exceptions: "characters with fixed spellings" (定型字). For example, 買 (pinyin: mǎi; lit. 'buy') and 賣 (pinyin: mài; lit. 'sell') are of the same sound but different tones. The former is written as maai and the latter is written as mai in Sin Wenz. The word 有 (pinyin: yǒu; lit. 'to have') is also special; it is written as iou, as opposed to iu, which may be 又 (pinyin: yòu; lit. 'once more').

Telegrams sent by workers for the railways in the northeast of China switched from Zhuyin to Sin Wenz in 1950, then from Sin Wenz to Hanyu Pinyin in 1958; the 5 irregular spellings of 買 maai, 試 shii, 板 baan, 不 bu, and 李 lii, in use during the Hanyu Pinyin period, were inherited from Sin Wenz.

In addition, Sin Wenz also calls for the use of the postal romanization when writing place names in China, as well as preservation of foreign spellings (hence Latinxua rather than Ladingxua).

== Notes ==
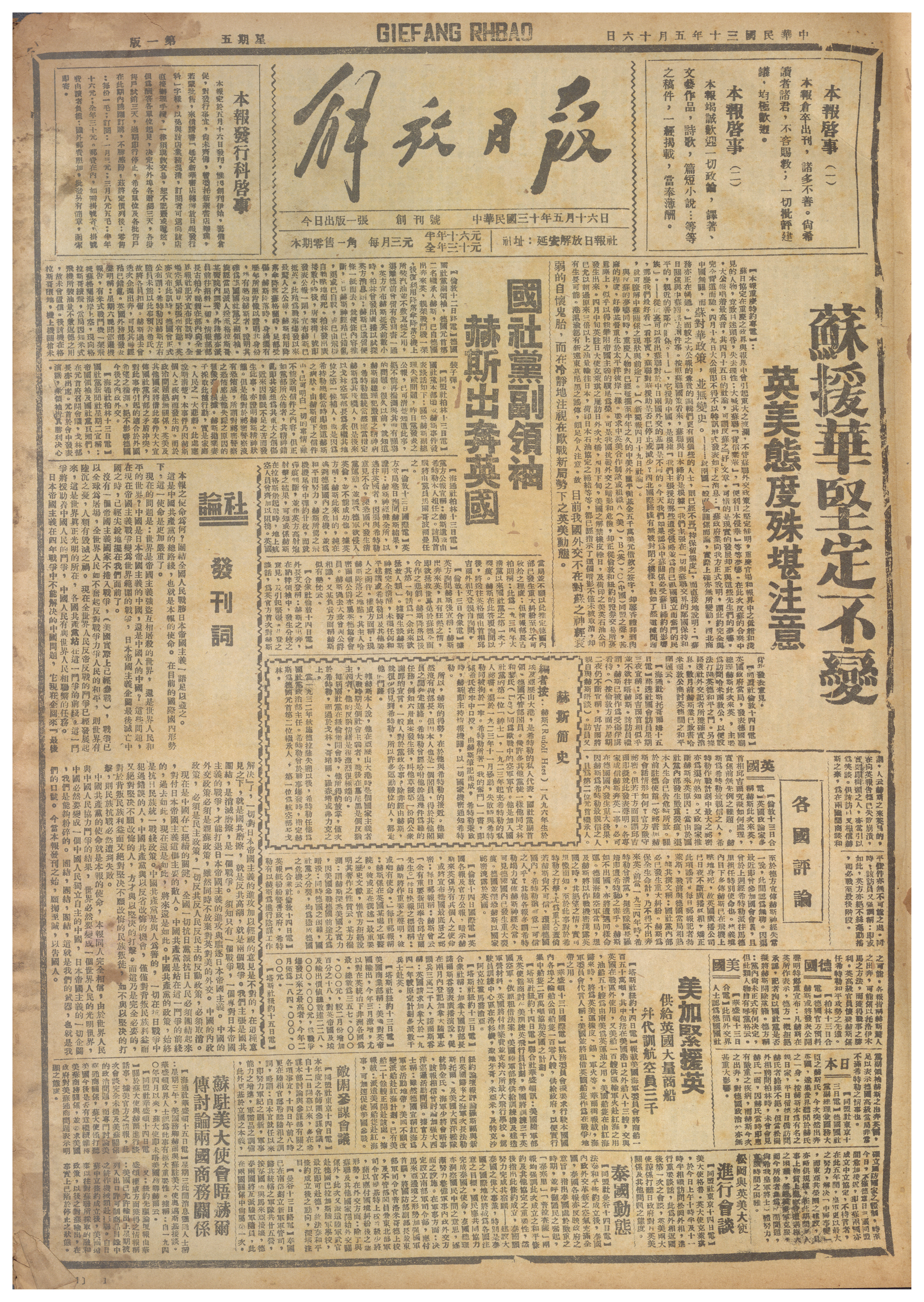
Giefang Rhbao — Jiefang Daily (pinyin: Jiěfàng Rìbào).
