= Beijing Mandarin =

Beijing Mandarin may refer to:

- Beijing dialect, of Mandarin Chinese
- Beijing Mandarin (division of Mandarin), the branch of Mandarin that includes the Beijing dialect

== See also ==
- Beijingese (disambiguation)
