= Beijingese =

Beijingese or Bejingnese may refer to:

- A person from or the culture of Beijing
- Beijing Mandarin (disambiguation)
  - The Beijing dialect
  - Beijing Mandarin (division of Mandarin), a variety of Mandarin spoken in and around Beijing

== See also ==
- Pekingese, a dog breed
- Pekin (disambiguation)
- Peking (disambiguation)
- Beijing (disambiguation)
