= Beijing Paralympics =

Beijing Paralympics may refer to:

- 2008 Summer Paralympics, in Beijing, China
- 2022 Winter Paralympics, in Beijing, China

== See also ==
- Beijing Olympics (disambiguation)
- Beijing (disambiguation)
