= Beijing Olympics =

Beijing Olympics may refer to:

- 2008 Summer Olympics, Games of the XXIX Olympiad
- 2022 Winter Olympics, XXIV Winter Olympic Games

== See also ==
- Beijing Paralympics (disambiguation)
- Beijing (disambiguation)
- Olympics (disambiguation)
