= Northeastern Mandarin =

Variety of Mandarin, spoken in Northeast China

- 东北话; Dōngběihuà
- Native to: Jilin, Heilongjiang, Liaoning and Inner Mongolia provinces of China; (Overseas, United States-New York City, Russia-primarily in Primorsky Krai)
- Region: Northeast China, Russian Far East (Taz)
- Speakers: 98.02 million (2012)
- Language family: Sino-Tibetan: Sinitic; Chinese; Mandarin; Northeastern Mandarin
- Dialects: Taz; Shenyang; Harbin; Changchun

Language codes
- ISO 639-3: –
- ISO 639-6: dbiu
- Glottolog: nort3283
- Linguasphere: 79-AAA-bc
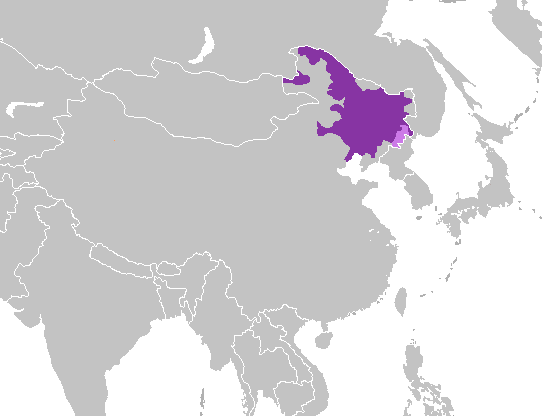

Northeastern Mandarin (simplified Chinese: 东北话; traditional Chinese: 東北話; pinyin: Dōngběihuà; lit. 'Northeast speech' or 东北官话; 東北官話; Dōngběiguānhuà; 'Northeast Mandarin') is the subgroup of Mandarin Chinese spoken in Northeast China with the exception of the Liaodong Peninsula and few enclaves along Amur and Ussuri rivers. The classification of Northeastern Mandarin as a separate dialect group from Beijing Mandarin was first proposed by Li Rong, author of the Language Atlas of China, in 1989. However, many researchers do not accept the distinction.

== Geographical distribution ==
Northeastern Mandarin varieties are spoken in the northeastern part of China, in the provinces of Liaoning (except its southern part from Dalian to Dandong where Jiaoliao Mandarin is spoken), Jilin and Heilongjiang, and in some northern parts of Inner Mongolia. The number of speakers was estimated in 1987 as 82 million, and 98 million in 2012. The latter text also estimates that there are 37 million speakers in Heilongjiang, 26 million in Jilin, 28 million in Liaoning, and 6 million in Inner Mongolia.

== Dialects ==
The Language Atlas of China divided Northeastern Mandarin into three subgroups, following a classification be Hè Wēi based on the occurrence of nasal initials in words having a zero initial in Beijing:

- Ji–Shen (吉瀋) in the east, including Jilin dialect and Shenyang dialect, has a zero initial in these words, as in Beijing.
- Ha–Fu (哈阜) in the west, including Harbin dialect and Changchun dialect, have nasal initials in these words.
- Hei–Song (黑松) in the north, including Qiqihar dialect, have zero or nasal initials in random variation.

More distant varieties tend to be more similar to the Beijing dialect than closer ones, so that the speech of Harbin is closer to that of Beijing than that of Jilin and Changchun, which in turn are closer than that of Shenyang.

A form of Northeastern Mandarin (with some words from Udege and Nanai) has been spoken since approximately 1800 by the Taz people nearby in the Russian Far East, primarily in Primorsky Krai.

Overseas, Northeastern Mandarin is increasingly being spoken in New York City Chinatowns such as Flushing.

== Phonology ==
Northeastern Mandarin shares similarities with the Beijing dialect, such as a similar distribution of the Middle Chinese entering tone across the other tone classes and the preservation of initial [w], where the dialects of Hebei province, which surrounds Beijing, have [v]. However, in northeastern Chinese, final -ian or -üan is pronounced with an [æ] rather than with [ɛ] or [e] as in the standard. The [ʐ] initial of Beijing (spelled r- in pinyin) is generally elided in northeastern varieties.

== Cultural and regional identity ==
Mandarin variants like Northeastern Mandarin often contribute to a strong regional identity. Because of its informal usage of words and tones, comedians often use Northeast dialects when performing. Comedian Zhao Benshan is recognized nationwide for his performances which make humorous use of Northeastern dialect and Northeastern Errenzhuan folk dance and song traditions.
