= Shenyang Mandarin =

Northeastern Mandarin dialect of Shenyang, China

- 瀋陽話 / 沈阳话; Shěnyánghuà
- Native to: China
- Region: Shenyang
- Language family: Sino-Tibetan: Sinitic; Chinese; Mandarin; Northeastern Mandarin; Shenyang Mandarin

Language codes
- ISO 639-3: –
- Glottolog: shen1252

Shenyang Mandarin (Chinese: 沈阳话) is a dialect of Chinese language used by people in and around Shenyang, the capital of Liaoning province and the largest city in Northeast China. Like other Northeastern Mandarin dialects, it is very close to Standard Chinese but has notably distinctive tones, pronunciations and lexicon, although some people consider it as merely having a strong accent rather than being a distinct dialect. Due to its similarity to Standard Chinese, its pronunciations can be phonetically transcribed readily with pinyin or using character wordplay. Although Standard Chinese is taught in schools and officially promoted as the formal lingua franca, Shenyang Mandarin remains the main variety of Chinese used in local daily usages, and is widely imitated in popular culture and comedy as the stereotypical Northeastern broad accent.

== Phonology ==
Relative pitch changes of the four tones in Standard Chinese. Shenyang diverges the most with tone 1.

Shenyang dialect has 19 initial consonants, as opposed to the 21 in Standard Mandarin. Notably, the retroflex consonants [ʈ͡ʂ], [ʈ͡ʂʰ] and [ʂ] in Standard Mandarin are pronounced as [t͡s], [t͡sʰ] and [s], respectively, while [ɻ] is omitted. While lost in Standard Mandarin, Middle Chinese retroflex nasal [ɳ] is preserved in the Shenyang dialect. [v] also exists in the Shenyang dialect.

Initial consonants, Shenyang dialect
		Labial	Alveolar	Dental sibilants	Palatal	Velar
Stops	unaspirated	p	t	t͡s	t͡ɕ	k
Stops	aspirated	pʰ	tʰ	t͡sʰ	t͡ɕʰ	kʰ
Nasals		m	n		ɳ	
Fricatives		f	v	s	ɕ	x
Approximants			l			

Standard Mandarin diphthongs tend to be pronounced as monophthongs in the Shenyang dialect. For example, [ai] becomes [æ], and [au] becomes [ɔ].

The most distinctive aspect of the Shenyang dialect is the much lower pitch of the first tone than in Standard Mandarin. It would be positioned at 2, rather than 5, on the chart shown (right). As a result, it can sound rather like the third tone.

Like the Beijing dialect, the Shenyang dialect is characterized by erhua or r-coloring, though with a significant lack of rhotic consonants (known colloquially as "speaking with the tongue straightened").

== Vocabulary ==
Some of the words in the Shenyang dialect come from other languages like the Manchu language. One example is 旮旯儿 gālár 'corner'.

Examples of words in various Northeastern dialects (not necessarily specific to Shenyang) include:

Northeastern Mandarin	pinyin	Standard Mandarin	pinyin	Translation
不赶趟儿	bù gǎntàngr	来不及	lái bù jí	too late
波楞盖儿	bōlingàr	膝盖	xīgài	kneecap
疙瘩、圪塔	gāda	地方	dìfang	place (noun)
得瑟	dèse	卖弄	màinòng	to show off
老鼻子（了）	lǎobízi(le)	很多	hěnduō	a lot
埋汰	máitai	脏	zāng	dirty, filthy
嘎哈	gàhá	干什么 、干嘛	gànshénme, gànmá	What are you doing?
砢碜	kēchen, kēzhen	丑、难看	chǒu, nánkàn	ugly, hideous
老	lǎo	很	hěn	very
贼	zéi	特别	tèbié	exceedingly
毙	bì	棒	bàng	good, excellent
蚂蛉	māling	蜻蜓	qīngtíng	dragonfly
嘎赌	gàdu	打赌	dǎdǔ	to bet
