= Taz people =

Ethnic group

Taz
Тазы
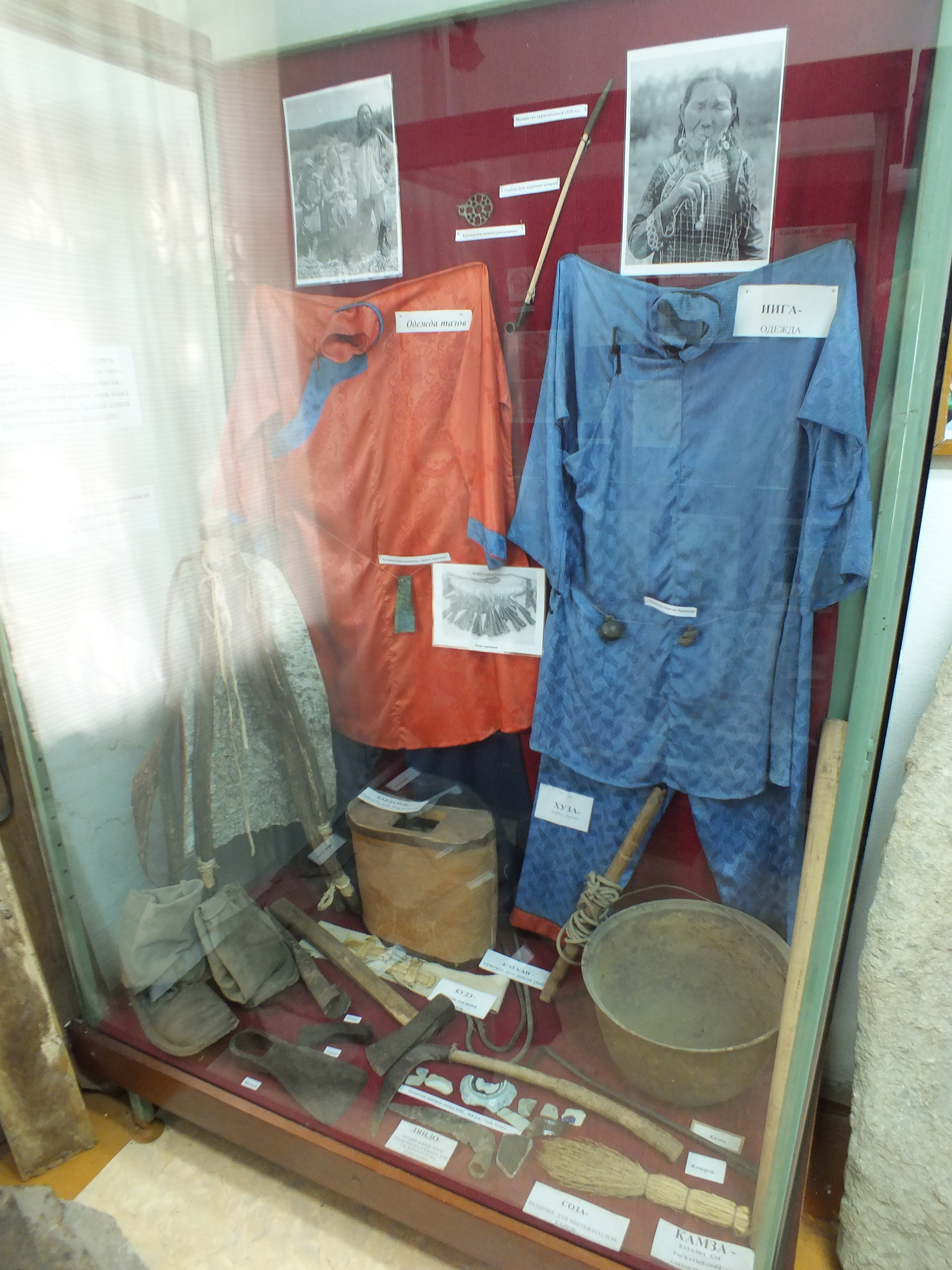
- Traditional Taz clothing and artifacts in a Russian museum

Total population
- 235

Regions with significant populations
- Russia: 235

Languages
- Russian • Taz

Religion
- Christianity (Russian Orthodox)

Related ethnic groups
- Other Sinitic peoples; (Bai, Han Chinese, Hui, Dungan); Udege, Nanai, Oroch, other Tungusic peoples

The Taz (Russian: Та́зы, romanized: Tázy; Chinese: 塔兹; pinyin: Tǎzī) are a mixed Sinitic and Tungusic ethnic group who primarily live in Primorsky Krai, Russia. The Taz people emerged from intermarriages between Han Chinese men and Tungusic women of the Udege, Nanai, and Oroch ethnic groups in Outer Manchuria. Today, the Taz primarily speak Russian, but their traditional language is the Taz dialect, a variety of Northeast Mandarin with loanwords from Udege and Nanai. The modern ethnonym "Taz" is a Russified version of the Chinese term tazi (meaning "indigenous, native").

== History ==
The origins of the Taz can be traced back to the period when Outer Manchuria was still part of China under the Qing dynasty. The Qing dynasty formally prohibited Han settlement in Manchuria, with the exception of some Han bannermen. This policy aimed to preserve the Manchu homeland as a refuge in the possible event of an overthrow of the Manchu-led Qing dynasty by the Han majority. However, both illegal and legal Han immigration persisted as Manchu landlords desired Han peasants to rent their land and grow grain. In the 1700s, the Han Chinese made up 80% of the population in the garrisons and towns of Manchuria, but the region remained sparsely populated. This was especially the case with Outer Manchuria, as the vast majority of Han Chinese settled in Inner Manchuria due to it being inhabited by Manchu landlords and more developed than Outer Manchuria.

The Han Chinese referred to the Tungusic peoples who inhabited Manchuria as "Jurchens" and during the Ming dynasty categorized them into three groups. The Jianzhou Jurchens, who would go on to create the Manchu, inhabited the southern regions of Inner Manchuria, and were considered the most advanced division among the Jurchens. They practiced sedentary agriculture and were heavily influenced by the Han Chinese. The Haixi Jurchens, who lived in the northern regions of Inner Manchuria, were semi-nomadic pastoralists and were heavily influenced by the Mongols. The northernmost Tungusic group, the Yeren Jurchens, inhabited Outer Manchuria. They maintained a more traditional Tungusic lifestyle which consisted of foraging in the forests and rivers near their settlements.

The Haixi Jurchens were conquered by the Jianzhou and absorbed into the Manchu ethnicity. The Yeren were considered less developed than the Jianzhou and Haixi, and their hunter-gatherer lifestyles made it difficult for the Jianzhou to sedentarize and assimilate them into the Manchu identity. The Yeren Jurchens are recognized as multiple distinct ethnic groups today, such as the Udege, Negidal, Evenki, and Nanai. The Manchus eventually became highly Sinicized, whereas the Tungusic ethnic groups of Outer Manchuria did not. However, the Udege, Ulchi, and Nanai adopted certain Chinese influences, particularly in their religion and clothing. These influences included Chinese dragons on ceremonial robes, scroll and spiral bird designs, monster mask motifs, celebrations of the Chinese New Year, the use of silk, cotton, iron cooking pots, heated homes, and elements of Chinese Buddhism, which modified their shamanastic practices.

In the 1830s to 1850s, the Han Chinese began to settle around the Ussuri river of Outer Manchuria. Initially, they stayed only during the warm seasons, engaging in ginseng harvesting. Later, hunters for deer antlers, seafood gatherers, and mushroom pickers joined the ginseng collectors. Over time, some settled permanently, taking up agriculture and trade. Among the settlers, Han men predominated and there were few Han women, leading to marriages between Han Chinese men with women from local Tungusic ethnic groups—Udege women in the southern areas and Nanai women in the northern areas, along with some intermarriage with Oroch women. This led to the emergence of a mixed population, referred to by the Chinese term tazi (meaning "indigenous, native").

After Outer Manchuria was annexed by the Russian Empire in 1860, Russians adopted this term, phonetically altered to "Taz", to describe the indigenous population of Primorye, primarily Udege people, as well as Oroch, and the mixed Sinitic-Tungusic community. Vladimir Arsenyev, a researcher of the Russian Far East, clarified this terminology, distinguishing between Udege people, Han Chinese settlers, and the new ethnic group of mixed origin that had emerged by the late 19th century. He described this group as "Sinicized Udege" as they lived sedentary lives, practiced gardening, and spoke a northern Chinese dialect but he considered them a distinct ethnicity from the Han Chinese. This group, culturally and economically distinct from the Han Chinese, did not identify as Han themselves. The name "Taz" eventually became associated with this group. The first relatively reliable data regarding the Taz population dates to 1872, which recorded that there were 638 Taz living in Ussuri krai.

The Soviet Union was initially supportive of the Taz people but their traditional culture suffered significant losses from the late 1950s to the 1970s, a period when strained political relations between the Soviet Union and China prompted widespread anti-Chinese sentiment and a campaign to expel Chinese residents from Soviet territory. When Soviet authorities began deporting Chinese and Korean citizens of the Soviet Union from the Russian Far East to Central Asia in 1936, the Taz were initially included. Due to clarifications provided by Vladimir Arsenyev, some Taz avoided deportation. Nevertheless, most Taz, who had previously lived in villages in the Olginsky, Kavalerovsky, and Tetyukhinsky districts, were relocated in 1938 to the village of Mikhailovka in the Olginsky district. This village had been vacated after the deportation of its Korean inhabitants. After relocating to Mikhailovka, the Taz transitioned to living in wooden houses. In addition to gardening, they began raising cows, pigs, chickens, and ducks. Their clothing largely became indistinguishable from the local Russian population, though Taz women occasionally wore traditional outfits—black jackets and trousers—and elders kept traditional attire for funerals.

The Taz dialect is a variety of Northeastern Mandarin, with significant borrowings from the Udege and Nanai languages. After Outer Manchuria became part of the Russian Empire in 1860, Russian settlers began arriving in the Far East, and the Taz identity came under the influence of Russian culture and language. During the Soviet era, Taz servicemen proficient in the dialect could intercept Chinese military communications conducted in Mandarin without specialized training. However, assimilation accelerated under Soviet rule with the introduction of mandatory education in Russian. In the 1880s, there were 1,015 speakers of the Taz dialect.

In 2000, the Taz were officially recognized and included in the unified list of minor indigenous peoples of Russia (Government Resolution No. 255 of March 24, 2000). According to the 2002 All-Russian Census, the Taz population totalled 276 people, 256 of whom resided in Primorsky Krai, specifically in the upper Ussuri River basin and the Olginsky district. Only five individuals (1.95%) reported proficiency in their native language, while all 276 spoke Russian (100%). The Taz population comprised 131 men (53 urban, 78 rural) and 145 women (57 urban, 88 rural). Overall, 110 individuals lived in urban areas (53 men, 57 women) and 166 in rural areas (78 men, 88 women). The largest concentration of Taz (71 people) in 2002 was in the village of Mikhailovka, Olginsky district of Primorsky Krai. In Bashkortostan, four people identified themselves as Taz. In Khabarovsk Krai, three people identified themselves as Taz – one male and two females, all of them living in urban areas.

In the 2010 Census, the Taz population slightly declined to 274 people, 253 of whom lived in Primorsky Krai. All 274 Taz knew Russian and 262 declared Russian as their native language. Among the Taz, 10 knew Chinese, 10 knew English, 2 knew Uzbek, and 1 knew Khakas but none reported knowledge of the Taz language. Therefore, the Taz dialect is likely extinct today. In 2021, the Taz population was 235.

== Culture ==
The Taz initially had customs that were much more Tungusic in nature, with a strong emphasis on a hunter-gatherer lifestyle. The Taz were engaged in fishing, primarily catching salmon species using spears, nets, and hooks; hunting deer, elk, wild boar, and fur-bearing animals with spears, rifles, and traps; and gathering resources such as ginseng, tree fungi, seaweed, trepang, and scallop shells. Over time, they adopted agricultural practices from the Chinese, including the names of crops, farming techniques, and methods of field cultivation.

By the late 19th century, the Taz lived sedentary lifestyles in permanent homes called fanzas. They practiced gardening, wore Chinese-style clothing, and displayed notable differences from Chinese cultural norms. Unlike Chinese women, Taz women worked alongside men in gardening and participated in hunting expeditions in the taiga. While raw animal products were avoided by the Chinese, the Taz, like the Udege and Nanai, consumed raw meat and fish dishes. Their culinary traditions of the Taz are influenced by northern Chinese cuisine. Popular dishes include mantou, baozi, and jiaozi.

Before Primorye's incorporation into the Russian Empire, the Taz religious beliefs were primarily influenced by practices from Northeast China, including Buddhism, ancestor worship, Manchu folk religion, and shamanism, with local elements. Religious beliefs combined elements of Buddhism and Chinese ancestor worship, including a belief in humans possessing 99 sequentially dying souls. After the region's annexation in 1860, the Taz were Christianized. Today, the Taz who identify as religious are predominantly Russian Orthodox Christians.
