= Pekin =

Pekin may refer to:

== Places ==
- A historic spelling of a name of Beijing, China
- Pekin (hotel), a four star hotel in Moscow, Russia

=== United States ===
- Pekin, Illinois
- Pekin Township, Tazewell County, Illinois
- Pekin, Indiana
  - Old Pekin, Indiana
  - New Pekin, Indiana
- Pekin, Iowa
- Paducah, Kentucky, originally settled as Pekin
- Pekin, Maryland
- Pekin Township, Michigan
- Pekin, New York, a hamlet in the town of Cambria, New York
- Pekin, North Dakota
- Pekin, Carroll County, Ohio
- Pekin, Warren County, Ohio

== Animals ==
- Red-billed leiothrix, or Pekin robin
- American Pekin, an American breed of duck
- German Pekin, a European breed of duck
- Pekin (chicken), a breed of chicken

== People ==
- Tim Pekin (born 1965), former Australian rules footballer

== Other uses ==
- HMS Mohawk, a 1856 British gunvessel renamed Pekin in 1863
- Salix babylonica, or Pekin willow

== See also ==
- Pekin duck (disambiguation)
- Peking (disambiguation)
- Pekingese
- Peqin, a town in Albania
- Beijing (disambiguation)
- Beijingese (disambiguation)
