= Pekin duck =

Pekin duck may refer to:

- American Pekin, an American breed of duck (the Pekin of the American Poultry Association)
- German Pekin, a European breed of duck (the Pekin of the Poultry Club of Great Britain)
- Peking duck, a Chinese duck dish
- Peking Duk, an Australian music duo

== See also ==
- Beijing Ducks, a Chinese basketball team
- Peking (disambiguation)
- Pekin (disambiguation)
- Duck (disambiguation)
