= Cyrillization of Chinese =

Transcription of the Chinese language into Cyrillic

The cyrillization of Chinese is the transcription of Chinese characters into the Cyrillic alphabet.

The Palladius system is the official Russian standard for transcribing Mandarin Chinese into Russian, with variants existing for Ukrainian, Belarusian and the various languages of Russia. It was created by Palladius Kafarov, a Russian sinologist and monk who spent thirty years in China in the nineteenth century. Other languages that use the Cyrillic script have systems designed for their own language.

== Russian system ==
=== Initials ===
Note that because the Russian version of the Cyrillic alphabet has no letters for dz or dzh (although дз and дж are found in Bulgarian, and also ѕ and џ are found in Serbian and Macedonian Cyrillic), the digraphs цз and чж are used respectively.

		Bilabial		Labiodental	Alveolar		Retroflex		Alveolo-palatal	Velar
		Voiceless	Voiced	Voiceless	Voiceless	Voiced	Voiceless	Voiced	Voiceless	Voiceless
Nasal			м [m] m ㄇ m			н [n] n ㄋ n				
Plosive	Unaspirated	б [p] p ㄅ b			д [t] t ㄉ d					г [k] k ㄍ g
Plosive	Aspirated	п [pʰ] p' ㄆ p			т [tʰ] t' ㄊ t					к [kʰ] k' ㄎ k
Affricate	Unaspirated				цз [ts] ts ㄗ z		чж [ʈʂ] ch ㄓ zh		цз [tɕ] ch ㄐ j	
Affricate	Aspirated				ц [tsʰ] ts' ㄘ c		ч [ʈʂʰ] ch' ㄔ ch		ц [tɕʰ] ch' ㄑ q	
Fricative				ф [f] f ㄈ f	с [s] s ㄙ s		ш [ʂ] sh ㄕ sh	ж [ʐ] j ㄖ r	с [ɕ] hs ㄒ x	х [x] h ㄏ h
Lateral						л [l] l ㄌ l				

=== Finals ===
Nucleus		a					ə						∅
Coda		∅	i	u	n	ŋ	∅	i	u	n	ŋ	ɻ	∅
Medial	∅	a [a] ㄚ a	ай [ai̯] ai ㄞ ai	ao [au̯] ao ㄠ ao	ань [an] an ㄢ an	ан [aŋ] ang ㄤ ang	э [ɤ] ê/o ㄜ e	эй [ei̯] ei ㄟ ei	оу [ou̯] ou ㄡ ou	энь [ən] ên ㄣ en	эн [əŋ] êng ㄥ eng	эр [aɚ̯] êrh ㄦ er	и/ы [ʅ/ɿ] ih/ŭ -i
Medial	i	я [i̯a] ia ㄧㄚ ia		яо [i̯au̯] iao ㄧㄠ iao	янь [i̯ɛn] ien ㄧㄢ ian	ян [i̯aŋ] iang ㄧㄤ iang	е [i̯e] ieh ㄧㄝ ie		ю [i̯ou̯] iu ㄧㄡ iu	инь [in] in ㄧㄣ in	ин [iŋ] ing ㄧㄥ ing		и [i] i ㄧ i
Medial	u	уа [u̯a] ua ㄨㄚ ua	уай [u̯ai̯] uai ㄨㄞ uai		уань [u̯an] uan ㄨㄢ uan	уан [u̯aŋ] uang ㄨㄤ uang	о [u̯o] o/uo ㄨㄛ uo	уй [u̯ei̯] ui ㄨㄟ ui		унь [u̯ən] un ㄨㄣ un	ун [ʊŋ] ung ㄨㄥ ong		у [u] u ㄨ u
Medial	y				юань [y̯ɛn] üan ㄩㄢ üan		юэ [y̯e] üeh ㄩㄝ üe			юнь [yn] ün ㄩㄣ ün	юн [i̯ʊŋ] iung ㄩㄥ iong		юй [y] ü ㄩ ü

In composites, coda ng is transcribed нъ when the following syllable starts with a vowel. For example, the names of the cities of Chang'an and Hengyang are transcribed as Чанъань and Хэнъян.

In syllables with no initial, w is transcribed as в in all cases except wu, transcribed as у. For example, the names of the cities of Wuwei (both Wuwei, Anhui and Wuwei, Gansu) and Wanning are transcribed as Увэй and Ваньнин.

=== Comparison chart ===
This table establishes correspondence between the Russian Palladius system together with the two Romanization systems most commonly used in English-speaking countries: Pinyin and Wade–Giles. It contains every syllable found in Ilya Oshanin's Great Chinese–Russian Dictionary.

Б / B				П / P				М / M				Ф / F			
Cyrillic	Pinyin	WG	MPS	Cyrillic	Pinyin	WG	MPS	Cyrillic	Pinyin	WG	MPS	Cyrillic	Pinyin	WG	MPS
ба	ba	pa	ㄅㄚ	па	pa	pʻa	ㄆㄚ	ма	ma	ma	ㄇㄚ	фа	fa	fa	ㄈㄚ
бай	bai	pai	ㄅㄞ	пай	pai	pʻai	ㄆㄞ	май	mai	mai	ㄇㄞ				
бан	bang	pang	ㄅㄤ	пан	pang	pʻang	ㄆㄤ	ман	mang	mang	ㄇㄤ	фан	fang	fang	ㄈㄤ
бань	ban	pan	ㄅㄢ	пань	pan	pʻan	ㄆㄢ	мань	man	man	ㄇㄢ	фань	fan	fan	ㄈㄢ
бао	bao	pao	ㄅㄠ	пао	pao	pʻao	ㄆㄠ	мао	mao	mao	ㄇㄠ				
бе	bie	pieh	ㄅㄧㄝ	пе	pie	pʻieh	ㄆㄧㄝ	ме	mie	mieh	ㄇㄧㄝ				
би	bi	pi	ㄅㄧ	пи	pi	pʻi	ㄆㄧ	ми	mi	mi	ㄇㄧ				
бин	bing	ping	ㄅㄧㄥ	пин	ping	pʻing	ㄆㄧㄥ	мин	ming	ming	ㄇㄧㄥ				
бинь	bin	pin	ㄅㄧㄣ	пинь	pin	pʻin	ㄆㄧㄣ	минь	min	min	ㄇㄧㄣ				
бо	bo	po	ㄅㄛ	по	po	pʻo	ㄆㄛ	мо	mo	mo	ㄇㄛ	фо	fo	fo	ㄈㄛ
				поу	pou	pʻou	ㄆㄡ	моу	mou	mou	ㄇㄡ	фоу	fou	fou	ㄈㄡ
бу	bu	pu	ㄅㄨ	пу	pu	pʻu	ㄆㄨ	му	mu	mu	ㄇㄨ	фу	fu	fu	ㄈㄨ
								мэ	me	mê	ㄇㄜ				
бэй	bei	pei	ㄅㄟ	пэй	pei	pʻei	ㄆㄟ	мэй	mei	mei	ㄇㄟ	фэй	fei	fei	ㄈㄟ
бэн	beng	pêng	ㄅㄥ	пэн	peng	pʻêng	ㄆㄥ	мэн	meng	mêng	ㄇㄥ	фэн	feng	fêng	ㄈㄥ
бэнь	ben	pên	ㄅㄣ	пэнь	pen	pʻên	ㄆㄣ	мэнь	men	mên	ㄇㄣ	фэнь	fen	fên	ㄈㄣ
								мю	miu	miu	ㄇㄧㄡ				
бянь	bian	pien	ㄅㄧㄢ	пянь	pian	pʻien	ㄆㄧㄢ	мянь	mian	mien	ㄇㄧㄢ				
бяо	biao	piao	ㄅㄧㄠ	пяо	piao	pʻiao	ㄆㄧㄠ	мяо	miao	miao	ㄇㄧㄠ	фяо	fiao	fiao	ㄈㄧㄠ
Д / D				Т / T				Н / N				Л / L			
Cyrillic	Pinyin	WG	MPS	Cyrillic	Pinyin	WG	MPS	Cyrillic	Pinyin	WG	MPS	Cyrillic	Pinyin	WG	MPS
да	da	ta	ㄉㄚ	та	ta	tʻa	ㄊㄚ	на	na	na	ㄋㄚ	ла	la	la	ㄌㄚ
дай	dai	tai	ㄉㄞ	тай	tai	tʻai	ㄊㄞ	най	nai	nai	ㄋㄞ	лай	lai	lai	ㄌㄞ
дан	dang	tang	ㄉㄤ	тан	tang	tʻang	ㄊㄤ	нан	nang	nang	ㄋㄤ	лан	lang	lang	ㄌㄤ
дань	dan	tan	ㄉㄢ	тань	tan	tʻan	ㄊㄢ	нань	nan	nan	ㄋㄢ	лань	lan	lan	ㄌㄢ
дао	dao	tao	ㄉㄠ	тао	tao	tʻao	ㄊㄠ	нао	nao	nao	ㄋㄠ	лао	lao	lao	ㄌㄠ
де	die	tieh	ㄉㄧㄝ	те	tie	tʻieh	ㄊㄧㄝ	не	nie	nieh	ㄋㄧㄝ	ле	lie	lieh	ㄌㄧㄝ
ди	di	ti	ㄉㄧ	ти	ti	tʻi	ㄊㄧ	ни	ni	ni	ㄋㄧ	ли	li	li	ㄌㄧ
дин	ding	ting	ㄉㄧㄥ	тин	ting	tʻing	ㄊㄧㄥ	нин	ning	ning	ㄋㄧㄥ	лин	ling	ling	ㄌㄧㄥ
								нинь	nin	nin	ㄋㄧㄣ	линь	lin	lin	ㄌㄧㄣ
до	duo	to	ㄉㄨㄛ	то	tuo	tʻo	ㄊㄨㄛ	но	nuo	no	ㄋㄨㄛ	ло	luo / lo	lo	ㄌㄨㄛ / ㄌㄛ
доу	dou	tou	ㄉㄡ	тоу	tou	tʻou	ㄊㄡ	ноу	nou	nou	ㄋㄡ	лоу	lou	lou	ㄌㄡ
ду	du	tu	ㄉㄨ	ту	tu	tʻu	ㄊㄨ	ну	nu	nu	ㄋㄨ	лу	lu	lu	ㄌㄨ
дуань	duan	tuan	ㄉㄨㄢ	туань	tuan	tʻuan	ㄊㄨㄢ	нуань	nuan	nuan	ㄋㄨㄢ	луань	luan	luan	ㄌㄨㄢ
дуй	dui	tui	ㄉㄨㄟ	туй	tui	tʻui	ㄊㄨㄟ								
дун	dong	tung	ㄉㄨㄥ	тун	tong	tʻung	ㄊㄨㄥ	нун	nong	nung	ㄋㄨㄥ	лун	long	lung	ㄌㄨㄥ
дунь	dun	tun	ㄉㄨㄣ	тунь	tun	tʻun	ㄊㄨㄣ					лунь	lun	lun	ㄌㄨㄣ
дэ	de	tê	ㄉㄜ	тэ	te	tʻê	ㄊㄜ	нэ	ne	nê	ㄋㄜ	лэ	le	lê	ㄌㄜ
дэй	dei	tei	ㄉㄟ					нэй	nei	nei	ㄋㄟ	лэй	lei	lei	ㄌㄟ
дэн	deng	têng	ㄉㄥ	тэн	teng	tʻêng	ㄊㄥ	нэн	neng	nêng	ㄋㄥ	лэн	leng	lêng	ㄌㄥ
дэнь	den	tên	ㄉㄣ					нэнь	nen	nên	ㄋㄣ				
дю	diu	tiu	ㄉㄧㄡ					ню	niu	niu	ㄋㄧㄡ	лю	liu	liu	ㄌㄧㄡ
								нюй	nü	nü	ㄋㄩ	люй	lü	lü	ㄌㄩ
								нюэ	nüe	nüeh	ㄋㄩㄝ	люэ	lüe	lüeh	ㄌㄩㄝ
дя	dia	tia	ㄉㄧㄚ					ня	nia	nia	ㄋㄧㄚ	ля	lia	lia	ㄌㄧㄚ
дян	diang	tiang	ㄉㄧㄤ					нян	niang	niang	ㄋㄧㄤ	лян	liang	liang	ㄌㄧㄤ
дянь	dian	tien	ㄉㄧㄢ	тянь	tian	tʻien	ㄊㄧㄢ	нянь	nian	nien	ㄋㄧㄢ	лянь	lian	lien	ㄌㄧㄢ
дяо	diao	tiao	ㄉㄧㄠ	тяо	tiao	tʻiao	ㄊㄧㄠ	няо	niao	niao	ㄋㄧㄠ	ляо	liao	liao	ㄌㄧㄠ
Г / G				К / K				Х / H							
Cyrillic	Pinyin	WG	MPS	Cyrillic	Pinyin	WG	MPS	Cyrillic	Pinyin	WG	MPS				
га	ga	ka	ㄍㄚ	ка	ka	kʻa	ㄎㄚ	ха	ha	ha	ㄏㄚ				
гай	gai	kai	ㄍㄞ	кай	kai	kʻai	ㄎㄞ	хай	hai	hai	ㄏㄞ				
ган	gang	kang	ㄍㄤ	кан	kang	kʻang	ㄎㄤ	хан	hang	hang	ㄏㄤ				
гань	gan	kan	ㄍㄢ	кань	kan	kʻan	ㄎㄢ	хань	han	han	ㄏㄢ				
гао	gao	kao	ㄍㄠ	као	kao	kʻao	ㄎㄠ	хао	hao	hao	ㄏㄠ				
								хм	hm	hm	ㄏㆬ				
								хнг	hng	hng	ㄏㄯ				
го	guo	kuo	ㄍㄨㄛ	ко	kuo	kʻuo	ㄎㄨㄛ	хо	huo	huo	ㄏㄨㄛ				
гоу	gou	kou	ㄍㄡ	коу	kou	kʻou	ㄎㄡ	хоу	hou	hou	ㄏㄡ				
гу	gu	ku	ㄍㄨ	ку	ku	kʻu	ㄎㄨ	ху	hu	hu	ㄏㄨ				
гуа	gua	kua	ㄍㄨㄚ	куа	kua	kʻua	ㄎㄨㄚ	хуа	hua	hua	ㄏㄨㄚ				
гуай	guai	kuai	ㄍㄨㄞ	куай	kuai	kʻuai	ㄎㄨㄞ	хуай	huai	huai	ㄏㄨㄞ				
гуан	guang	kuang	ㄍㄨㄤ	куан	kuang	kʻuang	ㄎㄨㄤ	хуан	huang	huang	ㄏㄨㄤ				
гуань	guan	kuan	ㄍㄨㄢ	куань	kuan	kʻuan	ㄎㄨㄢ	хуань	huan	huan	ㄏㄨㄢ				
гуй	gui	kuei	ㄍㄨㄟ	куй	kui	kʻuei	ㄎㄨㄟ	хун	hong	hung	ㄏㄨㄥ				
гун	gong	kung	ㄍㄨㄥ	кун	kong	kʻung	ㄎㄨㄥ	хунь	hun	hun	ㄏㄨㄣ				
гунь	gun	kun	ㄍㄨㄣ	кунь	kun	kʻun	ㄎㄨㄣ	хуэй	hui	hui	ㄏㄨㄟ				
гэ	ge	ko	ㄍㄜ	кэ	ke	kʻo	ㄎㄜ	хэ	he	ho	ㄏㄜ				
гэй	gei	kei	ㄍㄟ	кэй	kei	kʻei	ㄎㄟ	хэй	hei	hei	ㄏㄟ				
гэн	geng	kêng	ㄍㄥ	кэн	keng	kʻêng	ㄎㄥ	хэн	heng	hêng	ㄏㄥ				
гэнь	gen	kên	ㄍㄣ	кэнь	ken	kʻên	ㄎㄣ	хэнь	hen	hên	ㄏㄣ				
ЦЗ / J				Ц / Q				С / X							
Cyrillic	Pinyin	WG	MPS	Cyrillic	Pinyin	WG	MPS	Cyrillic	Pinyin	WG	MPS				
цзе	jie	chieh	ㄐㄧㄝ	це	qie	chʻieh	ㄑㄧㄝ	се	xie	hsieh	ㄒㄧㄝ				
цзи	ji	chi	ㄐㄧ	ци	qi	chʻi	ㄑㄧ	си	xi	hsi	ㄒㄧ				
цзин	jing	ching	ㄐㄧㄥ	цин	qing	chʻing	ㄑㄧㄥ	син	xing	hsing	ㄒㄧㄥ				
цзинь	jin	chin	ㄐㄧㄣ	цинь	qin	chʻin	ㄑㄧㄣ	синь	xin	hsin	ㄒㄧㄣ				
цзю	jiu	chiu	ㄐㄧㄡ	цю	qiu	chʻiu	ㄑㄧㄡ	сю	xiu	hsiu	ㄒㄧㄡ				
цзюань	juan	chüan	ㄐㄩㄢ	цюань	quan	chʻüan	ㄑㄩㄢ	сюань	xuan	hsüan	ㄒㄩㄢ				
цзюй	ju	chü	ㄐㄩ	цюй	qu	chʻü	ㄑㄩ	сюй	xu	hsü	ㄒㄩ				
цзюн	jiong	chiung	ㄐㄩㄥ	цюн	qiong	chʻiung	ㄑㄩㄥ	сюн	xiong	hsiung	ㄒㄩㄥ				
цзюнь	jun	chün	ㄐㄩㄣ	цюнь	qun	chʻün	ㄑㄩㄣ	сюнь	xun	hsün	ㄒㄩㄣ				
цзюэ	jue	chüeh	ㄐㄩㄝ	цюэ	que	chʻüeh	ㄑㄩㄝ	сюэ	xue	hsüeh	ㄒㄩㄝ				
цзя	jia	chia	ㄐㄧㄚ	ця	qia	chʻia	ㄑㄧㄚ	ся	xia	hsia	ㄒㄧㄚ				
цзян	jiang	chiang	ㄐㄧㄤ	цян	qiang	chʻiang	ㄑㄧㄤ	сян	xiang	hsiang	ㄒㄧㄤ				
цзянь	jian	chien	ㄐㄧㄢ	цянь	qian	chʻien	ㄑㄧㄢ	сянь	xian	hsien	ㄒㄧㄢ				
цзяо	jiao	chiao	ㄐㄧㄠ	цяо	qiao	chʻiao	ㄑㄧㄠ	сяо	xiao	hsiao	ㄒㄧㄠ				
ЧЖ / ZH				Ч / CH				Ш / SH				Ж / R			
Cyrillic	Pinyin	WG	MPS	Cyrillic	Pinyin	WG	MPS	Cyrillic	Pinyin	WG	MPS	Cyrillic	Pinyin	WG	MPS
чжа	zha	cha	ㄓㄚ	ча	cha	chʻa	ㄔㄚ	ша	sha	sha	ㄕㄚ				
чжай	zhai	chai	ㄓㄞ	чай	chai	chʻai	ㄔㄞ	шай	shai	shai	ㄕㄞ				
чжан	zhang	chang	ㄓㄤ	чан	chang	chʻang	ㄔㄤ	шан	shang	shang	ㄕㄤ	жан	rang	jang	ㄖㄤ
чжань	zhan	chan	ㄓㄢ	чань	chan	chʻan	ㄔㄢ	шань	shan	shan	ㄕㄢ	жань	ran	jan	ㄖㄢ
чжао	zhao	chao	ㄓㄠ	чао	chao	chʻao	ㄔㄠ	шао	shao	shao	ㄕㄠ	жао	rao	jao	ㄖㄠ
чжи	zhi	chih	ㄓ	чи	chi	chʻih	ㄔ	ши	shi	shih	ㄕ	жи	ri	jih	ㄖ
чжо	zhuo	cho	ㄓㄨㄛ	чо	chuo	chʻo	ㄔㄨㄛ	шо	shuo	shuo	ㄕㄨㄛ	жо	ruo	jo	ㄖㄨㄛ
чжоу	zhou	chou	ㄓㄡ	чоу	chou	chʻou	ㄔㄡ	шоу	shou	shou	ㄕㄡ	жоу	rou	jou	ㄖㄡ
чжу	zhu	chu	ㄓㄨ	чу	chu	chʻu	ㄔㄨ	шу	shu	shu	ㄕㄨ	жу	ru	ju	ㄖㄨ
чжуа	zhua	chua	ㄓㄨㄚ	чуа	chua	chʻua	ㄔㄨㄚ	шуа	shua	shua	ㄕㄨㄚ	жуа	rua	jua	ㄖㄨㄚ
чжуай	zhuai	chuai	ㄓㄨㄞ	чуай	chuai	chʻuai	ㄔㄨㄞ	шуай	shuai	shuai	ㄕㄨㄞ				
чжуан	zhuang	chuang	ㄓㄨㄤ	чуан	chuang	chʻuang	ㄔㄨㄤ	шуан	shuang	shuang	ㄕㄨㄤ				
чжуань	zhuan	chuan	ㄓㄨㄢ	чуань	chuan	chʻuan	ㄔㄨㄢ	шуань	shuan	shuan	ㄕㄨㄢ	жуань	ruan	juan	ㄖㄨㄢ
чжуй	zhui	chui	ㄓㄨㄟ	чуй	chui	chʻui	ㄔㄨㄟ	шуй	shui	shui	ㄕㄨㄟ	жуй	rui	jui	ㄖㄨㄟ
чжун	zhong	chung	ㄓㄨㄥ	чун	chong	chʻung	ㄔㄨㄥ					жун	rong	jung	ㄖㄨㄥ
чжунь	zhun	chun	ㄓㄨㄣ	чунь	chun	chʻun	ㄔㄨㄣ	шунь	shun	shun	ㄕㄨㄣ	жунь	run	jun	ㄖㄨㄣ
чжэ	zhe	chê	ㄓㄜ	чэ	che	chʻê	ㄔㄜ	шэ	she	shê	ㄕㄜ	жэ	re	jê	ㄖㄜ
чжэй	zhei	chei	ㄓㄟ					шэй	shei	shei	ㄕㄟ				
чжэн	zheng	chêng	ㄓㄥ	чэн	cheng	chʻêng	ㄔㄥ	шэн	sheng	shêng	ㄕㄥ	жэн	reng	jêng	ㄖㄥ
чжэнь	zhen	chên	ㄓㄣ	чэнь	chen	chʻên	ㄔㄣ	шэнь	shen	shên	ㄕㄣ	жэнь	ren	jên	ㄖㄣ
ЦЗ / Z				Ц / C				С / S							
Cyrillic	Pinyin	WG	MPS	Cyrillic	Pinyin	WG	MPS	Cyrillic	Pinyin	WG	MPS				
цза	za	tsa	ㄗㄚ	ца	ca	tsʻa	ㄘㄚ	са	sa	sa	ㄙㄚ				
цзай	zai	tsai	ㄗㄞ	цай	cai	tsʻai	ㄘㄞ	сай	sai	sai	ㄙㄞ				
цзан	zang	tsang	ㄗㄤ	цан	cang	tsʻang	ㄘㄤ	сан	sang	sang	ㄙㄤ				
цзань	zan	tsan	ㄗㄢ	цань	can	tsʻan	ㄘㄢ	сань	san	san	ㄙㄢ				
цзао	zao	tsao	ㄗㄠ	цао	cao	tsʻao	ㄘㄠ	сао	sao	sao	ㄙㄠ				
цзо	zuo	tso	ㄗㄨㄛ	цо	cuo	tsʻo	ㄘㄨㄛ	со	suo	so	ㄙㄨㄛ				
цзоу	zou	tsou	ㄗㄡ	цоу	cou	tsʻou	ㄘㄡ	соу	sou	sou	ㄙㄡ				
цзу	zu	tsu	ㄗㄨ	цу	cu	tsʻu	ㄘㄨ	су	su	su	ㄙㄨ				
цзуань	zuan	tsuan	ㄗㄨㄢ	цуань	cuan	tsʻuan	ㄘㄨㄢ	суань	suan	suan	ㄙㄨㄢ				
цзуй	zui	tsui	ㄗㄨㄟ	цуй	cui	tsʻui	ㄘㄨㄟ	суй	sui	sui	ㄙㄨㄟ				
цзун	zong	tsung	ㄗㄨㄥ	цун	cong	tsʻung	ㄘㄨㄥ	сун	song	sung	ㄙㄨㄥ				
цзунь	zun	tsun	ㄗㄨㄣ	цунь	cun	tsʻun	ㄘㄨㄣ	сунь	sun	sun	ㄙㄨㄣ				
цзы	zi	tzŭ	ㄗ	цы	ci	tzʻŭ	ㄘ	сы	si	ssŭ	ㄙ				
цзэ	ze	tsê	ㄗㄜ	цэ	ce	tsʻê	ㄘㄜ	сэ	se	sê	ㄙㄜ				
цзэй	zei	tsei	ㄗㄟ												
цзэн	zeng	tsêng	ㄗㄥ	цэн	ceng	tsʻêng	ㄘㄥ	сэн	seng	sêng	ㄙㄥ				
цзэнь	zen	tsên	ㄗㄣ	цэнь	cen	tsʻên	ㄘㄣ	сэнь	sen	sên	ㄙㄣ				
Others
Cyrillic	Pinyin	WG	MPS	Cyrillic	Pinyin	WG	MPS	Cyrillic	Pinyin	WG	MPS	Cyrillic	Pinyin	WG	MPS
а	a	a	ㄚ	вэн	weng	wêng	ㄨㄥ	о	o	o	ㄛ	юань	yuan	yüan	ㄩㄢ
ай	ai	ai	ㄞ	вэнь	wen	wên	ㄨㄣ	оу	ou	ou	ㄡ	юй	yu	yü	ㄩ
ан	ang	ang	ㄤ	е	ye	yeh	ㄧㄝ	у	wu	wu	ㄨ	юн	yong	yung	ㄩㄥ
ань	an	an	ㄢ	ё	yo	yo	ㄧㄛ	э	e	ê / o	ㄜ	юнь	yun	yün	ㄩㄣ
ао	ao	ao	ㄠ	и	yi	i / yi	ㄧ	э̂	ê	eh	ㄝ	юэ	yue	yüeh	ㄩㄝ
ва	wa	wa	ㄨㄚ	ин	ying	ying	ㄧㄥ	эй	ei	ei	ㄟ	я	ya	ya	ㄧㄚ
вай	wai	wai	ㄨㄞ	инь	yin	yin	ㄧㄣ	эн	eng	êng	ㄥ	яй	yai	yai	ㄧㄞ
ван	wang	wang	ㄨㄤ	м	m	m	ㆬ	энь	en	ên	ㄣ	ян	yang	yang	ㄧㄤ
вань	wan	wan	ㄨㄢ	н	n	n	ㄯ	эр	er	êrh	ㄦ	янь	yan	yen	ㄧㄢ
во	wo	wo	ㄨㄛ	нг	ng	ng	ㆭ	ю	you	yu	ㄧㄡ	яо	yao	yao	ㄧㄠ
вэй	wei	wei	ㄨㄟ												

Note that the Palladius system does not distinguish between pinyin luo (as in 羅, luó) and the rare syllable lo (as in 咯, lo); both are written ло.

=== Exceptions ===
The names of the cities of Beijing and Nanjing are transcribed as Пекин (instead of Бэйцзин) and Нанкин (instead of Наньцзин), much as Peking and Nanking were still used in English-speaking countries until recently. Hong Kong (pinyin: Xiānggǎng) may be both Сянган (Xiānggǎng) and Гонконг (Hong Kong); the latter is more common.

In Russian borrowings from Chinese (such as place names), the syllable хуй (hui) is generally transcribed as хуэй (Huizu, Хуэйцзу) or occasionally хой (Anhui, Аньхой); this is because хуй is a taboo word for "penis" in Russian and several other Slavic languages. Dictionaries, however, may contain the unaltered spelling; as is found in Palladius' own dictionary from 1888, and Oshanin's Great Chinese–Russian Dictionary.

Older documents contain variants мэн — мын, мэнь — мынь, фэн — фын, фэнь — фынь, пэн — пын, hence Aomen (Macao) is traditionally spelled Аомынь in Russian. Most modern texts contain э, with some exceptions.

=== Pre-reform version ===
Prior to the reform of Russian orthography in 1918, the system differed in a few respects, as can be seen in Palladius's 1888 dictionary:

- ъ was used at the end of a word ending in a consonant, as was standard in pre-reform orthography.
- е → ѣ
- ё → іо
- эр → эрръ
- -юэ → -юе
- мэн, мэнь and фэн were written мынъ, мынь and фынъ, respectively; this did not affect фэнь, however.

== Ukrainian system ==
=== Initials ===
		Bilabial		Labiodental	Alveolar		Retroflex		Alveolo-palatal	Velar
		Voiceless	Voiced	Voiceless	Voiceless	Voiced	Voiceless	Voiced	Voiceless	Voiceless
Nasal			м [m] m ㄇ m			н [n] n ㄋ n				
Plosive	Unaspirated	б [p] p ㄅ b			д [t] t ㄉ d					ґ [k] k ㄍ g
Plosive	Aspirated	п [pʰ] p' ㄆ p			т [tʰ] t' ㄊ t					к [kʰ] k' ㄎ k
Affricate	Unaspirated				цз [ts] ts ㄗ z		чж [ʈʂ] ch ㄓ zh		цз [tɕ] ch ㄐ j	
Affricate	Aspirated				ц [tsʰ] ts' ㄘ c		ч [ʈʂʰ] ch' ㄔ ch		ц [tɕʰ] ch' ㄑ q	
Fricative				ф [f] f ㄈ f	с [s] s ㄙ s		ш [ʂ] sh ㄕ sh	ж [ʐ] j ㄖ r	с [ɕ] hs ㄒ x	х [x] h ㄏ h
Lateral						л [l] l ㄌ l				

=== Finals ===
Nucleus		a					ə						∅
Coda		∅	i	u	n	ŋ	∅	i	u	n	ŋ	ɻ	∅
Medial	∅	a [a] ㄚ a	ай [ai̯] ai ㄞ ai	ao [au̯] ao ㄠ ao	ань [an] an ㄢ an	ан [aŋ] ang ㄤ ang	е [ɤ] ê/o ㄜ e	ей [ei̯] ei ㄟ ei	оу [ou̯] ou ㄡ ou	ень [ən] ên ㄣ en	ен [əŋ] êng ㄥ eng	ер [aɚ̯] êrh ㄦ er	і/и [ʅ/ɿ] ih/ŭ -i
Medial	i	я [i̯a] ia ㄧㄚ ia		яо [i̯au̯] iao ㄧㄠ iao	янь [i̯ɛn] ien ㄧㄢ ian	ян [i̯aŋ] iang ㄧㄤ iang	є [i̯e] ieh ㄧㄝ ie		ю [i̯ou̯] iu ㄧㄡ iu	їнь [in] in ㄧㄣ in	їн [iŋ] ing ㄧㄥ ing		ї [i] i ㄧ i
Medial	u	уа [u̯a] ua ㄨㄚ ua	уай [u̯ai̯] uai ㄨㄞ uai		уань [u̯an] uan ㄨㄢ uan	уан [u̯aŋ] uang ㄨㄤ uang	о [u̯o] o/uo ㄨㄛ uo	уй [u̯ei̯] ui ㄨㄟ ui		унь [u̯ən] un ㄨㄣ un	ун [ʊŋ] ung ㄨㄥ ong		у [u] u ㄨ u
Medial	y				юань [y̯ɛn] üan ㄩㄢ üan		юе [y̯e] üeh ㄩㄝ üe			юнь [yn] ün ㄩㄣ ün	юн [i̯ʊŋ] iung ㄩㄥ iong		юй [y] ü ㄩ ü

In composites, coda ng is transcribed н' when the following syllable starts with a vowel. For example, the names of the cities of Chang'an and Hengyang are transcribed as Чан'ань and Хен'ян.

In syllables with no initial, w is transcribed as в in all cases except wu, transcribed as у. For example, the names of the cities of Wuwei and Wanning are transcribed as Увей and Ваньнін.

=== Comparison chart ===
This table establishes correspondence between the Ukrainian Palladius system together with the two Romanization systems most commonly used in English-speaking countries: Pinyin and Wade–Giles.

Б / B				П / P				М / M				Ф / F			
Cyrillic	Pinyin	WG	MPS	Cyrillic	Pinyin	WG	MPS	Cyrillic	Pinyin	WG	MPS	Cyrillic	Pinyin	WG	MPS
ба	ba	pa	ㄅㄚ	па	pa	p'a	ㄆㄚ	ма	ma	ma	ㄇㄚ	фа	fa	fa	ㄈㄚ
бай	bai	pai	ㄅㄞ	пай	pai	p'ai	ㄆㄞ	май	mai	mai	ㄇㄞ				
бан	bang	pang	ㄅㄤ	пан	pang	p'ang	ㄆㄤ	ман	mang	mang	ㄇㄤ	фан	fang	fang	ㄈㄤ
бань	ban	pan	ㄅㄢ	пань	pan	p'an	ㄆㄢ	мань	man	man	ㄇㄢ	фань	fan	fan	ㄈㄢ
бао	bao	pao	ㄅㄠ	пао	pao	p'ao	ㄆㄠ	мао	mao	mao	ㄇㄠ				
бє	bie	pieh	ㄅㄧㄝ	пє	pie	p'ieh	ㄆㄧㄝ	мє	mie	mieh	ㄇㄧㄝ				
бі	bi	pi	ㄅㄧ	пі	pi	p'i	ㄆㄧ	мі	mi	mi	ㄇㄧ				
бін	bing	ping	ㄅㄧㄥ	пін	ping	p'ing	ㄆㄧㄥ	мін	ming	ming	ㄇㄧㄥ				
бінь	bin	pin	ㄅㄧㄣ	пінь	pin	p'in	ㄆㄧㄣ	мінь	min	min	ㄇㄧㄣ				
бо	bo	po	ㄅㄛ	по	po	p'o	ㄆㄛ	мо	mo	mo	ㄇㄛ	фо	fo	fo	ㄈㄛ
				поу	pou	p'ou	ㄆㄡ	моу	mou	mou	ㄇㄡ	фоу	fou	fou	ㄈㄡ
бу	bu	pu	ㄅㄨ	пу	pu	p'u	ㄆㄨ	му	mu	mu	ㄇㄨ	фу	fu	fu	ㄈㄨ
								ме	me	me	ㄇㄜ				
бей	bei	pei	ㄅㄟ	пей	pei	p'ei	ㄆㄟ	мей	mei	mei	ㄇㄟ	фей	fei	fei	ㄈㄟ
бен	beng	peng	ㄅㄥ	пен	peng	p'eng	ㄆㄥ	мен	meng	meng	ㄇㄥ	фен	feng	feng	ㄈㄥ
бень	ben	pen	ㄅㄣ	пень	pen	p'en	ㄆㄣ	мень	men	men	ㄇㄣ	фень	fen	fen	ㄈㄣ
								мю	miu	miu	ㄇㄧㄡ				
бянь	bian	pien	ㄅㄧㄢ	пянь	pian	p'ien	ㄆㄧㄢ	мянь	mian	mien	ㄇㄧㄢ				
бяо	biao	piao	ㄅㄧㄠ	пяо	piao	p'iao	ㄆㄧㄠ	мяо	miao	miao	ㄇㄧㄠ				
Д / D				Т / T				Н / N				Л / L			
Cyrillic	Pinyin	WG	MPS	Cyrillic	Pinyin	WG	MPS	Cyrillic	Pinyin	WG	MPS	Cyrillic	Pinyin	WG	MPS
да	da	ta	ㄉㄚ	та	ta	t'a	ㄊㄚ	на	na	na	ㄋㄚ	ла	la	la	ㄌㄚ
дай	dai	tai	ㄉㄞ	тай	tai	t'ai	ㄊㄞ	най	nai	nai	ㄋㄞ	лай	lai	lai	ㄌㄞ
дан	dang	tang	ㄉㄤ	тан	tang	t'ang	ㄊㄤ	нан	nang	nang	ㄋㄤ	лан	lang	lang	ㄌㄤ
дань	dan	tan	ㄉㄢ	тань	tan	t'an	ㄊㄢ	нань	nan	nan	ㄋㄢ	лань	lan	lan	ㄌㄢ
дао	dao	tao	ㄉㄠ	тао	tao	t'ao	ㄊㄠ	нао	nao	nao	ㄋㄠ	лао	lao	lao	ㄌㄠ
дє	die	tieh	ㄉㄧㄝ	тє	tie	t'ieh	ㄊㄧㄝ	нє	nie	nieh	ㄋㄧㄝ	лє	lie	lieh	ㄌㄧㄝ
ді	di	ti	ㄉㄧ	ті	ti	t'i	ㄊㄧ	ні	ni	ni	ㄋㄧ	лі	li	li	ㄌㄧ
дін	ding	ting	ㄉㄧㄥ	тін	ting	t'ing	ㄊㄧㄥ	нін	ning	ning	ㄋㄧㄥ	лін	ling	ling	ㄌㄧㄥ
								нінь	nin	nin	ㄋㄧㄣ	лінь	lin	lin	ㄌㄧㄣ
до	duo	to	ㄉㄨㄛ	то	tuo	t'o	ㄊㄨㄛ	но	nuo	no	ㄋㄨㄛ	ло	luo	lo	ㄌㄨㄛ
доу	dou	tou	ㄉㄡ	тоу	tou	t'ou	ㄊㄡ	ноу	nou	nou	ㄋㄡ	лоу	lou	lou	ㄌㄡ
ду	du	tu	ㄉㄨ	ту	tu	t'u	ㄊㄨ	ну	nu	nu	ㄋㄨ	лу	lu	lu	ㄌㄨ
дуань	duan	tuan	ㄉㄨㄢ	туань	tuan	t'uan	ㄊㄨㄢ	нуань	nuan	nuan	ㄋㄨㄢ	луань	luan	luan	ㄌㄨㄢ
дуй	dui	tui	ㄉㄨㄟ	туй	tui	t'ui	ㄊㄨㄟ								
дун	dong	tung	ㄉㄨㄥ	тун	tong	t'ung	ㄊㄨㄥ	нун	nong	nung	ㄋㄨㄥ	лун	long	lung	ㄌㄨㄥ
дунь	dun	tun	ㄉㄨㄣ	тунь	tun	t'un	ㄊㄨㄣ					лунь	lun	lun	ㄌㄨㄣ
де	de	tê	ㄉㄜ	те	te	t'ê	ㄊㄜ	не	ne	nê	ㄋㄜ	ле	le	lê	ㄌㄜ
дей	dei	tei	ㄉㄟ	тей	tei	t'ei	ㄊㄟ	ней	nei	nei	ㄋㄟ	лей	lei	lei	ㄌㄟ
ден	deng	teng	ㄉㄥ	тен	teng	t'eng	ㄊㄥ	нен	neng	neng	ㄋㄥ	лен	leng	leng	ㄌㄥ
день	den	ten	ㄉㄣ					нень	nen	nen	ㄋㄣ				
дю	diu	tiu	ㄉㄧㄡ					ню	niu	niu	ㄋㄧㄡ	лю	liu	liu	ㄌㄧㄡ
								нюй	nü	nü	ㄋㄩ	люй	lü	lü	ㄌㄩ
								нюе	nüe	nüeh	ㄋㄩㄝ	люе	lüe	lüeh	ㄌㄩㄝ
дя	dia	tia	ㄉㄧㄚ									ля	lia	lia	ㄌㄧㄚ
								нян	niang	niang	ㄋㄧㄤ	лян	liang	liang	ㄌㄧㄤ
дянь	dian	tien	ㄉㄧㄢ	тянь	tian	t'ien	ㄊㄧㄢ	нянь	nian	nien	ㄋㄧㄢ	лянь	lian	lien	ㄌㄧㄢ
дяо	diao	tiao	ㄉㄧㄠ	тяо	tiao	t'iao	ㄊㄧㄠ	няо	niao	niao	ㄋㄧㄠ	ляо	liao	liao	ㄌㄧㄠ
Ґ / G				К / K				Х / H							
Cyrillic	Pinyin	WG	MPS	Cyrillic	Pinyin	WG	MPS	Cyrillic	Pinyin	WG	MPS				
ґа	ga	ka	ㄍㄚ	ка	ka	k'a	ㄎㄚ	ха	ha	ha	ㄏㄚ				
ґай	gai	kai	ㄍㄞ	кай	kai	k'ai	ㄎㄞ	хай	hai	hai	ㄏㄞ				
ґан	gang	kang	ㄍㄤ	кан	kang	k'ang	ㄎㄤ	хан	hang	hang	ㄏㄤ				
ґань	gan	kan	ㄍㄢ	кань	kan	k'an	ㄎㄢ	хань	han	han	ㄏㄢ				
ґао	gao	kao	ㄍㄠ	као	kao	k'ao	ㄎㄠ	хао	hao	hao	ㄏㄠ				
ґо	guo	kuo	ㄍㄨㄛ	ко	kuo	k'uo	ㄎㄨㄛ	хо	huo	huo	ㄏㄨㄛ				
ґоу	gou	kou	ㄍㄡ	коу	kou	k'ou	ㄎㄡ	хоу	hou	hou	ㄏㄡ				
ґу	gu	ku	ㄍㄨ	ку	ku	k'u	ㄎㄨ	ху	hu	hu	ㄏㄨ				
ґуа	gua	kua	ㄍㄨㄚ	куа	kua	k'ua	ㄎㄨㄚ	хуа	hua	hua	ㄏㄨㄚ				
ґуай	guai	kuai	ㄍㄨㄞ	куай	kuai	k'uai	ㄎㄨㄞ	хуай	huai	huai	ㄏㄨㄞ				
ґуан	guang	kuang	ㄍㄨㄤ	куан	kuang	k'uang	ㄎㄨㄤ	хуан	huang	huang	ㄏㄨㄤ				
ґуань	guan	kuan	ㄍㄨㄢ	куань	kuan	k'uan	ㄎㄨㄢ	хуань	huan	huan	ㄏㄨㄢ				
ґуй	gui	kui	ㄍㄨㄟ	куй	kui	k'ui	ㄎㄨㄟ	хуей	hui	hui	ㄏㄨㄟ				
ґун	gong	kung	ㄍㄨㄥ	кун	kong	k'ung	ㄎㄨㄥ	хун	hong	hung	ㄏㄨㄥ				
ґунь	gun	kun	ㄍㄨㄣ	кунь	kun	k'un	ㄎㄨㄣ	хунь	hun	hun	ㄏㄨㄣ				
ґе	ge	ko	ㄍㄜ	ке	ke	k'o	ㄎㄜ	хе	he	ho	ㄏㄜ				
ґей	gei	kei	ㄍㄟ					хей	hei	hei	ㄏㄟ				
ґен	geng	keng	ㄍㄥ	кен	keng	k'eng	ㄎㄥ	хен	heng	heng	ㄏㄥ				
ґень	gen	ken	ㄍㄣ	кень	ken	k'en	ㄎㄣ	хень	hen	hen	ㄏㄣ				
ЦЗ / J				Ц / Q				С / X							
Cyrillic	Pinyin	WG	MPS	Cyrillic	Pinyin	WG	MPS	Cyrillic	Pinyin	WG	MPS				
цзє	jie	chieh	ㄐㄧㄝ	цє	qie	ch'ieh	ㄑㄧㄝ	сє	xie	hsieh	ㄒㄧㄝ				
цзі	ji	chi	ㄐㄧ	ці	qi	ch'i	ㄑㄧ	сі	xi	hsi	ㄒㄧ				
цзін	jing	ching	ㄐㄧㄥ	цін	qing	ch'ing	ㄑㄧㄥ	сін	xing	hsing	ㄒㄧㄥ				
цзінь	jin	chin	ㄐㄧㄣ	цінь	qin	ch'in	ㄑㄧㄣ	сінь	xin	hsin	ㄒㄧㄣ				
цзю	jiu	chiu	ㄐㄧㄡ	цю	qiu	ch'iu	ㄑㄧㄡ	сю	xiu	hsiu	ㄒㄧㄡ				
цзюань	juan	chüan	ㄐㄩㄢ	цюань	quan	ch'üan	ㄑㄩㄢ	сюань	xuan	hsüan	ㄒㄩㄢ				
цзюй	ju	chü	ㄐㄩ	цюй	qu	ch'ü	ㄑㄩ	сюй	xu	hsü	ㄒㄩ				
цзюн	jiong	chiung	ㄐㄩㄥ	цюн	qiong	ch'iung	ㄑㄩㄥ	сюн	xiong	hsiung	ㄒㄩㄥ				
цзюнь	jun	chün	ㄐㄩㄣ	цюнь	qun	ch'ün	ㄑㄩㄣ	сюнь	xun	hsün	ㄒㄩㄣ				
цзюе	jue	chüeh	ㄐㄩㄝ	цюе	que	ch'üeh	ㄑㄩㄝ	сюе	xue	hsüeh	ㄒㄩㄝ				
цзя	jia	chia	ㄐㄧㄚ	ця	qia	ch'ia	ㄑㄧㄚ	ся	xia	hsia	ㄒㄧㄚ				
цзян	jiang	chiang	ㄐㄧㄤ	цян	qiang	ch'iang	ㄑㄧㄤ	сян	xiang	hsiang	ㄒㄧㄤ				
цзянь	jian	chien	ㄐㄧㄢ	цянь	qian	ch'ien	ㄑㄧㄢ	сянь	xian	hsien	ㄒㄧㄢ				
цзяо	jiao	chiao	ㄐㄧㄠ	цяо	qiao	ch'iao	ㄑㄧㄠ	сяо	xiao	hsiao	ㄒㄧㄠ				
ЧЖ / ZH				Ч / CH				Ш / SH				Ж / R			
Cyrillic	Pinyin	WG	MPS	Cyrillic	Pinyin	WG	MPS	Cyrillic	Pinyin	WG	MPS	Cyrillic	Pinyin	WG	MPS
чжа	zha	cha	ㄓㄚ	ча	cha	ch'a	ㄔㄚ	ша	sha	sha	ㄕㄚ				
чжай	zhai	chai	ㄓㄞ	чай	chai	ch'ai	ㄔㄞ	шай	shai	shai	ㄕㄞ				
чжан	zhang	chang	ㄓㄤ	чан	chang	ch'ang	ㄔㄤ	шан	shang	shang	ㄕㄤ	жан	rang	jang	ㄖㄤ
чжань	zhan	chan	ㄓㄢ	чань	chan	ch'an	ㄔㄢ	шань	shan	shan	ㄕㄢ	жань	ran	jan	ㄖㄢ
чжао	zhao	chao	ㄓㄠ	чао	chao	ch'ao	ㄔㄠ	шао	shao	shao	ㄕㄠ	жао	rao	jao	ㄖㄠ
чжи	zhi	chih	ㄓ	чи	chi	ch'ih	ㄔ	ши	shi	shih	ㄕ	жи	ri	jih	ㄖ
чжо	zhuo	cho	ㄓㄨㄛ	чо	chuo	ch'o	ㄔㄨㄛ	шо	shuo	shuo	ㄕㄨㄛ	жо	ruo	jo	ㄖㄨㄛ
чжоу	zhou	chou	ㄓㄡ	чоу	chou	ch'ou	ㄔㄡ	шоу	shou	shou	ㄕㄡ	жоу	rou	jou	ㄖㄡ
чжу	zhu	chu	ㄓㄨ	чу	chu	ch'u	ㄔㄨ	шу	shu	shu	ㄕㄨ	жу	ru	ju	ㄖㄨ
чжуа	zhua	chua	ㄓㄨㄚ	чуа	chua	ch'ua	ㄔㄨㄚ	шуа	shua	shua	ㄕㄨㄚ	жуа	rua	jua	ㄖㄨㄚ
чжуай	zhuai	chuai	ㄓㄨㄞ	чуай	chuai	ch'uai	ㄔㄨㄞ	шуай	shuai	shuai	ㄕㄨㄞ				
чжуан	zhuang	chuang	ㄓㄨㄤ	чуан	chuang	ch'uang	ㄔㄨㄤ	шуан	shuang	shuang	ㄕㄨㄤ				
чжуань	zhuan	chuan	ㄓㄨㄢ	чуань	chuan	ch'uan	ㄔㄨㄢ	шуань	shuan	shuan	ㄕㄨㄢ	жуань	ruan	juan	ㄖㄨㄢ
чжуй	zhui	chui	ㄓㄨㄟ	чуй	chui	ch'ui	ㄔㄨㄟ	шуй	shui	shui	ㄕㄨㄟ	жуй	rui	jui	ㄖㄨㄟ
чжун	zhong	chung	ㄓㄨㄥ	чун	chong	ch'ung	ㄔㄨㄥ					жун	rong	jung	ㄖㄨㄥ
чжунь	zhun	chun	ㄓㄨㄣ	чунь	chun	ch'un	ㄔㄨㄣ	шунь	shun	shun	ㄕㄨㄣ	жунь	run	jun	ㄖㄨㄣ
чже	zhe	chê	ㄓㄜ	че	che	ch'ê	ㄔㄜ	ше	she	shê	ㄕㄜ	же	re	jê	ㄖㄜ
чжей	zhei	chei	ㄓㄟ					шей	shei	shei	ㄕㄟ				
чжен	zheng	cheng	ㄓㄥ	чен	cheng	ch'eng	ㄔㄥ	шен	sheng	sheng	ㄕㄥ	жен	reng	jeng	ㄖㄥ
чжень	zhen	chen	ㄓㄣ	чень	chen	ch'en	ㄔㄣ	шень	shen	shen	ㄕㄣ	жень	ren	jen	ㄖㄣ
ЦЗ / Z				Ц / C				С / S							
Cyrillic	Pinyin	WG	MPS	Cyrillic	Pinyin	WG	MPS	Cyrillic	Pinyin	WG	MPS				
цза	za	tsa	ㄗㄚ	ца	ca	ts'a	ㄘㄚ	са	sa	sa	ㄙㄚ				
цзай	zai	tsai	ㄗㄞ	цай	cai	ts'ai	ㄘㄞ	сай	sai	sai	ㄙㄞ				
цзан	zang	tsang	ㄗㄤ	цан	cang	ts'ang	ㄘㄤ	сан	sang	sang	ㄙㄤ				
цзань	zan	tsan	ㄗㄢ	цань	can	ts'an	ㄘㄢ	сань	san	san	ㄙㄢ				
цзао	zao	tsao	ㄗㄠ	цао	cao	ts'ao	ㄘㄠ	сао	sao	sao	ㄙㄠ				
цзо	zuo	tso	ㄗㄨㄛ	цо	cuo	ts'o	ㄘㄨㄛ	со	suo	so	ㄙㄨㄛ				
цзоу	zou	tsou	ㄗㄡ	цоу	cou	ts'ou	ㄘㄡ	соу	sou	sou	ㄙㄡ				
цзу	zu	tsu	ㄗㄨ	цу	cu	ts'u	ㄘㄨ	су	su	su	ㄙㄨ				
цзуань	zuan	tsuan	ㄗㄨㄢ	цуань	cuan	ts'uan	ㄘㄨㄢ	суань	suan	suan	ㄙㄨㄢ				
цзуй	zui	tsui	ㄗㄨㄟ	цуй	cui	ts'ui	ㄘㄨㄟ	суй	sui	sui	ㄙㄨㄟ				
цзун	zong	tsung	ㄗㄨㄥ	цун	cong	ts'ung	ㄘㄨㄥ	сун	song	sung	ㄙㄨㄥ				
цзунь	zun	tsun	ㄗㄨㄣ	цунь	cun	ts'un	ㄘㄨㄣ	сунь	sun	sun	ㄙㄨㄣ				
цзи	zi	tzu	ㄗ	ци	ci	tz'u	ㄘ	си	si	ssu	ㄙ				
цзе	ze	tsê	ㄗㄜ	це	ce	ts'ê	ㄘㄜ	се	se	sê	ㄙㄜ				
цзей	zei	tsei	ㄗㄟ												
цзен	zeng	tseng	ㄗㄥ	цен	ceng	ts'eng	ㄘㄥ	сен	seng	seng	ㄙㄥ				
цзень	zen	tsen	ㄗㄣ	цень	cen	ts'en	ㄘㄣ	сень	sen	sen	ㄙㄣ				
Others
Cyrillic	Pinyin	WG	MPS	Cyrillic	Pinyin	WG	MPS	Cyrillic	Pinyin	WG	MPS	Cyrillic	Pinyin	WG	MPS
а	a	a	ㄚ	во	wo	wo	ㄨㄛ	о	o	o	ㄛ	юй	yu	yü	ㄩ
ай	ai	ai	ㄞ	вей	wei	wei	ㄨㄟ	оу	ou	ou	ㄡ	юн	yong	yung	ㄩㄥ
ан	ang	ang	ㄤ	вен	weng	weng	ㄨㄥ	у	wu	wu	ㄨ	юнь	yun	yün	ㄩㄣ
ань	an	an	ㄢ	вень	wen	wen	ㄨㄣ	е	e	ê	ㄜ	юе	yue	yüeh	ㄩㄝ
ао	ao	ao	ㄠ	є	ye	yeh	ㄧㄝ	ей	ei	ei	ㄟ	я	ya	ya	ㄧㄚ
ва	wa	wa	ㄨㄚ	йо	yo	yo	ㄧㄛ	ень	en	en	ㄣ	яй	yai	yai	ㄧㄞ
вай	wai	wai	ㄨㄞ	ї	yi	i	ㄧ	ер	er	êrh	ㄦ	ян	yang	yang	ㄧㄤ
ван	wang	wang	ㄨㄤ	їн	ying	ing	ㄧㄥ	ю	you	yu	ㄧㄡ	янь	yan	yen	ㄧㄢ
вань	wan	wan	ㄨㄢ	їнь	yin	in	ㄧㄣ	юань	yuan	yüan	ㄩㄢ	яо	yao	yao	ㄧㄠ

Cyrillization with the Ukrainian alphabet differs from the Russian as follows:

- е → є
- ё → йо
- э → е
- г → ґ
- и → і
  - in жи, чжи, чи, ши (ri, zhi, chi, shi) still и is used
  - Syllables without initial consonant start with ї (yi, yin, ying → ї, їнь, їн).
- ы → и
- ъ → ' (apostrophe)

== Belarusian system ==
Cyrillization with the Belarusian alphabet differs from the Russian as follows:

- ао, яо → аа, яа (in accordance with Belarusian akanye)
- и → і
  - in ri, zhi, chi, shi there is ы (жы, чжы, чы, шы).
- ъ → ' (apostrophe)

== Serbian Cyrillic system ==
The Serbian Cyrillic system for Serbo-Croatian is rather different from the Russian: for example, j, q, zh are transcribed as ђ, ћ, џ; the Serbian letters ј, љ, њ appear where the Russian system uses я, е, ю, й; final n and ng are н and нг.

== Macedonian system ==
=== Initials ===
		Bilabial		Labiodental	Alveolar		Retroflex		Alveolo-palatal	Velar
		Voiceless	Voiced	Voiceless	Voiceless	Voiced	Voiceless	Voiced	Voiceless	Voiceless
Nasal			м [m] m ㄇ m			н [n] n ㄋ n				
Plosive	Unaspirated	б [p] p ㄅ b			д [t] t ㄉ d					г [k] k ㄍ g
Plosive	Aspirated	п [pʰ] p' ㄆ p			т [tʰ] t' ㄊ t					к [kʰ] k' ㄎ k
Affricate	Unaspirated				ѕ [ts] ts ㄗ z		џ [ʈʂ] ch ㄓ zh		џј [tɕ] ch ㄐ j	
Affricate	Aspirated				ц [tsʰ] ts' ㄘ c		ч [ʈʂʰ] ch' ㄔ ch		чј [tɕʰ] ch' ㄑ q	
Fricative				ф [f] f ㄈ f	с [s] s ㄙ s		ш [ʂ] sh ㄕ sh	ж [ʐ] j ㄖ r	шј [ɕ] hs ㄒ x	х [x] h ㄏ h
Lateral						л [l] l ㄌ l				

=== Finals ===
Nucleus		a					ə						∅
Coda		∅	i	u	n	ŋ	∅	i	u	n	ŋ	ɻ	∅
Medial	∅	a [a] ㄚ a	аи [ai̯] ai ㄞ ai	ao [au̯] ao ㄠ ao	ан [an] an ㄢ an	анг [aŋ] ang ㄤ ang	е [ɤ] ê/o ㄜ e	еи [ei̯] ei ㄟ ei	оу [ou̯] ou ㄡ ou	ен [ən] ên ㄣ en	енг [əŋ] êng ㄥ eng	ер [aɚ̯] êrh ㄦ er	и [ʅ/ɿ] ih/ŭ -i
Medial	i	иа [i̯a] ia ㄧㄚ ia		иао [i̯au̯] iao ㄧㄠ iao	иан [i̯ɛn] ien ㄧㄢ ian	ианг [i̯aŋ] iang ㄧㄤ iang	ие [i̯e] ieh ㄧㄝ ie		иу [i̯ou̯] iu ㄧㄡ iu	ин [in] in ㄧㄣ in	инг [iŋ] ing ㄧㄥ ing		и [i] i ㄧ i
Medial	u	уа [u̯a] ua ㄨㄚ ua	уаи [u̯ai̯] uai ㄨㄞ uai		уан [u̯an] uan ㄨㄢ uan	уанг [u̯aŋ] uang ㄨㄤ uang	о/уо [u̯o] o/uo ㄨㄛ uo	уи [u̯ei̯] ui ㄨㄟ ui		ун [u̯ən] un ㄨㄣ un	унг [ʊŋ] ung ㄨㄥ ong		у [u] u ㄨ u
Medial	y				уан [y̯ɛn] üan ㄩㄢ üan		уе [y̯e] üeh ㄩㄝ üe			ун [yn] ün ㄩㄣ ün	иунг [i̯ʊŋ] iung ㄩㄥ iong		у [y] ü ㄩ ü

W- and y- are transcribed as в- and ј-.

== Table of cyrillization systems ==
Systems of cyrillization of Chinese
Pinyin	Russian (Palladius)	Ukrainian		Bulgarian	Serbian
Pinyin	Russian (Palladius)	Academic (Palladius-based)	Alternative (proposed by N. Kirnosova and N. Tsisar)	Bulgarian	Serbian
A — А
a	а	а	а	а	а
ai	ай	ай	ай	ай	ај
an	ань	ань	ань	ан	ан
ang	ан	ан	ан	ан	анг
ao	ао	ао	ао	ао	ао
B — Б
ba	ба	ба	ба	ба	ба
bai	бай	бай	бай	бай	бај
ban	бань	бань	бань	бан	бан
bang	бан	бан	бан	бан	банг
bao	бао	бао	бао	бао	бао
bei	бэй	бей	бей	бей	беј
ben	бэнь	бень	бень	бън	бан
beng	бэн	бен	бен	бън	бенг
bi	би	бі	бі	би	би
bian	бянь	бянь	б’янь	биен	бјен
biao	бяо	бяо	б’яо	бяо	бјао
bie	бе	бє	б'є	бие	бје
bin	бинь	бінь	бінь	бин	бин
bing	бин	бін	бін	бин	бинг
bo	бо	бо	бо	бо	бо
bu	бу	бу	бу	бу	бу
C — Ц
ca	ца	ца	ца	ца	ца
cai	цай	цай	цай	цай	цај
can	цань	цань	цань	цан	цан
cang	цан	цан	цан	цан	цанг
cao	цао	цао	цао	цао	цао
ce	цэ	це	це	цъ	це
cen	цэнь	цень	цень	цън	цен
ceng	цэн	цен	цен	цън	ценг
ci	цы	ци	ци	цъ	ци
cong	цун	цун	цон	цун	цунг
cou	цоу	цоу	цов	цоу	цоу
cu	цу	цу	цу	цу	цу
cuan	цуань	цуань	цвань	цуан	цуан
cui	цуй	цуй	цвей	цуей	цуеј
cun	цунь	цунь	цвень	цун	цуен
cuo	цо	цо	цво	цуо	цуо
CH — Ч
cha	ча	ча	ча	ча	ча
chai	чай	чай	чай	чай	чај
chan	чань	чань	чань	чан	чан
chang	чан	чан	чан	чан	чанг
chao	чао	чао	чао	чао	чао
che	чэ	че	че	чъ	че
chen	чэнь	чень	чень	чън	чен
cheng	чэн	чен	чен	чън	ченг
chi	чи	чи	чи	чъ	чи
chong	чун	чун	чон	чун	чунг
chou	чоу	чоу	чов	чоу	чоу
chu	чу	чу	чу	чу	чу
chua	чуа	чуа	чва	чуа	чуа
chuai	чуай	чуай	чвай	чуай	чуај
chuan	чуань	чуань	чвань	чуан	чуан
chuang	чуан	чуан	чван	чуан	чуанг
chui	чуй	чуй	чвей	чуей	чуеј
chun	чунь	чунь	чвень	чун	чуен
chuo	чо	чо	чво	чуо	чуо
D — Д
da	да	да	да	да	да
dai	дай	дай	дай	дай	дај
dan	дань	дань	дань	дан	дан
dang	дан	дан	дан	дан	данг
dao	дао	дао	дао	дао	дао
de	дэ	де	де	дъ	де
dei	дэй	дей	дей	дей	деј
den	дэнь	день	день	дън	ден
deng	дэн	ден	ден	дън	денг
di	ди	ді	ді	ди	ди
dia	дя	дя	дя	дя	дја
dian	дянь	дянь	дянь	диен	дјен
diang	дян	дян	дян	дян	дјанг
diao	дяо	дяо	дяо	дяо	дјао
die	де	дє	дє	дие	дје
ding	дин	дін	дін	дин	динг
diu	дю	дю	дьов	диу	дју
dong	дун	дун	дон	дун	дунг
dou	доу	доу	дов	доу	доу
du	ду	ду	ду	ду	ду
duan	дуань	дуань	двань	дуан	дуан
dui	дуй	дуй	двей	дуей	дуеј
dun	дунь	дунь	двень	дун	дуен
duo	до	до	дво	дуо	дуо
E — Э / Е / Ъ
e	э	е	е	ъ	е
ei	эй	ей	ей	ей	еј
en	энь	ень	ень	ън	ен
eng	эн	ен	ен	ън	енг
er	эр	ер	ер	ър	ер
F — Ф
fa	фа	фа	фа	фа	фа
fan	фань	фань	фань	фан	фан
fang	фан	фан	фан	фан	фанг
fei	фэй	фей	фей	фей	феј
fen	фэнь (фынь)	фень	фень	фън	фен
feng	фэн (фын)	фен	фен	фън	фенг
fiao	фяо	фяо	ф’яо	фяо	фјао
fo	фо	фо	фо	фо	фо
fou	фоу	фоу	фов	фоу	фоу
fu	фу	фу	фу	фу	фу
G — Г / Ґ
ga	га	ґа	ґа	га	га
gai	гай	ґай	ґай	гай	гај
gan	гань	ґань	ґань	ган	ган
gang	ган	ґан	ґан	ган	ганг
gao	гао	ґао	ґао	гао	гао
ge	гэ	ґе	ґе	гъ	ге
gei	гэй	ґей	ґей	гей	геј
gen	гэнь	ґень	ґень	гън	ген
geng	гэн	ґен	ґен	гън	генг
gong	гун	ґун	ґон	гун	гунг
gou	гоу	ґоу	ґов	гоу	гоу
gu	гу	ґу	ґу	гу	гу
gua	гуа	ґуа	ґва	гуа	гуа
guai	гуай	ґуай	ґвай	гуай	гуај
guan	гуань	ґуань	ґвань	гуан	гуан
guang	гуан	ґуан	ґван	гуан	гуанг
gui	гуй	ґуй	ґвей	гуей	гуеј
gun	гунь	ґунь	ґвень	гун	гуен
guo	го	ґо	ґво	гуо	гуо
H — Х
ha	ха	ха	ха	ха	ха
hai	хай	хай	хай	хай	хај
han	хань	хань	хань	хан	хан
hang	хан	хан	хан	хан	ханг
hao	хао	хао	хао	хао	хао
he	хэ	хе	хе	хъ	хе
hei	хэй	хей	хей	хъй	хеј
hen	хэнь	хень	хень	хън	хен
heng	хэн	хен	хен	хън	хенг
hm	хм	хм	гм	хм	хм
hng	хн	хн	гм	хн	хнг
hong	хун	хун	хон	хун	хунг
hou	хоу	хоу	хов	хоу	хоу
hu	ху	ху	ху	ху	ху
hua	хуа	хуа	хва	хуа	хуа
huai	хуай	хуай	хвай	хуай	хуај
huan	хуань	хуань	хвань	хуан	хуан
huang	хуан	хуан	хван	хуан	хуанг
hui	хуй	хуей	хвей	хуей	хуеј
hun	хунь	хунь	хвень	хун	хуен
huo	хо	хо	хво	хуо	хуо
J — ЦЗЬ / ДЗЬ / Ђ
ji	цзи	цзі	дзі	дзи	ђи
jia	цзя	цзя	дзя	дзя	ђа
jian	цзянь	цзянь	дзянь	дзиен	ђен
jiang	цзян	цзян	дзян	дзян	ђанг
jiao	цзяо	цзяо	дзяо	дзяо	ђао
jie	цзе	цзє	дзє	дзие	ђе
jin	цзинь	цзінь	дзінь	дзин	ђин
jing	цзин	цзін	дзін	дзин	ђинг
jiong	цзюн	цзюн	дзьон	дзиун	ђунг
jiu	цзю	цзю	дзьов	дзиу	ђу
ju	цзюй	цзюй	дзю	дзю	ђу
juan	цзюань	цзюань	дзюань	дзюен	ђуен
jue	цзюэ	цзюе	дзюе	дзюе	ђуе
jun	цзюнь	цзюнь	дзюнь	дзюн	ђуен
K — К
ka	ка	ка	ка	ка	ка
kai	кай	кай	кай	кай	кај
kan	кань	кань	кань	кан	кан
kang	кан	кан	кан	кан	канг
kao	као	као	као	као	као
ke	кэ	ке	ке	къ	ке
kei	кэй	кей	кей	кей	кеј
ken	кэнь	кень	кень	кън	кен
keng	кэн	кен	кен	кън	кенг
kong	кун	кун	кон	кун	кунг
kou	коу	коу	ков	коу	коу
ku	ку	ку	ку	ку	ку
kua	куа	куа	ква	куа	куа
kuai	куай	куай	квай	куай	куај
kuan	куань	куань	квань	куан	куан
kuang	куан	куан	кван	куан	куанг
kui	куй	куй	квей	куей	куеј
kun	кунь	кунь	квень	кун	куен
kuo	ко	ко	кво	куо	куо
L — Л / Љ
la	ла	ла	ла	ла	ла
lai	лай	лай	лай	лай	лај
lan	лань	лань	лань	лан	лан
lang	лан	лан	лан	лан	ланг
lao	лао	лао	лао	лао	лао
le	лэ	ле	ле	лъ	ле
lei	лэй	лей	лей	лей	леј
leng	лэн	лен	лен	лън	ленг
li	ли	лі	лі	ли	ли
lia	ля	ля	ля	ля	ља
lian	лянь	лянь	лянь	лиен	љен
liang	лян	лян	лян	лян	љанг
liao	ляо	ляо	ляо	ляо	љао
lie	ле	лє	лє	лие	ље
lin	линь	лінь	лінь	лин	лин
ling	лин	лін	лін	лин	линг
liu	лю	лю	льов	лиу	љу
lo	ло	ло	ло	ло	ло
long	лун	лун	лон	лун	лунг
lou	лоу	лоу	лов	лоу	лоу
lu	лу	лу	лу	лу	лу
luan	луань	луань	лвань	луан	луан
lun	лунь	лунь	лвень	лун	луен
luo	ло	ло	лво	луо	луо
lü	люй	люй	лю	лю	лу
lüan	люань	люань	люань	люен	луен
lüe	люэ	люе	люе	люе	луе
lün	люнь	люнь	люнь	люн	луен
M — М
m	м	м	м	м	м
ma	ма	ма	ма	ма	ма
mai	май	май	май	май	мај
man	мань	мань	мань	ман	ман
mang	ман	ман	ман	ман	манг
mao	мао	мао	мао	мао	мао
me	мэ	ме	ме	мъ	ме
mei	мэй	мей	мей	мей	меј
men	мэнь (мынь)	мень	мень	мън	мен
meng	мэн (мын)	мен	мен	мън	менг
mi	ми	мі	мі	ми	ми
mian	мянь	мянь	м’янь	миен	мјен
miao	мяо	мяо	м’яо	мяо	мјао
mie	ме	мє	м'є	мие	мје
min	минь	мінь	мінь	мин	мин
ming	мин	мін	мін	мин	минг
miu	мю	мю	мйов	миу	мју
mm	мм	мм	мм	мм	мм
mo	мо	мо	мо	мо	мо
mou	моу	моу	мов	моу	моу
mu	му	му	му	му	му
N — Н / Њ
n	нь	нь	нь	н	н
na	на	на	на	на	на
nai	най	най	най	най	нај
nan	нань	нань	нань	нан	нан
nang	нан	нан	нан	нан	нанг
nao	нао	нао	нао	нао	нао
ne	нэ	не	не	нъ	не
nei	нэй	ней	ней	ней	неј
nen	нэнь	нень	нень	нън	нен
neng	нэн	нен	нен	нън	ненг
ng	н	н	н	н	нг
ni	ни	ні	ні	ни	ни
nia	ня	ня	ня	ня	ња
nian	нянь	нянь	нянь	ниен	њен
niang	нян	нян	нян	нян	њанг
niao	няо	няо	няо	няо	њао
nie	не	нє	нє	ние	ње
nin	нинь	нінь	нінь	нин	нин
ning	нин	нін	нін	нин	нинг
niu	ню	ню	ньов	ниу	њу
nong	нун	нун	нон	нун	нунг
nou	ноу	ноу	нов	ноу	ноу
nu	ну	ну	ну	ну	ну
nun	нунь	нунь	нвень	нун	нуен
nuan	нуань	нуань	нвань	нуан	нуан
nuo	но	но	нво	нуо	нуо
nü	нюй	нюй	ню	ню	ну
nüe	нюэ	нюе	нюе	нюе	нуе
O — О
o	о	о	о	о	о
ou	оу	оу	ов	оу	оу
P — П
pa	па	па	па	па	па
pai	пай	пай	пай	пай	пај
pan	пань	пань	пань	пан	пан
pang	пан	пан	пан	пан	панг
pao	пао	пао	пао	пао	пао
pei	пэй	пей	пей	пай	пеј
pen	пэнь	пень	пень	пън	пен
peng	пэн	пен	пен	пън	пенг
pi	пи	пі	пі	пи	пи
pian	пянь	пянь	п’янь	пиен	пјен
piao	пяо	пяо	п’яо	пяо	пјао
pie	пе	пє	п'є	пие	пје
pin	пинь	пінь	пінь	пин	пин
ping	пин	пін	пін	пин	пинг
po	по	по	по	по	по
pou	поу	поу	пов	поу	поу
pu	пу	пу	пу	пу	пу
Q — ЦЬ / Ћ
qi	ци	ці	ці	ци	ћи
qia	ця	ця	ця	ця	ћа
qian	цянь	цянь	цянь	циен	ћен
qiang	цян	цян	цян	цян	ћанг
qiao	цяо	цяо	цяо	цяо	ћао
qie	це	цє	цє	цие	ће
qin	цинь	цінь	цінь	цин	ћин
qing	цин	цін	цін	цин	ћинг
qiong	цюн	цюн	цьон	циун	ћунг
qiu	цю	цю	цьов	циу	ћу
qu	цюй	цюй	цю	цю	ћу
quan	цюань	цюань	цюань	цюен	ћуен
que	цюэ	цюе	цюе	цюе	ћуе
qun	цюнь	цюнь	цюнь	цюн	ћуен
R — Ж
ran	жань	жань	жань	жан	жан
rang	жан	жан	жан	жан	жанг
rao	жао	жао	жао	жао	жао
re	жэ	же	же	жъ	же
ren	жэнь	жень	жень	жън	жен
reng	жэн	жен	жен	жън	женг
ri	жи	жи	жи	жъ	жи
rong	жун	жун	жон	жун	жунг
rou	жоу	жоу	жов	жоу	жоу
ru	жу	жу	жу	жу	жу
rua	жуа	жуа	жва	жуа	жуа
ruan	жуань	жуань	жвань	жуан	жуан
rui	жуй	жуй	жвей	жуей	жуеј
run	жунь	жунь	жвень	жун	жуен
ruo	жо	жо	жво	жуо	жуо
S — С
sa	са	са	са	са	са
sai	сай	сай	сай	сай	сај
san	сань	сань	сань	сан	сан
sang	сан	сан	сан	сан	санг
sao	сао	сао	сао	сао	сао
se	сэ	се	се	съ	се
sei	сэй	сей	сей	сей	сеј
sen	сэнь	сень	сень	сън	сен
seng	сэн	сен	сен	сън	сенг
si	сы	си	си	съ	си
song	сун	сун	сон	сун	сунг
sou	соу	соу	сов	соу	соу
su	су	су	су	су	су
suan	суань	суань	свань	суан	суан
sui	суй	суй	свей	суей	суеј
sun	сунь	сунь	свень	сун	суен
suo	со	со	сво	суо	суо
SH — Ш
sha	ша	ша	ша	ша	ша
shai	шай	шай	шай	шай	шај
shan	шань	шань	шань	шан	шан
shang	шан	шан	шан	шан	шанг
shao	шао	шао	шао	шао	шао
she	шэ	ше	ше	шъ	ше
shei	шэй	шей	шей	шей	шеј
shen	шэнь	шень	шень	шън	шен
sheng	шэн	шен	шен	шън	шенг
shi	ши	ши	ши	шъ	ши
shou	шоу	шоу	шов	шоу	шоу
shu	шу	шу	шу	шу	шу
shua	шуа	шуа	шва	шуа	шуа
shuai	шуай	шуай	швай	шуай	шуај
shuan	шуань	шуань	швань	шуан	шуан
shuang	шуан	шуан	шван	шуан	шуанг
shui	шуй	шуй	швей	шуей	шуеј
shun	шунь	шунь	швень	шун	шуен
shuo	шо	шо	шво	шуо	шуо
T — Т
ta	та	та	та	та	та
tai	тай	тай	тай	тай	тај
tan	тань	тань	тань	тан	тан
tang	тан	тан	тан	тан	танг
tao	тао	тао	тао	тао	тао
te	тэ	те	те	тъ	те
teng	тэн	тен	тен	тън	тенг
ti	ти	ті	ті	ти	ти
tian	тянь	тянь	тянь	тиен	тјен
tiao	тяо	тяо	тяо	тяо	тјао
tie	те	тє	тє	тие	тје
ting	тин	тін	тін	тин	тинг
tong	тун	тун	тон	тун	тунг
tou	тоу	тоу	тов	тоу	тоу
tu	ту	ту	ту	ту	ту
tuan	туань	туань	твань	туан	туан
tui	туй	туй	твей	туей	туеј
tun	тунь	тунь	твень	тун	туен
tuo	то	то	тво	туо	туо
W — В / У
wa	ва	ва	ва	уа	ва
wai	вай	вай	вай	уай	вај
wan	вань	вань	вань	уан	ван
wang	ван	ван	ван	уан	ванг
wei	вэй	вей	вей	уей	веј
wen	вэнь	вень	вень	уън	вен
weng	вэн	вен	вен	уън	венг
wo	во	во	во	уо	во
wu	у	у	ву	у	ву
X — СЬ
xi	си	сі	сі	си	си
xia	ся	ся	ся	ся	сја
xian	сянь	сянь	сянь	сиен	сјен
xiang	сян	сян	сян	сян	сјанг
xiao	сяо	сяо	сяо	сяо	сјао
xie	се	сє	сє	сие	сје
xin	синь	сінь	сінь	син	син
xing	син	сін	сін	син	синг
xiong	сюн	сюн	сьон	сиун	сјунг
xiu	сю	сю	сьов	сиу	сју
xu	сюй	сюй	сю	сю	сју
xuan	сюань	сюань	сюань	сюен	сјуен
xue	сюэ	сюе	сюе	сюе	сјуе
xun	сюнь	сюнь	сюнь	сюн	сјуен
Y — Й / Ј (Е, Є, И, Ї, Ю, Я)
ya	я	я	я	я	ја
yai	яй	яй	яй	яй	јај
yan	янь	янь	янь	йен	јен
yang	ян	ян	ян	ян	јанг
yao	яо	яо	яо	яо	јао
ye	е	є	є	йе	је
yi	и	ї	ї	и	ји
yin	инь	їнь	їнь	ин	јин
ying	ин	їн	їн	ин	јинг
yo	йо	йо	йо	йо	јо
yong	юн	юн	йон	юн	јунг
you	ю	ю	йов	йоу	јоу
yu	юй	юй	ю	ю	ју
yuan	юань	юань	юань	юен	јуен
yue	юэ	юе	юе	юе	јуе
yun	юнь	юнь	юнь	юн	јуен
Z — ЦЗ / ДЗ / Ц
za	цза	цза	дза	дза	ца
zai	цзай	цзай	дзай	дзай	цај
zan	цзань	цзань	дзань	дзан	цан
zang	цзан	цзан	дзан	дзан	цанг
zao	цзао	цзао	дзао	дзао	цао
ze	цзэ	цзе	дзе	дзъ	це
zei	цзэй	цзей	дзей	дзей	цеј
zen	цзэнь	цзень	дзень	дзън	цен
zeng	цзэн	цзен	дзен	дзън	ценг
zi	цзы	цзи	дзи	дзъ	ци
zong	цзун	цзун	дзон	дзун	цунг
zou	цзоу	цзоу	дзов	дзоу	цоу
zu	цзу	цзу	дзу	дзу	цу
zuan	цзуань	цзуань	дзвань	дзуан	цуан
zui	цзуй	цзуй	дзвей	дзуей	цуеј
zun	цзунь	цзунь	дзвень	дзун	цуен
zuo	цзо	цзо	дзво	дзуо	цуо
ZH — ЧЖ / ДЖ / Џ
zha	чжа	чжа	джа	джа	џа
zhai	чжай	чжай	джай	джай	џај
zhan	чжань	чжань	джань	джан	џан
zhang	чжан	чжан	джан	джан	џанг
zhao	чжао	чжао	джао	джао	џао
zhe	чжэ	чже	дже	джъ	џе
zhei	чжэй	чжей	джей	джей	џеј
zhen	чжэнь	чжень	джень	джън	џен
zheng	чжэн	чжен	джен	джън	џенг
zhi	чжи	чжи	джи	джъ	џи
zhong	чжун	чжун	джон	джун	џунг
zhou	чжоу	чжоу	джов	джоу	џоу
zhu	чжу	чжу	джу	джу	џу
zhua	чжуа	чжуа	джва	джуа	џуа
zhuai	чжуай	чжуай	джвай	джуай	џуај
zhuan	чжуань	чжуань	джвань	джуан	џуан
zhuang	чжуан	чжуан	джван	джуан	џуанг
zhui	чжуй	чжуй	джвей	джуей	џуеј
zhun	чжунь	чжунь	джвень	джун	џуен
zhuo	чжо	чжо	джво	джуо	џуо

== Sample texts ==
{Traditional:} 你 好 嗎？ 這個 是 一段 用 西里爾 字母 寫 的 中文。
{Simplified:} 你 好 吗？ 这个 是 一段 用 西里尔 字母 写 的 中文。
{Pinyin:} Nǐ hǎo ma? Zhège shì yīduàn yòng Xīlǐ'ěr zìmǔ xiě de Zhōngwén.
{Russian system:} Ни хао ма? Чжэгэ ши идуань юн {Сили эр} {цзы му} се дэ Чжунвэнь.
{Ukrainian system:} Ні хао ма? Чжеґе ши їдуань юн {Сілі ер} {цзи му} сє де Чжунвень.
{Belarusian system:} Ні хаа ма? Чжэгэ шы ідуань юн {Сілі эр} {цзы му} се дэ Чжунвэнь.
{Bulgarian system:} Ни хао ма? Джъгъ шъ идуан юн {Сили ер} {дзъ му} сие дъ Джунуън.
{Macedonian system:} Ни хао ма? Џеге ши јидуан јонг {Шјили ер} {ѕи му} шјие де Џонгвен.
{Serbian system:} Ни хао ма? Џеге ши идуан јунг {Сили ер} {ци му} сје де Џунгвен.
English translation: How are you? This is a Chinese sentence written in Cyrillic alphabet.

== See also ==
- Palladius table
- Polivanov system
- Kontsevich system
- Dungan language (alphabets)
- Taz language
- Romanization of Chinese
