= Beijing (disambiguation) =

Beijing, literally "northern capital" in Chinese, is the capital city of the People's Republic of China.

Beijing may also refer to:

== Historical capitals ==
- Taiyuan, formerly Běijīng or Běidū, capital city under the Tang Dynasty and Later Five Dynasties
- Daming County, formerly Beijing, capital under the Northern Song dynasty
- Ningcheng County, Inner Mongolia Autonomous Region, known as Beijing under the 12th-century Jurchen Jin dynasty

== Places in China ==
- Beijing Subdistrict, Guangzhou (北京街道), a subdistrict of Yuexiu District, Guangzhou, Guangdong
- Beijing, Guangxi (北景), a town in Dahua Yao Autonomous County, Guangxi
- Beijing Township (北景乡), a township in Linyi County, Shanxi

== Companies ==
- BAIC Group, which sells cars under the name Beijing
- BAIC Motor, which sells cars under the name Beijing
- BAW, which sells cars under the name Beijing

== Other uses ==
- Beijing (locomotive) or China Railways BJ, a diesel-hydraulic locomotive
- Beijing 1, a 1950s aircraft prototype
- Common metonym for the Government of China

== See also ==
- Historical capitals of China
- Peking (disambiguation)
- Pekin (disambiguation)
- Beijingese (disambiguation)
