= Palladius (Kafarov) =

Russian sinologist (1817–1878)

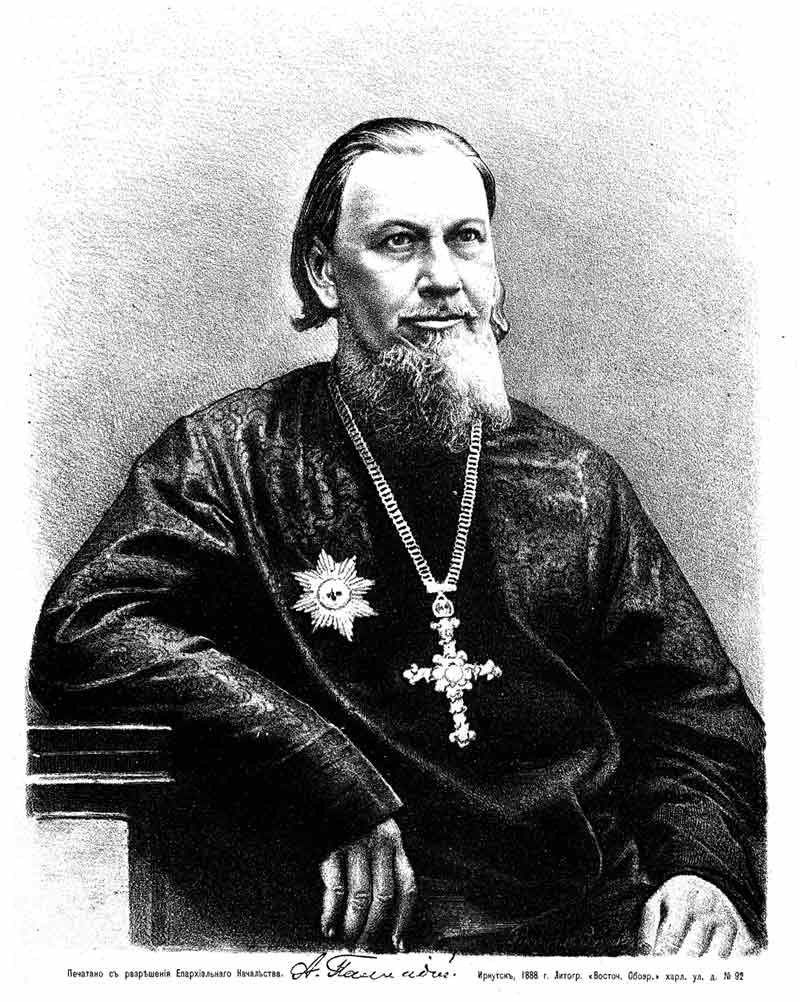
- Born: Pyotr Ivanovich Kafarov; September 29, 1817; Starosheshminsk, Chistopolsky Uyezd, Kazan Governorate, Russian Empire
- Died: December 18, 1878 (aged 61); Marsailles, France
- Known for: Sinology
- Notable work: Chinese-Russian Dictionary

Pyotr Ivanovich Kafarov (Note: Russian: Пётр Ива́нович Кафа́ров, pre-reform: Петръ Ива́новичъ Кафа́ровъ) (29 September 1817 – 18 December 1878), also known by his monastic name Palladius, (Note: Pre-reform Russian: Палла́дій; Modern Russian: Палла́дий) was an early Russian sinologist and Eastern Orthodox monk.

== Biography ==
Kafarov was born into the family of an Orthodox priest. He studied in Kazan seminary and Saint-Petersbourg Academy, from which he was sent to the Russian Orthodox Mission in China.

Like his teacher Hyacinth (Bichurin), Palladius was a Russian Orthodox monk. During his stay in China, he discovered and published many invaluable manuscripts, including The Secret History of the Mongols.

During his scholarly career, Kafarov's works focused on Chinese linguistics, history, geography, and religion. Kafarov notably translated many Buddhist scriptures from Chinese, Mongolian, and Tibetan. Kafarov also studied the history of Christianity in imperial China and helped pioneer the study of Chinese Islam.

For more than three decades, Archimandrite Palladius headed the Russian Orthodox mission in China and engaged in ethnographic and linguistic research there.

Kafarov designed a Cyrillization system for the Chinese language, known as the Palladius system. This system has remained the basis for official transcription of Chinese personal and geographical names in Russia ever since.

The Chinese-Russian Dictionary composed by Archimandrite Palladius remains a well-known work even today.

== Works ==
- 《漢俄合璧韻編》掌院修士巴第遺篇，1888年，北京同文舘 (Chinese-Russian Dictionary by Archimandrite Palladius, 1888, Tungwen Guan) Volume 1 Volume 2 1896 edition

== See also ==
- Cyrillization of Chinese
- «Elucidations of the Marco Polo’s Travels in North-China» («Journal of the North-China Branch of the R. As. Soc.», vol. X, 1876)
- «The Road from Beijing to Blagoveschinsk» (The Journal of the Royal Geographical Society of London, Volume 42, J. Murray, 1872)
