= Taz dialect =

Dialect of Northeastern Mandarin spoken in Russia

Taz
- Тазы хуаюй Tazi huayü Tazi huayuy 塔兹话语
- Native to: Russia
- Region: Russian Far East
- Ethnicity: 274 Taz people (2010 census)
- Native speakers: <10 (2019–2024)
- Language family: Sino-Tibetan: Sinitic; Chinese; Mandarin; Northeastern; Taz
- Writing system: Cyrillic (Palladius system); Chinese characters (obsolete)

Language codes
- ISO 639-3: –
- Glottolog: None

Taz is a dialect of Northeastern Mandarin spoken by the Taz people of the Russian Far East. There are a few loanwords from Tungusic languages, but no obvious Tungusic effect on the grammar.

Taz is largely mutually intelligible with Mandarin. In 1992, some Chinese bought Ginseng from the Taz. They spoke Standard Chinese and Taz, respectively, and could understand one other. What they did not understand were mainly names of places and social terms.

== History ==
The Taz are descendants of the intermarriage of Han Chinese immigrants and local Tungusic peoples. In the early to middle 19th century, Han Chinese from Northeast China moved to the Ussuri River basin and engaged in ginseng harvesting, fishing and hunting. The immigrants were mostly men, and they married the local Udege and Nanai peoples. Their language, while remaining completely Chinese grammatically, adopted some loan words from Nanai and Udege. There is a 400-word dictionary, but the language otherwise has no writing system and is a purely oral language. In 1880, the language was used by a thousand people. By the beginning of the 21st century, only a few elderly people still spoke it. The 2002 All-Russian Census recorded that all Taz people regarded Russian as their mother tongue. The 2010 census found 274 Taz people but no Taz speakers, so the Taz language is likely to be extinct.

== Phonology ==
Taz is a typical Northeastern Mandarin dialect. There is no retroflex series, but there is erhua. Words with an r initial of Standard Chinese (MSC) have an initial y in Taz, and some words with an initial f in MSC have an initial h in Taz. The MSC finals -ai and -ou are pronounced -ei and -u in Taz, whereas nasal finals are mostly realized as nasal vowels. Taz has the four lexical tones and the neutral tone of MSC and Northeast Mandarin. The yin ping tone (tone 1) is lower than in MSC, and yang ping (tone 2) 为降升调. The distinction between yang ping and shang tone (tone 3) is not obvious. The pitch drops at the end of a sentence, and can sound like a shang or qu tone.

== Vocabulary ==
The vocabulary is typical of Northeastern Mandarin, with such characteristic words as 俺們 for 'we', дэй3фань4 dei3fan4 for 'food' and 日頭 for 'sun'. There are a few loanwords from Tungusic languages, such as араки ar'aki 'wine', яцзига yajiga 'daughter' (Udege ajiga), etc. Исима yixima 'rainbow trout' may be from Oroch.

== Sample texts ==
Listed below are some Taz sentences. They are transcribed in standard Russian Cyrillicized Chinese.

цзиэр1гэ нао3хуъ.
jiērge nǎohu.
It's warm today.

цзоу4фан4лэ.
zòufànle.
Dinner's ready. lit., (it's) cooked

стакан ман2суй3 / гао2дуо1сао1суй3.
stakan mánsuǐ / gáoduōsāosuǐ.
The glass is full of water / ?How much water to put. (Russian: стакан stakan)

цзе4цяъ4 йи1хан ни3 цуань1дэ да4.
jièqià yīhan nǐ cuānde dà.
This dress is too big for you. lit., you're wearing it big

лян2цзя4 йин3 / лян2цзя4 йин3цзя
liángjià yǐn / liángjià yǐnjia
Two families.

во3 цзиэр4гэ цянь2 бу2дэгоу4 сы3хуаъ.
wǒ jièrge qián búdegòu sǐhua.
I don't have enough money today.

лэй2ба, цуанмэйр2ба.
léiba, cuangméirba.
Come, join us.

цзе1ли ци2лэ хуо2лэ.
jiēli qíle huóle.
There was a fire here.

ни2 дэй3цзяр4 лэй2 ганъ4 хан2ма. ни3 дан4 во3 гань4хуо2.
ní děijiàr léi gàn hánma. nǐ dàng wǒ gànhuó.
What are you doing here, you're interrupting my work.

== Bibliography ==
- Belikov, Vladimir and Elena Perexval’skaja. 1994. "Tazov jazyk [The language of the Taz]", in Vladimir Neroznak (ed.) Krasnaja kniga jazykov narodov Rossii. Enciklopedičeskij slovar’-spravočnik [The Red Book of languages of Russia. Encyclopedic dictionary]. Moscow: Academia, 50–51.
