= Peking (disambiguation) =

Peking is an alternate and mostly obsolete romanization of Beijing, the capital city of the People's Republic of China.

Peking may also refer to:

- Peking (ship), a 1911 German square-rigged sailing ship launched
- 2045 Peking, an asteroid named for the city
- Local nickname of the Swedish town Norrköping

== See also ==
- Pekingese
- Beijing (disambiguation)
- Beijingese (disambiguation)
- Pekin (disambiguation)
- Pekin duck (disambiguation)
