= Changchun dialect =

Mandarin Chinese dialect of Jilin, China

Changchun
- 長春話 / 长春话; Chángchūnhuà
- Native to: China
- Region: Changchun
- Language family: Sino-Tibetan: Sinitic; Chinese; Mandarin; Northeastern Mandarin; Changchun

Language codes
- ISO 639-3: –
- Glottolog: None

The Changchun dialect is a Mandarin Chinese variety spoken by people in and around the city of Changchun in Jilin Province, China.

== Characteristics ==
The Changchun dialect is a member of the Changchun-Harbin sub-dialects. It is very close to Standard Chinese, but it also has distinct characteristics phonetically and lexically. In history Changchun was near the centre of Manchurian culture, so similar to other Northeastern Mandarin dialects, it has many words borrowed from the Manchu language. After the foundation of the People's Republic of China, Changchun became heavily industrialized and the city grew considerably with migrant workers. As a result, the Changchun dialect resembles Standard Mandarin more than the dialects spoken in nearby rural counties.
