= Beijing, Guangxi =

Beijing 北景镇
- Town
- Location in Guangxi
- Coordinates: 24°8′27″N 107°28′39″E
- Country: People's Republic of China
- Autonomous Region: Guangxi
- Prefecture-level city: Hechi
- Autonomous County: Dahua Yao Autonomous County
- Time zone: UTC+8 (China Standard)

Beijing (Chinese: 北景; pinyin: Běijǐng) is a town in Dahua Yao Autonomous County, Hechi, in Guangxi, China. As of 2020, it administers Nase Community (那色社区) and the following nine villages:

- Jiangdong Village (江栋村)
- Liuhua Village (六华村)
- Handa Village (汉达村)
- Pingfang Village (平方村)
- Jingtun Village (京屯村)
- Banlan Village (板兰村)
- Nongguan Village (弄冠村)
- Anlan Village (安兰村)
- Kekao Village (可考村)
