= Harbin dialect =

Mandarin Chinese dialect of Harbin, China

Harbin
- Native to: China
- Region: Harbin
- Language family: Sino-Tibetan: Sinitic; Chinese; Mandarin; Northeastern Mandarin; Harbin

Language codes
- ISO 639-3: –
- Glottolog: haer1234

The Harbin dialect (simplified Chinese: 哈尔滨话; traditional Chinese: 哈爾濱話; pinyin: Hā'ěrbīnhuà) is a variety of Mandarin Chinese spoken in and around the city of Harbin, the capital of Heilongjiang province.

== Characteristics ==
Harbin dialect is phonologically close to the Standard Mandarin language, but the dialect itself carries with it strong cultural and regional connotations. However, the Harbin dialect is still widely considered to have the most accurate pronunciation when compared with the Standard Mandarin language.

== Vocabulary ==
The vocabulary of Harbin dialect is different from Standard Mandarin for two reasons. One of the sources of the distinct lexical features of the Harbin dialect is the area's colonial Russian influence. The Russian colonial period started in the 1900s, which marked the start of the influx of large amounts of Russian vocabulary, especially neologisms created in Europe and Russia that had never existed in Mandarin. The second source of lexical difference is the influence of language contact between the local Mandarin language and the Manchu language.
