= Beijing Mandarin (division of Mandarin) =

Mandarin dialects spoken around Beijing, China

- Beijingese
- 北京官話 / 北京官话; Běijīng Guānhuà
- Pronunciation: Beijing dialect: [pèɪtɕíŋ kwánxwâ]
- Region: Beijing, Hebei, Inner Mongolia, Liaoning and Tianjin
- Native speakers: 27 million (2004)
- Language family: Sino-Tibetan: Sinitic; Chinese; Mandarin; Beijing Mandarin
- Dialects: Beijing dialect; Chengde dialect; Chifeng dialect

Language codes
- ISO 639-3: –
- ISO 639-6: bjgh
- Glottolog: beij1235 Beijingic
- Linguasphere: 79-AAA-bb
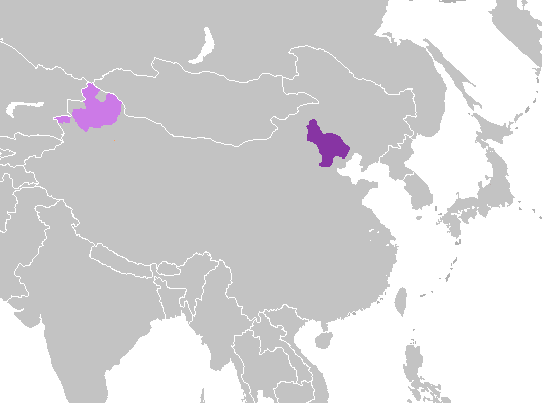

In Chinese dialectology, Beijing Mandarin (simplified Chinese: 北京官话; traditional Chinese: 北京官話; pinyin: Běijīng Guānhuà) refers to a major branch of Mandarin Chinese recognized by the Language Atlas of China, encompassing a number of dialects spoken in areas of Beijing, Hebei, Inner Mongolia, Liaoning, and Tianjin, the most important of which is the Beijing dialect, which provides the phonological basis for Standard Chinese. Both Beijing Mandarin and its Beijing dialect are also called Beijingese.

== Classification ==
Beijing Mandarin and Northeastern Mandarin were proposed by Chinese linguist Li Rong as two separate branches of Mandarin in the 1980s. In Li's 1985 paper, he suggested using tonal reflexes of Middle Chinese checked tone characters as the criterion for classifying Mandarin dialects. In this paper, he used the term "Beijing Mandarin" (北京官话) to refer the dialect group in which checked tone characters with a voiceless initial have dark level, light level, rising and departing tone reflexes. He chose the name Beijing Mandarin as this Mandarin group is approximate to the Beijing dialect.

He subsequently proposed a split of Beijing Mandarin and Northeastern Mandarin in 1987, listing the following as reasons:

- Checked-tone characters with voiceless initials in Middle Chinese are far more commonly distributed into the rising tone category in Northeastern Mandarin than in Beijing Mandarin;
- The tonal value of the dark level tone is lower in Northeastern Mandarin than that in Beijing Mandarin;
- Generally, the 日 initial of Middle Chinese developed into a modern non-null initial in Beijing Mandarin and a modern null initial in Northeastern Mandarin.

The 2012 edition of Language Atlas of China added one more method for distinguishing Beijing Mandarin from Northeastern Mandarin:

- The modern pronunciations of the 精, 知, 莊 and 章 initials of Middle Chinese are two sets of sibilants—dental and retroflex—and these two sets are not merged or confused in Beijing Mandarin.

Meanwhile, there are some scholars who regard Beijing Mandarin and Northeastern Mandarin as a single division of Mandarin. Lin (1987) noticed the phonological similarity between Beijing Mandarin and Northeastern Mandarin. Zhang (2010) suggested that the criteria for the division of Beijing Mandarin and Northeastern Mandarin as top-level Mandarin groups are inconsistent with the criterion for the division of other top-level Mandarin groups.

== Subdivisions ==
Beijing Mandarin is classified into the following subdivisions in the 2012 edition of Language Atlas of China:

- Jīng–Chéng (京承)
  - Jīngshī (京师; 京師), including the urban area and some inner suburbs of Beijing.
  - Huái–Chéng (怀承; 懷承), including some suburbs of Beijing, parts of Langfang, most parts of Chengde, Wuqing and Duolun.
- Cháo–Fēng (朝峰), an area between the Huái–Chéng cluster and the Northeastern Mandarin, covering the cities of Chaoyang and Chifeng. This subgroup has characteristics intermediate of those of Beijing Mandarin and Northeastern Mandarin.

Per the 2012 edition of Atlas, these subgroups are distinguished by the following features:

- Jīng–Chéng subgroup has a high dark level tone, and the Cháo–Fēng subgroup a relatively low one;
- Within the Jīng–Chéng subgroup, dialects in the Huái–Chéng cluster append an /n/ or /ŋ/ initial to kaikou hu characters with 影, 疑, 云 and 以 initials in Middle Chinese, while an initial is absent in the Jīngshī cluster.

Compared with the first edition (1987), the second edition (2012) of the Atlas demoted Jīngshī and Huái–Chéng subgroups to clusters of a new Jīng–Chéng subgroup. Shí–Kè (石克) or Běijiāng (北疆) subgroup (including the cities of Shihezi and Karamay), listed as a subgroup of Beijing Mandarin in the 1987 edition, is re-allocated to a Běijiāng (北疆) subgroup of Lanyin Mandarin and a Nánjiāng (南疆) subgroup of Central Plains Mandarin. The Cháo–Fēng subgroup covers a greater area in the 2012 edition.

== Phonological features ==
=== Initials ===
With regard to initials, the reflexes of kaikou hu syllables with any of the 影, 疑, 云 and 以 initials in Middle Chinese differ amongst the subgroups: a null initial is found in the Jīngshī cluster, while /n/ or /ŋ/ initials are often present in the Huái–Chéng cluster and the Cháo–Fēng subgroup.

Initial in Middle Chinese ►		*ŋ	*ŋ	*ʔ	*ʔ	*ʔ
Subdivision	Location	鹅	昂	爱	矮	袄
Jingshi	Beijing	∅	∅	∅	∅	∅
Huai–Cheng	Chengde	n	n	n	n	n
Chao–Feng	Chifeng (old-style)	ŋ	∅	∅	ŋ	n

Dental and retroflex sibilants are distinct phonemes in Beijing Mandarin. This is contrary to Northeastern Mandarin, in which the two categories are either in free variation or merged into a single type of sibilants.

=== Tones ===
In both Beijing Mandarin and Northeastern Mandarin, the checked tone of Middle Chinese has completely dissolved and is distributed irregularly among the remaining tones. However, Beijing Mandarin has significantly fewer rising-tone characters with a checked-tone origin, compared with Northeastern Mandarin.

Subdivision	Location	戳	福	质
Beijing Mandarin	Beijing	dark level	light level	departing
Northeastern Mandarin	Harbin	rising	rising	rising

The Cháo–Fēng subgroup generally has a lower tonal value for the dark level tone.

Tones of Beijing Mandarin dialects
Subdivision	Location	Dark level	Light level	Rising	Departing	Ref.
Jingshi	Beijing	˥ (55)	˧˥ (35)	˨˩˦ (214)	˥˩ (51)	
Huai–Cheng	Chengde	˥ (55)	˧˥ (35)	˨˩˦ (214)	˥˩ (51)	
Chao–Feng	Chifeng	˦ (44)	˧˧˥ (335)	˨˩˧ (213)	˥˧ (53)	
Chao–Feng	Xingcheng	˦ (44)	˧˥ (35)	˨˩˧ (213)	˥˩ (51)	
Taiwanese	Taipei	˦ (44)	˧˨˧ (323)	˧˩˨ (312)	˥˨ (52)	
Taiwanese	Taichung	˦ (33)	˧˨˨ (322)	˧˩ (31)	˦˨ (32)	

== Lexical features ==
The Cháo–Fēng subgroup has more words in common with that of Northeastern Mandarin.

	this place	to envy	to deceive	to show off; to brag	dirty	to do
MSC	这地方	嫉妒	骗人	炫耀	脏	搞
Chao–Feng	这圪垯	眼气	忽悠	得瑟	埋汰	整

The intensifier 老 is also used in the Cháo–Fēng subgroup.
