= Beijing Township =

Beijing Township 北景乡
- Township
- Location in Shanxi
- Coordinates: 35°12′38″N 110°43′50″E
- Country: People's Republic of China
- Province: Shanxi
- Prefecture-level city: Yuncheng
- County: Linyi County
- Time zone: UTC+8 (China Standard)

Beijing Township (simplified Chinese: 北景乡; traditional Chinese: 北景鄉; pinyin: Běijǐng Xiāng) is a township under the administration of Linyi County in southwestern Shanxi, China. As of 2020, it has 29 villages under its administration.

- Beijing Village
- Beili Village (北里村)
- Dong Village (东村)
- Jing Village (景村)
- Nanjing Village (南景村)
- Qi Village (齐村)
- Shijiazhuang Village (石家庄村)
- Xi Village (西村)
- Zhang Village (张村)
- Dayan Village (大闫村)
- Zhaizhuang Village (翟庄村)
- Gaojiazhuang Village (高家庄村)
- Jiazhuang Village (贾庄村)
- Jiaojiaying Village (焦家营村)
- Jingzhuang Village (景庄村)
- Luo Village (罗村)
- Majiayao Village (马家窑村)
- Nanzhuang Village (南庄村)
- Weizhuang Village (尉庄村)
- Beizhi Village (贝支村)
- Chenzhuang Village (陈庄村)
- Fengxian Village (峰仙村)
- Lijiazhuang Village (李家庄村)
- Nandachen Village (南大陈村)
- Nandian Village (南佃村)
- Nanxue Village (南薛村)
- Xichenzhai Village (西陈翟村)
- Yanjiazhuang Village (闫家庄村)
- Zhangbai Village (张白村)
