= Beijing dialect =

Dialect of Mandarin spoken in China

- Pekingese, Beijingese
- 北京话; Běijīnghuà
- Native to: China
- Region: Beijing urban districts
- Language family: Sino-Tibetan: Sinitic; Chinese; Mandarin; Beijing Mandarin; Beijing dialect
- Standard forms: Standard Chinese; Taiwanese Mandarin; Singaporean Mandarin; Malaysian Mandarin

Language codes
- ISO 639-3: –
- ISO 639-6: bjjg
- Glottolog: beij1234
- Linguasphere: 79-AAA-bb
- IETF: cmn-u-sd-cnbj

The Beijing dialect (simplified Chinese: 北京话; traditional Chinese: 北京話; pinyin: Běijīnghuà), also known as Pekingese and Beijingese, is the prestige dialect of Mandarin spoken in the urban area of Beijing, China. It is the phonological basis of Standard Chinese. (Note: Official language in the People's Republic of China and one of the official languages of Singapore and the Republic of China) Despite the similarity to Standard Chinese, it is characterized by some "iconic" differences, including the addition of a final rhotic 儿; -r to some words (e.g. 哪儿; nǎr). During the Ming, southern dialectal influences were also introduced into the dialect.

== History ==
=== Status as prestige dialect ===
As the political and cultural capital of China, Beijing has held much historical significance as a city, and its speech has held sway as a lingua franca. Being officially selected to form the basis of the phonology of Standard Mandarin has further contributed to its status as a prestige dialect, or sometimes the prestige dialect of Chinese.

Other scholars have referred to it as the "elite Beijing accent."

Until at least the late 18th century, the standard language of the Chinese elite had been the Nanjing dialect, despite political power having already been located in Beijing. Through the nineteenth century, evidence from Western dictionaries suggests that a shift occurred in the court from a Nanjing-based standard to a more local Beijing-based one.

During the Qing dynasty it was used alongside the Manchu language as the official court language.

The establishment of phonology of Standard Chinese dates from a 1913 decision by the Commission on the Unification of Pronunciation, which took the Beijing dialect as its base but retained a lot of phonology from other varieties of Mandarin, resulting in the Old National Pronunciation. This was overturned in 1926, resulting in the "pronunciation of the educated natives of Beijing" officially adopted as the basis for the phonology of Standard Chinese (Guoyu) in 1926.

In 1955, the People's Republic of China declared that Standard Chinese was to be "modeled on the pronunciation of Beijing, draws on Northern Chinese as its base dialect, and receives its syntactic norms from exemplary works of vernacular literature".

The Beijing dialect has been described as carrying a lot of "cultural heft." According to Zhang Shifang, professor at Beijing Language and Culture University,

"As China's ancient and modern capital, Beijing and thus its linguistic culture as well are representative of our entire nation's civilization... For Beijing people themselves, the Beijing dialect is an important symbol of identity."

Some argue that Cantonese is the "only dialect which has attained a level of prestige that rivals that of the standard national language."

The dialect has been described as "the official language of the entertainment industry", making it also the "showbiz accent."

Even within Beijing the dialect varies. Those north of the Forbidden City spoke with a more "refined" accent than the poorer people, craftsmen, and performers of the south.

=== Younger generation ===
Some fear that the vernacular Beijing dialect will disappear. According to a 2010 study by Beijing Union University, 49% of young Beijingers born after 1980 prefer to speak standard Mandarin rather than the Beijing dialect. According to a UN report, nearly 100 Chinese dialects, especially those spoken by the 55 ethnic minorities in China, are endangered.

== Mutual intelligibility ==
The Beijing dialect is generally mutually intelligible with other Mandarin dialects, including Standard Chinese. However it is not intelligible with other Sino-Tibetan languages or even other Chinese languages including Cantonese, Hokkien, and Wu Chinese.

The Dungan language is a Sinitic language derived from Mandarin spoken throughout Central Asia, particularly in Kyrgyzstan and Kazakhstan. Speakers like Dungan poet and scholar Iasyr Shivaza and others have reported that Chinese who speak the Beijing dialect could understand Dungan, but Dungans could not understand Beijing Mandarin.

== Phonology ==
In fundamental structure, the phonology of the Beijing dialect and Standard Chinese are almost identical. In part, this is because the pronunciation of Standard Chinese was based on Beijing pronunciation. However, the Beijing dialect also has vernacular readings of characters which are not only different, but have initial and final combinations that are not present in Standard Chinese, such as 嗲; diǎ, 塞; sēi, 甭; béng, 忒; tēi, and 色; shǎi.

Other differences exist, including the proliferation of rhotic vowels. All rhotic vowels are the result of the use of the 儿; -r /-ɚ/, a noun suffix, except for a few words pronounced [ɐɚ̯] that do not have this suffix. In Standard Chinese, these also occur but much less often than they appear in the Beijing dialect. This phenomenon is known as 儿化; érhuà, or rhotacization, as is considered one of the iconic characteristics of Beijing Mandarin.

When /w/ occurs in syllable-initial position, many speakers use [ʋ] before vowels other than [o] as in 我 wǒ, and [u] as in 五; wǔ, e.g. 尾巴 wěiba [ʋei̯˨pa˦].

When /ŋ/ occurs before a glide or vowel it is often eliminated along with any following glides so 中央; zhōngyāng is pronounced zhuāng and 公安局; gōng'ānjú as guānjú.

Sibilant initials differ significantly between Standard Chinese and the Beijing dialect. The initials ⟨z c s⟩ /ts tsʰ s/ are pronounced as [tθ tθʰ θ] in Beijing. ⟨j q x⟩ /tɕ tɕʰ ɕ/ are pronounced as /ts tsʰ s/ by some female speakers, a feature known as 女国音; nǚguóyīn; 'female Standard Chinese'.

Moreover, the Beijing dialect has a few phonetic reductions that are usually considered too "colloquial" for use in Standard Chinese. These are often dependent on which syllables are stressed and unstressed. For example, in fast speech, initial consonants go through lenition if they are in an unstressed syllable: pinyin] ⟨zh ch sh⟩ /tʂ tʂʰ ʂ/ before ⟨e i u⟩ become ⟨r⟩ /ɻ/, so 不知道; bùzhīdào; 'don't know' can sound like bùrdào; 老师; lǎoshī can sound like lǎor, resulting in a "swallowing of consonants", or 吞音; tūnyīn.

⟨j q x⟩ /tɕ tɕʰ ɕ/ become ⟨y⟩ /j/, so 赶紧去; gǎnjǐnqù; 'go quickly' can sound like gǎnyǐnqù; pinyin ⟨b d g⟩ /p t k/ go through voicing to become [b d ɡ]; intervocalic ⟨p t k⟩ /pʰ tʰ kʰ/ also lose aspiration and can be voiced, sounding identical to ⟨b d g⟩; similar changes also occur on other consonants.

⟨f⟩ is voiced and relaxed in intervocalic positions, resulting in [ʋ].

Affricates are elided into fricatives when not word initial, such as 茅厕; máocè becoming máosi.

Some of these changes yield syllables that violate the syllable structure of Standard Chinese, such as 大柵欄; Dà Zhàlán Street, which locals pronounce as Dàshlàr.

The literary tones of the Beijing dialect tend to be more exaggerated than Standard Chinese. In Standard Chinese, the four tones are high flat, high rising, low dipping, and falling; in the Beijing dialect, the first two tones are higher, the third one dips more prominently, and the fourth one falls more. However, toneless syllables are incredibly common in the vernacular Beijing dialect and the third tone is realized as a low tone instead of a dipping tone, known as a "half third tone".

=== Influence on Manchu ===
Many of the Manchu words are now pronounced with some Chinese peculiarities of pronunciation, so k before i and e=ch', g before i and e=ch, h and s before i=hs, etc. H before a, o, u, ū, is the guttural Scotch or German ch.

— A Manchu Grammar: With Analysed Texts, Paul Georg von Möllendorff, p. 1.

The Chinese Northern Mandarin dialect spoken in Beijing had a major impact on the phonology of the dialect of Manchu spoken in Beijing, and since Manchu phonology was transcribed into Chinese and European sources based on the sinified pronunciation of Manchus from Beijing, the original authentic Manchu pronunciation is unknown to scholars.

The Manchus that lived in Beijing were influenced by the Beijing dialect insofar as pronouncing Manchu sounds was hard for them, and they pronounced Manchu according to Chinese phonetics. In contrast, the Manchus of Aigun, Heilongjiang could both pronounce Manchu sounds properly and mimic the sinified pronunciation of Manchus in Beijing. This was because they learned the Beijing pronunciation from either studying in Beijing or from officials sent to Aigun from Beijing. They could also tell them apart, using the Chinese influenced pronunciation of Beijing to demonstrate that they were better educated and had "superior stature" in society.

=== Influence on Mongolian ===
A substantial proportion of the loanwords in Mongolian are derived from Chinese, with the oldest layer of loanwords in Written Mongolian being Chinese in origin. Much of Mongolian spoken in Inner Mongolia has been affected by Mandarin; lexical influence is claimed to be strong in Khorchin Mongolian, whilst there have been claims of phonetic influence from Mandarin Chinese in the Kharchin variety of Mongolian. The aspirated bilabial stop /pʰ/ and the labial approximant /w/ are phonemes only found in loanwords from Chinese and Tibetan, evident in their limited distribution in Mongolian. Substantial diglossia can also be observed in Inner Mongolia.

== Vocabulary ==
The Beijing dialect typically uses many words that are considered slang, and therefore occur much less or not at all in Standard Chinese. Speakers not native to Beijing may have trouble understanding many or most of these. Many of such slang words employ the rhotic suffix "-r", which is known as erhua. Examples include:

- 倍儿; bèir; 'very'', ''especially' (referring to manner or attribute)
- 别价; biéjie; 'do not', usually followed by 呀 if used as an imperative, usually used when rejecting a favor or politeness from close friends
- 搓火儿; cuōhuǒr; 'to be angry'
- 颠儿了; diārle; 'to leave'', ''to run away'
- 二把刀; èrbǎdāo; 'klutz'
- 撒丫子; sayazi; 'to let go on feet'', ''to go'', ''leave'
- 㞞蔫儿; sóngniār; 'no backbone'', ''spiritless' (Note: Often written as 怂; sóng.)
- 消停; xiāoting; 'to finally become quiet and calm'
- 辙; zhé; 'way to do something', equivalent to Standard Chinese 办法
- 褶子了; zhezile; 'ruined', especially things to do
- 上; shang, often used in place of 去; 'to go'.
- 搁; ge, often used in place of 放; 'to place'.

Some Beijing phrases may be somewhat disseminated outside Beijing:

- 抠门儿; kōumer; 'stingy'', ''miserly', now used outside Beijing
- 劳驾; láojia; 'excuse me!', heard often on public transportation, from Classical Chinese
- 溜达; liūda; 'to stroll about', equivalent to Standard Chinese 逛街 or 散步
- 特; tè, tēi; 'very', a stronger version of Standard Chinese 很 and believed to derive from 特别

Note that some of the slang are considered to be 土话; tuhua; 'base', 'uneducated language', that are carry-overs from an older generation and are no longer used amongst more educated speakers, for example:

- 起小儿; qíxiǎor; 'since a young age', similar to 打小儿 dǎxiǎor, which is more often used by the younger generation
- 晕菜; yūncài; 'to be disoriented'', ''to be confused'', ''to be bewildered'

Others may be viewed as neologisms used among younger speakers and in "trendier" circles:

- 爽; shuǎng; 'cool (in relation to a matter)', cf. 酷; kù when describing a person
- 套瓷儿; tàocír; 'to toss in the hoop', used in basketball
- 小蜜; xiǎomì; 'special female friend', with a negative connotation

=== Manchu and Mongol loanwords ===
The dialect also contains both Manchu and Mongol loanwords:

- 胡同; hútòng; 'hutong', from Middle Mongolian quddug 'water well' (cf. modern Mongolian худаг) or ɣudum 'passage' (modern Mongolian гудам), possibly with influence from Chinese 衕; 'street'', ''passage' and 巷; 'lane'', ''alley'.
- 站; zhàn; 'station', from Middle Mongolian ǰamči 'post station' (cf. modern Mongolian замч 'guide').
- 哏哆／哏叨; hēnduo; 'to reproach', from Manchu hendu

== Grammar ==
There are syntactic differences between Standard Mandarin and the Beijing dialect. Both southern Chinese and southern Mandarin syntactic features were incorporated into Standard Mandarin, while the Beijing dialect retains features of northern Mandarin. The Beijing dialect also uses colloquial expressions differently.

There is a conditional loss of the classifier under certain circumstances after the numeral 一; 'one', usually pronounced as yí with the second tone, as if undergoing tone sandhi with the classifier 个; gè after it.

In general, Standard Chinese is influenced by Classical Chinese, which makes it more condense and concise. The Beijing dialect can therefore seem more longwinded; but this is sometime balanced by the generally faster speaking rate and phonetic reductions of colloquial Beijing speech.

=== Examples ===
- Standard Chinese:

今天 会 下雨， 所以 出门 的 时候 要 记得 带 雨伞。
Jīntiān huì xiàyǔ, suǒyǐ chūmén de shíhou yào jìde dài yǔsan.
It is going to rain today, so remember to bring an umbrella when you go out.

- Beijing dialect:

今儿 得 下雨， （所以） 出门儿 时候 记着 带 伞！
Jīnr děi xiàyǔ, (suǒyǐ) chūménr shíhòu jìzhe dài sǎn!
Jī^{a}r děi xiàyǔ, (suǒ~~y~~ǐ) chūmér ríhòu jìr dài sǎn!

== See also ==
- Chinese in New York City
- List of Chinese dialects
- Putonghua
- Varieties of Chinese
- Sino-Tibetan languages
