= Lazjan =

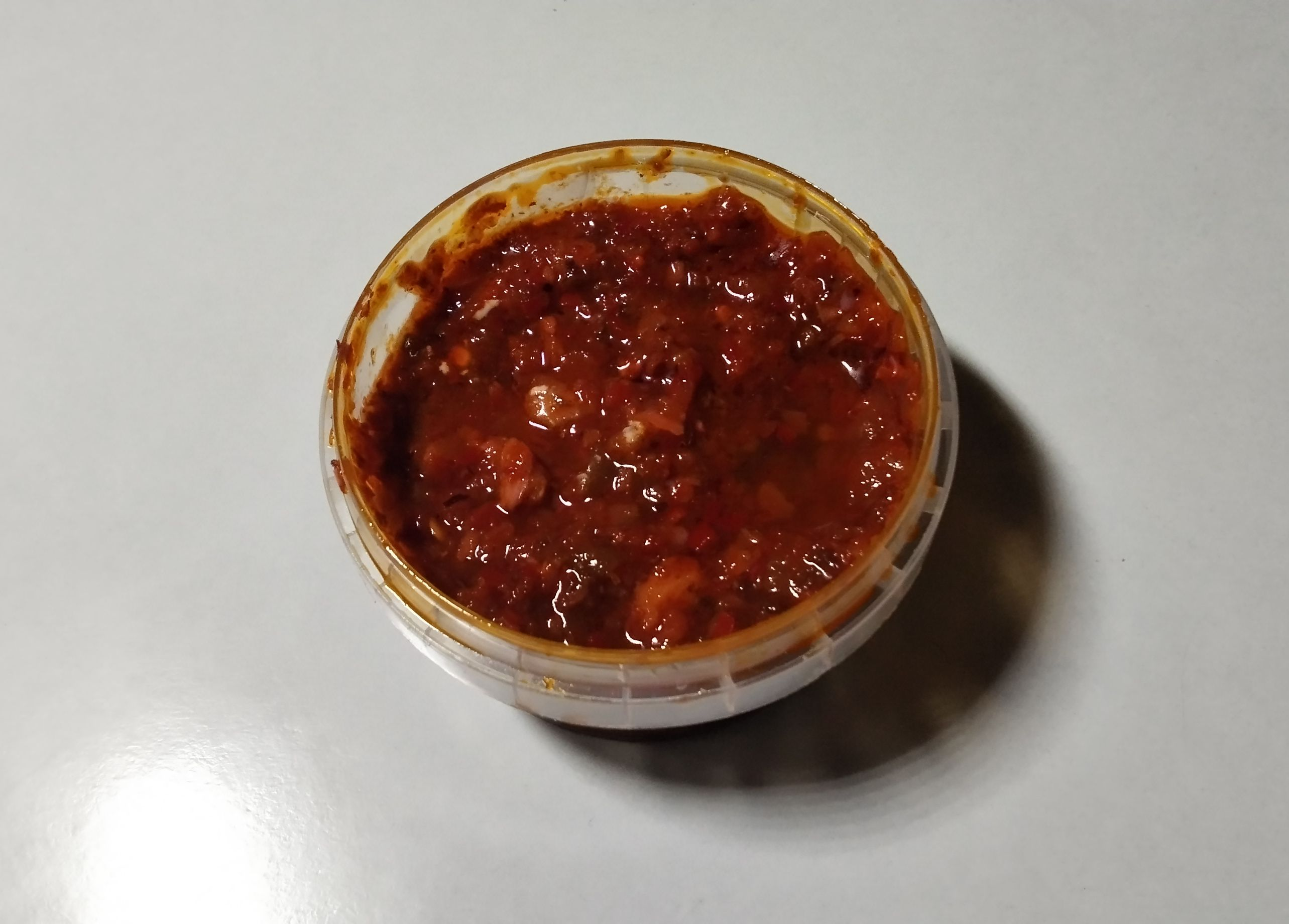
Laza

Laza, lazjan or lazadzhan (sometimes lasjan, lajan; Dungan: ю пә лазы, yü pä lazı) is a Dungan sauce that has spread to many other peoples of modern Central Asia.

This is very spicy and dark-red. It is served with all dishes. Ingredients: chili pepper (different chili peppers are used, dried, fresh or ground), garlic, salt and vegetable oil. To prepare lazadzhan, ground red pepper is mixed with crushed garlic, a small amount of water is added, and then heated in a frying pan with vegetable oil, stirring slowly.

The prepared laza can be stored in a sterile jar for up to a year.

== See also ==
- Shakarap
