= Dungan language =

Sinitic language spoken in Central Asia

Dungan
- Хуэйзў йүян
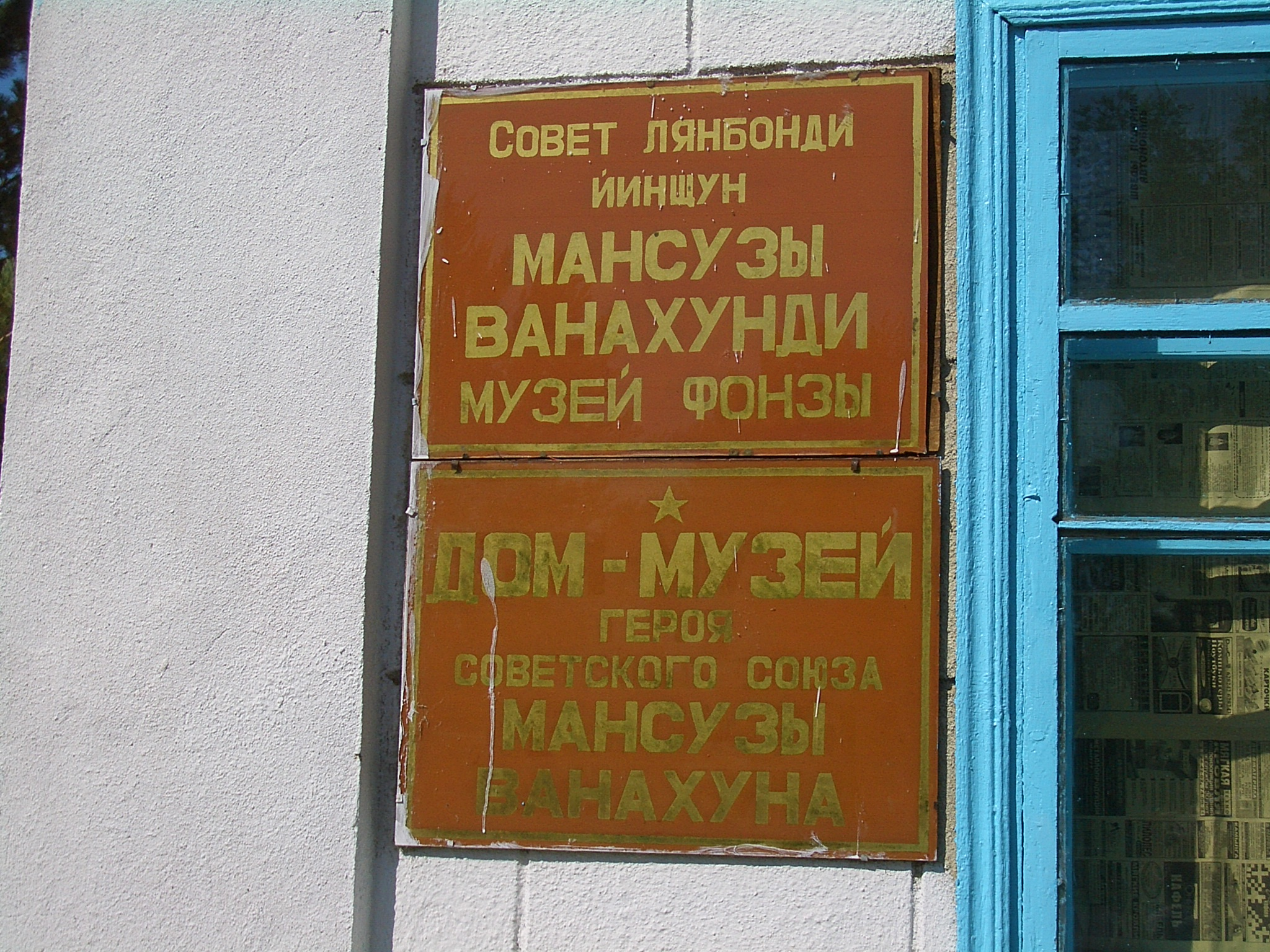
- Bilingual signs in Dungan (top) and Russian at the home of Soviet war hero Mansuz Vanakhun
- Pronunciation: Dungan pronunciation: [xwɛ̌jt͡sû ʝŷʝɛ̃̌]
- Native to: Central Asia
- Region: Chu Valley (Kyrgyzstan, Kazakhstan), Altai Krai, Saratov Oblast (Rovensky District) (Russia), Fergana Valley (Uzbekistan)
- Ethnicity: Dungan
- Native speakers: 145,000 (2009–2021)
- Language family: Sino-Tibetan: Sinitic; Chinese; Mandarin; Central Plains Mandarin; Dungan
- Writing system: Dungan alphabets (Cyrillic, formerly Latin, Arabic and Chinese characters)

Language codes
- ISO 639-3: dng
- Glottolog: dung1253
- ELP: Dungan

Dungan language

Chinese name
- Traditional Chinese: 東干語
- Simplified Chinese: 东干语
Transcriptions
Standard Mandarin
- Hanyu Pinyin: Dōnggānyǔ
- Wade–Giles: Tung^{1}kan^{1} yü^{3}
- IPA: [tʊ́ŋ.kán ỳ]

Dunganese name
- Dungan: Хуэйзў йүян
- Hanzi: 回族語言

Russian name
- Russian: Дунганский язык
- Romanization: Dunganskij jazyk

Kyrgyz name
- Kyrgyz: Дунган тили دۇنعان تىلى; Dungan tili

Kazakh name
- Kazakh: Дүнген тілі دۇنگەن تىلى; Düngen tılı

Uyghur name
- Uyghur: تۇڭگان تىلى; Туңган тили Tunggan tili

Dungan (/ˈdʊŋ.ɡɑːn/ or /ˈdʌŋ.ɡən/) is a Sinitic language spoken primarily in the Chu Valley of southeastern Kazakhstan and northern Kyrgyzstan. It is the native language of the Dungan people, a Hui subgroup that fled Qing China in the 19th century. It evolved from the Central Plains Mandarin varieties spoken in Gansu and Shaanxi. It is the only Sino-Tibetan language to be officially written in the Cyrillic script. In addition, the Dungan language contains loanwords and archaisms not found in other modern varieties of Mandarin.

== History ==
The Dungan people of Kazakhstan and Kyrgyzstan (with smaller groups living in other post-Soviet states) are the descendants of several groups of the Hui people that migrated to the region in the 1870s and the 1880s after the defeat of the Dungan revolt in Northwestern China. The Hui of Northwestern China (often referred to as "Dungans" or "Tungani" by 19th-century western writers, as well as by some Turkic peoples) would normally speak the same Mandarin dialect as the Han people in the same area (or in the area from which the particular Hui community had been resettled). At the same time, due to their unique history, their speech would be rich in Islamic or Islam-influenced terminology, based on loanwords from Arabic, Persian and Turkic languages, as well as translations of them into Chinese. The Hui traders in the bazaars would be able to use Arabic or Persian numbers when talking between themselves, to keep their communications secret from Han bystanders. While not constituting a separate language, these words, phrases and turns of speech, known as Huihui hua (回回話, "Hui speech"), served as markers of group identity. As early 20th century travellers in Northwestern China would note, "the Mohammedan Chinese have to some extent a vocabulary and always a style and manner of speech, all their own".

As the Dungans in the Russian Empire — and even more so in the Soviet Union — were isolated from China, their language experienced significant influence from the Russian and the Turkic languages of their neighbors.

With the foundation of the Soviet Union, researchers established alphabets and a literary (standard) form of Dungan. Dungan's first alphabet was Latinized. Publications began in 1929, ceased shortly before WWII, and continued in 1955 after the development of a new Cyrillized alphabet.

Intelligentsia have published school textbooks, a three volume Russian–Dungan dictionary (14,000 words), a Dungan–Russian dictionary, linguistic monographs on the language, collections of folk tales, original and translated fiction, and poetry. Usual print runs were no more than a few hundred copies. Yakub Dzhon wrote the first book, a language primer, in 1929. The first Dungan-language newspaper, Huimin bao, was established in 1932; it continues publication today in weekly form. By the count of the chief librarian of the National Library of Russia's bibliography, nearly 400 Dungan books have been published. Publications have become less common after the end of the Soviet Union.

Free from education in the literary Chinese idiom, literary Dungan is much closer to the everyday language. This makes Dungan poetry especially unique in the history of Chinese poetry (if it is to be counted). Literary works, most notably those of Dungan poet Yasyr Shivaza, have been translated into Russian, Standard Chinese and a number of other languages, with print runs in some of them been much higher than in the original Dungan. English translations of some of them, along with the original Dungan text, are available in Rimsky-Korsakoff Dyer (1991).

Dungan-language television programs and radio broadcasts appeared in the 90s following the dissolution of the Soviet Union and weakening of the Russian language's status; however, by one 2012 report, these were terminated and moribund, respectively.

== Geographical distribution ==
Dungan is spoken primarily in Kyrgyzstan, with speakers in Russia, Kazakhstan and Uzbekistan as well.

According to the Soviet census statistics from 1970 to 1989, the Dungan maintained the use of their ethnic language much more successfully than other minority ethnic groups in Central Asia; however, in the post-Soviet period, the proportion of Dungans speaking the Dungan language as their native language appears to have fallen sharply.

Dungan speakers by population
Year	Dungan L1	Russian L2	Total Dungan population	Source
1970	36,445 (94.3%)	18,566 (48.0%)	38,644	Soviet census
1979	49,020 (94.8%)	32,429 (62.7%)	51,694	Soviet census
1989	65,698 (94.8%)	49,075 (70.8%)	69,323	Soviet census
2001	41,400 (41.4%)	N/A	100,000	Ethnologue

== Dialects ==
Dungan is composed of two dialects. The Gansu dialect, or "Bishkek group", is concentrated in Kyrgyzstan. The Shaanxi dialect, or "Tokmak group", is concentrated in Kazakhstan. There are minor differences in vocabulary and phonology. For example, the Gansu first-person pronoun is вә 我, while the Shaanxi first-person pronoun is ңә 我. However, in Kazakhstan, when speakers of different dialects meet, they tend to switch to Russian.

Standard (literary; written) Dungan is based largely on the Gansu dialect and is purer than the spoken language.

The Dungan of Osh have lost most of their language.

== Phonology ==
In basic structure and vocabulary, the Dungan language is not very different from Mandarin Chinese, specifically a variety of Zhongyuan Mandarin (not Lan-Yin Mandarin) spoken in the southern part of the province of Gansu and the western part of the valley of Guanzhong in the province of Shaanxi. Like other Chinese varieties, Dungan is tonal. There are two main dialects, one with 4 tones and the other, considered standard, with 3 tones in the final position in phonetic words and 4 tones in the nonfinal position.

=== Consonants ===
Consonant phonemes of Dungan
		Labial	Alveolar	Retroflex	(Alveolo-) palatal	Velar
Nasal		m	n			ŋ
Stop	voiceless	p	t			k
Stop	aspirated	pʰ	tʰ			kʰ
Affricate	voiceless	(p̪͡f)	t͡s	ʈ͡ʂ	t͡ɕ	
Affricate	aspirated	(p̪͡fʰ)	t͡sʰ	ʈ͡ʂʰ	t͡ɕʰ	
Fricative	voiceless	f	s	ʂ	ɕ	x
Fricative	voiced	v		ʐ	ʝ	
Approximant		v	l	ɻ		

Consonant table with orthography
Unaspirated		Aspirated		Nasal		Fricative		Voiced	
Cyrillic	IPA	Cyrillic	IPA	Cyrillic	IPA	Cyrillic	IPA	Cyrillic	IPA
б	[p]	п	[pʰ]	м	[m]	ф	[f]	в	[v], [w]
д	[t]	т	[tʰ]	н	[n]			л	[l]
з	[t͡s]	ц	[t͡sʰ]			с	[s]	р	[ɻ]
җ	[t͡ʂ]	ч	[t͡ʂʰ]			ш	[ʂ]	ж	[ʐ]
җ	[t͡ɕ]	ч	[t͡ɕʰ]			щ	[ɕ]	й	[ʝ]
г	[k]	к	[kʰ]	ң	[ŋ]	х	[x]		

- /ŋ/ can also be heard as a voiced fricative [ɣ] among other Gansu dialects.
- /v/ can be heard as [w] in the Şanşi dialects.
- The labialized retroflex fricatives and affricates [ʂʷ][tʂʷ][tʂʰʷ] can be respectively pronounced as the labiodental [f][p̪͡f][p̪͡fʰ]. This phenomenon can be observed through the word фə 說, with the initial being [f], as opposed to [ʂʷ] in Old Mandarin. Svetlana Rimsky-Korsakoff: "There is a tendency in some speakers for the retroflexed alveo-palatals to be pronounced as rounded labio-dental affricates. Hashimoto has traced this phenomenon in other North-west dialects." Hashimoto: "A theoretically more interesting point here is that Chinese palatals /č, č’, etc./ go to [Dungan] labials [pf, pf’, etc.]"

=== Vowels ===
Medial	Nucleus											
Medial	∅	a	ɤ	ɛ	ɔ	ʊ	əj	∅̃	æ̃	ɔ̃	ʊ̃	ɚ
∅	ɨ	a	ɤ	ɛ	ɔ	ʊ	əj	ə̃	æ̃	ɔ̃	ʊ̃	ɚ
j	i	ja	je		jɔ	jɤw		ĩ	jɛ̃	jɔ̃		
w	u	wa	wɤ	wɛ	wɔ	u	wəj		wæ̃	wɔ̃	ũ	
ɥ	y	ɥa	ɥe					ỹ	yɛ̃			

Finals
Cyrillic	IPA	Cyrillic	IPA	Cyrillic	IPA	Cyrillic	IPA
ы	[ɨ]	и	[i], [ɪi]	ў	[u], [ɤu]	ү	[y]
а	[a]	я	[ja]	уа	[wa]	үa	[ɥa]
ә	[ɤ]	е	[je]	уә	[wɤ]	үә	[ɥe]
э	[ɛ]			уэ	[wɛ]		
о	[ɔ]	ё	[jɔ]	уэй	[wəj]		
ый	[əj]			уй	[wəj]		
у	[ʊ]	ю	[jɤw]	уо	[wɔ]		
ан	[æ̃]	ян	[jɛ̃]	уан	[wæ̃]	үан	[yɛ̃]
он	[ɔ̃]	ён	[jɔ̃]	уон	[wɔ̃]		
ын	[ə̃~ɤ̃]	ин	[ĩ], [ɪĩ]	ун	[ʊ̃], [ʊə̃]	үн	[ỹ]
эр	[ɚ~əɻ]			ўн	[ũ]		

- /ə˞/ can be heard as [ɯ˞] in Kyrgyzstan.
- With х-, -уй is respelled as -уэй to avoid homography with the Russian-language vulgarity. This is the same treatment as in the Palladius system.

In addition to the above table, there are rhotacised vowels, as well as some finals only seen in loanwords from Russian, Arabic, Kyrgyz, etc.

Finals beginning with (й)и (including я, е, ё, ю) or (й)ү are also valid syllables. Dungan is characterized by a paucity of zero-initial syllables otherwise, with zero initial being limited to the rhotacized эр, the prefix а-, and to interjections.

=== Tones ===
Tonal comparison between Dungan and Mandarin
Tone name		Dungan example		Gansu-Dungan		Shaanxi-Dungan		Notes	Standard Chinese tone number	Chinese character		Standard Chinese	
Tone name		Orthography	IPA	Pitch pattern	Tone contour	Pitch pattern	Tone contour	Notes	Standard Chinese tone number	Orthography	IPA	Pitch pattern	Tone contour
ту йигы (I) шынйин пиншын 平聲 píngshēng	陰平 yīnpíng	хуа I хуа Ia	/xwǎ/	Rising	˨˦ (24)	Falling	˥˩ (51)	Ia merges to Ib in word-final syllables, including monosyllables.	1	花	/xwá/	High	˥ (55)
ту йигы (I) шынйин пиншын 平聲 píngshēng	陽平 yángpíng	хуа I хуа Ib	/xwǎ/	Rising	˨˦ (24)	Rising	˨˦ (24)	Ia merges to Ib in word-final syllables, including monosyllables.	2	華	/xwǎ/	Rising	˧˥ (35)
ди эргы (II) шынйин гошын 上聲 shǎngshēng		вə II	/vɤ̂/	Falling	˥˩ (51)	Falling	˥˧ (53)		3	我	/wò/	Low/dipping	˩, ˨˩˦ (1, 214)
ди сангы (III) шынйин дишын 去聲 qùshēng		чў III	/t͡ɕú/	High	˦ (44)	High	˦ (44)	Some syllables originating in tone 4 fall into tone 1 in modern Mandarin.	4	去	/t͡ɕʰŷ/	Falling	˥˨ (52)
輕聲 qīngshēng		зы I/II/III зы	/t͡sɨ/	Short	Varies	Short	Varies	Actual pitch depends on the preceding syllable.	0	子	/t͡sɹ̩/	Short	Varies

== Writing system ==
Following Soviet policies, Dungan is written in a Cyrillic Russian-based alphabet with five additional letters: Ә, Җ, Ң, Ў and Ү. (It is not to be confused with the Palladius system designed for Standard Chinese.)

Modern Dungan alphabet and letter pronunciations
Cyrillic	А/а	Б/б	В/в	Г/г	Д/д	Е/е	Ё/ё	Ә/ә	Ж/ж	Җ/җ	З/з	И/и	Й/й	К/к
Name	a	бэ	вэ	гэ	дэ	e	ё	ә	жэ	җe	зэ	и	йи	кa
IPA	[a]	[pɛ]	[vɛ]	[kɛ]	[tɛ]	[je]	[jɔ]	[ɤ]	[ʐɛ]	[t͡ɕʲe]	[t͡sɛ]	[i]	[ʝi]	[kʰa]
Cyrillic	Л/л	М/м	Н/н	Ң/ң	О/о	П/п	Р/р	С/с	Т/т	У/у	Ў/ў	Ү/ү	Ф/ф	Х/х
Name	эль	эм	эн	ың	o	пэ	эр	эc	тэ	у	ў	ү	эф	xa
IPA	[ɛlʲ]	[ɛm]	[ɛn]	[ɨŋ]	[ɔ]	[pʰɛ]	[əɻ]	[ɛs]	[tʰɛ]	[ʊw]	[u]	[y]	[ɛf]	[xa]
Cyrillic	Ц/ц	Ч/ч	Ш/ш	Щ/щ	Ъ/ъ	Ы/ы	Ь/ь	Э/э	Ю/ю	Я/я				
Name	цэ	чэ	шa	щa	нин xo	ы	ван xo	э	ю	йa				
IPA	[t͡sʰɛ]	[t͡ʂʰɛ]	[ʂa]	[ɕa]	[nʲɪ̃ xɔ]	[ɨ]	[vã xɔ]	[ɛ]	[jʊw]	[ja]				

Dungan is uniquely one of the few varieties of Chinese that is not normally written using Chinese characters.

Originally, the Dungan, as descendants of the Hui, wrote their language in an Arabic-based alphabet known as Xiao'erjing, now virtually extinct among the Dungan. In the Soviet era, members of the community joined the Latinisation movement, creating an alphabet that lasted until 1952, when the Soviet Union completed the shift to Cyrillisation. This is the alphabet in use today.

Tone is not indicated.

This has been met with great interest by those interested in abolishing Chinese characters; Cyrillic Dungan is given as a successful example of how the Chinese languages do not need characters.

Harbsmeier, however, has cautioned that this is not entirely the case, noting that most ordinary speakers read with difficulty, likely because of the omission of tones, and that the works of the poet Iasyr Shivaza present challenges to even the most learned members of the community, it being unclear what words he was using.

=== Comparison with Palladius system ===
Consonants of Standard Chinese and Dungan
Pinyin	Palladius	Dungan	Pinyin	Palladius	Dungan	Pinyin	Palladius	Dungan	Pinyin	Palladius	Dungan
b	б		p	п		m	м		f	ф	
d	д		t	т		n	н	н / л	l	л	
z	цз	з	c	ц		s	с				
j	цз / цзь	җ / җь	q	ц / ць	ч / чь	x	с / сь	щ / щь			
zh	чж	җ	ch	ч		sh	ш	ш / с / ф	r	ж	
g	г		k	к					h	х	

== Grammar ==
In Kazakhstan, the Dungan language has been Russianizing as a result of the post-Soviet urbanization of the population.

=== Nouns ===
Dungan uses the ba-construction, marking the object, more frequently than Standard Chinese.

=== Classifiers ===
Chinese varieties usually have different classifiers for different types of nouns, with northern varieties tending to have fewer classifiers than southern ones. -гә 個 (formerly spelled as -гы) is the only classifier found in the Dungan language, though not the only measure word.

== Vocabulary ==
There is a varying degree of mutual intelligibility between Dungan and various Mandarin dialects.

The basilects of Gansu/Shaanxi Mandarin and Dungan are largely mutually intelligible; Chinese journalists conversant in one of those Mandarin dialects report that they can make themselves understood when communicating with Dungan speakers.

On the other hand, Dungan speakers like Yasyr Shivaza and others have reported that people who speak the Beijing Mandarin dialect can understand Dungan, but Dungans could not understand Beijing Mandarin.

At the level of basic vocabulary, Dungan contains many words not present in most Mandarin dialects, such as Russian, Arabic, Turkic, and Persian loanwords. When Dru C. Gladney, who had spent some years working with the Hui people in China, met with Dungans in Almaty in 1988, he described the experience as speaking "in a hybrid Gansu dialect that combined Turkish and Russian lexical items". Rimsky-Korsakoff Dyer suggests that the Arabic, Turkic and Persian influences are limited mostly to common personal names (such as Fatima and Mukhamed) and to days of the week. About 9% of Dungan words are Russian in origin. Furthermore, Dungan contains some archaic Qing dynasty-era Chinese vocabulary. Because of this, some Dungan vocabulary may sound archaic to Chinese people. For example, they refer to a president as an "emperor" (хуаңды 皇帝) (in addition to зунтун 總統) and call government offices yamen (ямын 衙門), a term for mandarins' offices in ancient China.

Furthermore, the acrolects of Dungan and Gansu/Shaanxi Mandarin have diverged significantly due to time and cultural influences. During the 20th century, translators and intellectuals introduced many neologisms and calques into the Chinese language, especially for political and technical concepts. Meanwhile, the Dungan, cut off from the mainstream of Chinese discourse by orthographic and political barriers, instead borrowed words for those same concepts from Russian, with which they came into contact through government and higher education.

These borrowings, as well as native Sinitic Dungan vocabulary, affect mutual intelligibility between Dungan and Standard Mandarin.

1950s-era immigrants from Ili and 21st-century increased contact have resulted in mainstream Chinese vocabulary entering the lexicon; for example, radio broadcasts used to sign off with хозэди 好再的 but have switched to зэ җян 再見.

== See also ==
- Latinisation in the Soviet Union and Cyrillisation in the Soviet Union
- Cyrillization of Chinese
