= Iasyr Shivaza =

Soviet writer and activist

Yasir Shiwazi
- Yasır Şivaza
- Born: 5 May or 18 May 1906; Aleksandrovka, Moskva District, Chuy oblast, Russian Empire
- Died: 18 June 1988 (aged 82); Frunze, Kirghiz Soviet Socialist Republic, Soviet Union
- Occupations: Writer; poet; editor; translator; linguist; scholar; social activist
- Years active: 1930–1965

Iasyr Shivaza (5 or 18 May 1906 – 18 June 1988), also known as Xianma, was a Soviet poet, writer, linguist, translator, and social activist, known for his contributions to Dungan art and culture.

Iasyr Shivaza, sometimes spelled Yasir Shiwazi, (Note: Dungan: Ясыр Шывазы (previously spelled "Jasьr Şьvazь"); simplified Chinese: 雅斯尔·十娃子; traditional Chinese: 雅斯爾·十娃子; pinyin: Yǎsī'ěr Shíwázi. (See this section for more.)) Shivaza (Note: Russian: Ясыр Шиваза (BGN/PCGN: Yasyr Shivaza). See also this section.) or Xianma (Dungan: Щянма), was of Dungan descent, as his family were from China's Shaanxi province, and moved to Kyrgyzstan in the early 1880s, after the defeat of the Dungan Rebellion.

Shivaza founded Soviet Dungan literature and authored many textbooks in the Dungan language, helping improve literacy among the Dungan people, who were largely illiterate after fleeing the Qing dynasty. His first book, "The Morning Star", was published in 1931 and is the first printed book in the history of the Dungan people. Shivaza wrote more than thirty works of literature, including collections of poems and short stories in Russian, Kyrgyz and Dungan. He translated classics of Soviet literature from Russian to Dungan, as well as works of Kyrgyz writers and poets into Dungan. His works have also been translated into other languages spoken by the various peoples of the USSR, some of which have been published abroad.

His works reflected both Chinese and Russian cultures. Particularly, the description of Russian folklore in his poetry and the repeated presentation of Russian characters and events reflect the poet's profound Russian complex.

Well respected among Central Asians and Chinese people, Shivaza's Dungan poems became popular in the Sinosphere and the Soviet Union.

== Name spelling ==
His name in the Dungan language was Ясыр Шывазы (pronounced [ʝàsɯ́ɻ ʂʐ̩̌vǎt͡sɹ̩]) and the corresponding name in Mandarin is Yǎsī'ěr Shíwázi (雅斯尔·十娃子 in Simplified Chinese, 雅斯爾·十娃子 in Traditional Chinese). Prior to the switch to the Cyrillic alphabet which he and others had created, his name was spelled "Jasьƣ Şьvazь" in the Latin alphabet used between 1932 and 1953. Before the Soviets banned the Arabic script in the 1920s, his name was rendered in Xiao'erjing as يَاصِعَر شِوَذِ (nowadays used by some Hui). During his literary activity, he was known by his pseudonym "Xianma" (Щянма).

According to Rimsky-Korsakoff (1991), his family name, "Shivazi" (Шывазы), literally means "the tenth child"; the corresponding expression is written in Chinese as 十娃子. This kind of three-syllable family name is common among the Dungan people of the former Soviet Union.

There were two different spellings of his family name: "Shiwazi" and "Shivaza", the latter being used by Russophones due to naming customs imposed by the Russian Empire (later the Soviet Union). He was fully known as Ясыр Джумазович Шиваза (Yasyr Dzhumazovich Shivaza, [jɪˈsɨr d͡ʑʊmɐˈzovʲɪt͡ɕ ɕːɪvɐˈza]) in Russian, with the patrynomic "Джумазович" being derived from his father's Dungan name "Jiujiuzi" (Җюҗюзы, rendered in Russian as "Jumaza" or Джумаза). His Kyrgyz name Ясыр Жумаза уулу Шиваза (Yasyr Jumaza uulu Shivaza, [jɑˈsɯr d͡ʒumɑˈzɑ uːˈɫu ʃivɑˈzɑ], previously spelled "Jasьr Ƶumaza uulu Şivaza" in the Uniform Turkic Alphabet and written as ياسىر شىۋازا in the Perso-Arabic script) was taken from his Russian name.

== Early life ==
Yasir Shiwazi was born on 18 May (or 5 May according to Russian sources) 1906 in the village of Sokuluk (Dungan: Сохўлў) some 30 km west of Bishkek, in what is known today as the Chuy Region of Kyrgyzstan. His parents and grandparents were born in China's Shaanxi province, and came to Kyrgyzstan (at the time, part of the Russian Empire) from the Ili region in the early 1880s, after the defeat of the Dungan Rebellion and the return of the Yining (Kulja) area to China.

In 1916, when he was 10 years old, he was sent to study at the village's Koranic school where he studied Arabic until 1923. During this time, he worked at a blacksmith shop. He later mentioned that it was only by luck that he did not become a mullah, like the other three students who reached the graduation.

After the October Revolution of 1917, Shivaza's father, Jumaza Shivaza (pinyin: Shiwazi Jiujiuzi, Шывазы Җюҗюзы) participated in establishing Soviet power in the region, joining the Communist Party of the Soviet Union in 1919, and later becoming the chairman of the village Soviet.

Later 17-year-old Yasir Shiwazi was chosen, by drawing lots (there were no volunteers), to study at the Tatar Institute for Education of the Minority Group in Tashkent. During the six years (1924–30) that he spent there, Shiwazi, together with other Dungan students including Husein Makeyev and Yusup Yanshansin, started working on designing a suitable alphabet for Dungan based on the Soviet Latin script and began writing Dungan poetry.

== Literary career ==
After graduation, Shiwazi spent two months in the fall of 1930 teaching at a Dungan school in Frunze (now Bishkek), participating in the creation of the first Dungan spelling books and readers. He was then transferred to an editing job at Kirgizgosizdat (Kyrgyzstan State Publishing House), where he worked until 1938, and then again in 1954–1957. He continued to write textbooks and to write poetry. At least three of his textbooks were published in 1933, and at 1934 he was admitted to the prestigious Union of Soviet Writers. He started translating Russian classics into the Dungan language with his translation of several Pushkin's poems being published in Frunze in 1937.

He worked for the Union of Kyrgyz Writers in 1938–1941, and then again in 1946–1954. When Nazi Germany invaded the USSR, he started to do war work, in Moscow and sometimes on the front lines, primarily writing and translating materials for the Kyrgyz-language news-sheets published for the 100,000 or so Kyrgyz soldiers in the Red Army.

The post-war period was a productive one in Shiwazi's writing career. He participated in the committees designing the new Dungan Cyrillic alphabet, which was eventually introduced in 1953. In the 1950s, he was finally able to meet Chinese writers from China whom visited the Soviet Union at the time, and he made a trip to China in 1957 with a Soviet Dungan delegation.

=== Huimin bao ===
He, along with another Dungan poet Husein Makeyev, worked on the Huimin bao (Dungan: Хуэймин бо; Chinese: 回民报), which was published in Bishkek and named after the Hui people, and is the only Dungan-language newspaper. Since the 1930s, the newspaper had been renamed several times; first published in 1930 in the Kirghiz ASSR as Sabattuu bol (Kyrgyz: Сабаттуу бол, lit. 'Be Literate'), then Dun Xuәşir (Dungan: Дун Хуәщир, Chinese: 东火星, lit. 'Spark of the East') in 1932 before all publications were ceased in 1939. As the Soviet Dungan newspaper resumed publication in 1957, it was renamed Sulian huizu bao (Сўлян хуэйзў бо, 苏联回族报, lit. 'Soviet Hui Newspaper'). During this time, Shivazi was appointed its editor-in-chief, holding that post until his retirement in 1965. In 1958, he then renamed the newspaper to Shiyuedi qi (Шийүәди чи, 十月的旗, lit. 'The October Banner'), and then was finally renamed again as Huimin bao after the collapse of the Soviet Union. However, in 2014, this newspaper was renamed by the Chinese as Zhun-ya Huimin bao (中亚回民报, Dungan: Җун-я Хуэймин бо, lit. 'Central Asian Hui Newspaper') due to the fact that Dungan people (part of the Hui ancestry) are spread throughout Central Asia.

== Death ==
Shivazi died on 18 June 1988 at age 82 in Frunze, Kirghiz SSR, (now Bishkek, Kyrgyzstan).

== Original works ==
Shiwazi's literary production was ample and versatile. Along with politically loaded poems and stories, expected from any author who was to survive in Joseph Stalin's era, he wrote love poetry, poems out the past and present of his people and his land, about China, and children's literature. Some of his poetry addressed to China, the land of his ancestors, welcoming the Communist revolution that was happening, or had just happened there.

Soviet Dungans being largely separated from China's written culture, the language of Shiwazi's poetry and prose - and the Dungan literary language in general - is closer to the colloquial, sometimes dialectal Chinese than to traditional Chinese. He was, however, familiar with some of the modern Chinese literature, such as works of Lu Xun, but, since he never had the opportunity to learn Chinese characters, he read the translated Russian versions.

=== Poem sample: "White Butterfly" ===
Following is a short poem by Shiwazi, "White Butterfly", originally published in 1974 in Dungan, along with its KNAB 1994 romanization based on Pinyin, a morpheme-by-morpheme "transcription" into the Chinese characters, and the English translation by Rimsky-Korsakoff (1991), p. 188–189.

Бый хўтер

Тэён җошон, бый хўтер,
Ни тэ гощин.
Ни лян җин гуон фадини,
Чиди чун фын.
Йисыр ни до тяншонли,
Зущён бый юн.
Йисыр зу до хуайүанли.
Ба щян хуар вын.
Җяр хуардини, вә канди,
Ниди щин го.
Дусы ниди да хуайүан,
Ни ющир луә.
Ни лян хун хуар фадини,
Тэёнйибан.
Дын нидини мо җүхуар.
Щүәбый модан…
Нисы чунтян, гуон зоди
Хуар кэди вон.
Зун луәбудо, хўтер-а,
Җин фуершон.

Bei hutier

Taiyon zhaoshon, bei hutier,
Ni tai gaoxin.
Ni lian jin guon fadini,
Qidi chun fen.
Yisir ni dao tianshonli,
Zouxion bei yun.
Yisir zou dao huayuanli.
Ba xian huar wen.
Jiar huardini, we kandi,
Nidi xin gao.
Dousi nidi da huayuan,
Ni youxir lue.
Ni lian hun huar fadini,
Taiyonyiban.
Den nidini mo juhuar.
Xuebei modan…
Nisi chuntian, guon zaodi
Huar kaidi won.
Zun luebudao, hutier-a,
Jin fuyershon.

白蝴蝶兒

太陽照上，白蝴蝶兒
你太高興。
你連金光耍的呢
騎的春風。
一時你到天上了，
走向白雲。
一時走到花園裡，
把鮮花兒聞。
揀花兒的你，我看的，
你的心高。
都是你的大花園，
你有心兒落。
你連紅花兒耍的呢，
太陽一般。
等你的呢毛菊花兒，
雪白牡丹。 。 。
你是春天，光找的
花兒開的旺。
總落不到，蝴蝶兒啊，
金樹葉兒上。

White Butterfly

The sun is shining on a white butterfly,
You are too happy.
You are playing with a golden ray,
Riding the spring wind.
Now you are up in the sky,
Reaching towards the white clouds.
Now you are in the garden,
Sniffing the fresh flowers
In selecting the flowers, I see,
Your ambition is high.
The whole garden is yours,
Alight wherever you like.
You are playing with a red flower,
Which is like the sun.
The chrysanthemums are waiting for you,
And the snow-white peonies…
You are like spring, seeking only
The flowers in full bloom.
But you could never, oh butterfly,
Alight upon a golden leaf.

The poet writes of a butterfly, who is happy in the here-and-now of the spring, but who is not going to see the fall with its golden leaves. He appears to make a botanical error, however, mentioning a variety of chrysanthemum (Chinese: 毛菊花, Dungan: Mо җүхуа) among spring flowers, even though in reality they bloom in the fall.

== Translations ==
Having participated in the creation of the Dungan alphabet and bringing literacy to the Dungan people, Shivaza also did a large amount of work in making literary works from other languages available in Dungan. He rendered a number of classical and modern works of Russian poetry into the Dungan language. He has translated a number of works by Pushkin, Lermontov, Nekrasov, Mayakovsky. He translated song lyrics by Lebedev-Kumach and prose works by Leo Tolstoy, Chekhov, and Maxim Gorky.

He also translated into Dungan some poems of the Ukrainian classic Shevchenko, of the Kyrgyz poets Sashylganov and Tokombaev, and even of the Belarusian Yanka Kupala.

Being fluent in Kyrgyz, Shivaza also translated some of his works into Kyrgyz.

=== Translation sample ===
Following are the first two stanzas of Shivaza's translation of Pushkin's The Tale of the Priest and of His Workman Balda into Dungan along with its Pinyin-based KNAB 1994 transliteration, its morpheme-by-morpheme "transcription" into the Chinese characters, and an English translation.

Ю йигә лодолэ

Нэхур ю йигә лодолэ,
Тасы йигә мынтулэ,
Лодо зэ базаршон җуан,
Та ба юди за хуа кан.

Йигә Балда до мянчян,
Бу җы та вон нани җуан,
Та ги лодо фәди хо:
"Виса ни җир чеди зо,
Ни зэ җытар ба са зо?"

You yige laodaolai

Naihour you yige laodaolai,
Tasi yige mentoulai,
Laodao zai bazarshon zhuan,
Ta ba youdi za hua kan.

Yige Balda dao mianqian,
Bu zhi ta won nani zhuan,
Ta gi laodao fedi hao:
"Wisa ni jir qiedi zao,
Ni zai zhitar ba sa zao?"

有一个老道来

那侯有一个老道来,
他是一个朦头来,
老道在巴扎上转,
他把有的杂货看.

一个巴尔达到面前,
不知他往那里转,
他给老道说得好：
「为啥你今儿起得早？
你在这达儿把啥找？」

There was a priest

There was a priest,
He was dim-witted.
The priest was walking around the bazaar,
He looked at all kinds of goods.

One Balda (Note: Russian: Балда, meaning 'silly fellow'.) came up to him,
Himself not knowing where he was going,
He said to the priest:
"Why did you get so early today?
What are you looking for here?"

== Scholarly works ==
- "Хуэймин бо" (Huimin bao, Frunze, 1957–1964; then known as "Шийүәди чи", 'The Banner of October Revolution')
- "Лёнминщин" ('Morning Star', 1931)
- "Гәминди лон" ('The Wave of the Revolution', 1932)
- "Тёҗянхади сывын" ('Selected Poems', 1958)
- "Хома, чунтян ('Hello, Spring', 1966)
- "Хо пын-ю" ('Good Friends', 1958)
- "Щин сывын", Frunze, 1973; "Мой новый дом" ('My New Home', Frunze, 1969)

== Awards ==
- Order of the Red Banner of Labour - 6 June 1956
- Order of Peoples Friendship - 22 August 1986
- Order "Badge of Honour" (x3) - until 1 November 1958
- Medal For Labor Valour - 4 May 1962
