= Mukhamad =

- Gender: Male
- Language: Russian

Origin
- Meaning: Praiseworthy

Other names
- Derived: Muḥammad, مُحَمَّد, from Ḥammada, "Praise", حَمَّدَ
- Related names: Muhammad

Mukhamad, also spelled Mukhamat, Mukhammad, Mukhammat or Mukhammed, is an Indonesian and Central Asian name. It is a variation of the Arabic name Muhammad meaning "praiseworthy".

== People ==
- Mukhamad Misbakhun, Indonesian businessman
- Mukhamadmurod Abdurakhmonov, Tajikistani judoka
- Mukhamed Tsikanov
- Mukhammadzhon Rakhimov
- Mukhammadkodir Toshtemirov
