= Gyami dialect =

Han people

Gyami
- Region: Sichuan
- Extinct: not attested since the 19th century
- Language family: Sino-Tibetan: Sinitic; Chinese; Mandarin; Gyami

Language codes
- ISO 639-3: –

The Gyami (Tibetan: རྒྱ་མི, THL: Gyami, "Han Chinese") were a Han people of Sichuan at the foot of the Tibetan Plateau who were reported by Brian Houghton Hodgson in 1874.

According to Hodgson, who thought the Gyami descended from a Chinese military outpost, other Chinese considered the Gyami to be Qiangic speakers, suggesting that they did not recognize them as Han Chinese and that they did not use Chinese characters. Victor H. Mair notes that what little is recorded of their speech indicates a degree of assimilation to local languages, but that it is clearly a variety of Mandarin.

== See also ==
- Han Chinese
- Qiangic languages
- Sichuan
- Sino-Tibetan languages
