= Huimin bao =

Socio-political newspaper published in Bishkek, Kyrgyzstan

Хуэймин бо 回民报
- Type: Socio-political newspaper
- Founded: 1932 as Dong Huoxir; 1957 as Sulian huizu bao
- Language: Dungan
- Headquarters: Kyrgyzstan

Huimin bao (Dungan: Хуэймин бо; Chinese: 回民报) is a socio-political newspaper published in Bishkek, Kyrgyzstan. Named after the Hui people, it is the world's only Dungan language newspaper.

In 2014 the Kyrgyz Hui Muslim Association and the China News Agency Xinjiang Branch cooperated to increase the Chinese version of Huimin bao. In the same year, the Chinese decided to rename the newspaper as Zhongya Huimin bao (Central Asian Hui Newspaper; 中亚回民报, Җун-я Хуэймин бо) due to the fact that Dungan people (partly of Hui ancestry) are spread throughout Central Asia.

Newspapers are circulated once a month to 3,000 copies. In the 1970s, Huimin bao published 4,400 copies twice a week.

== History ==
In 1930, the newspaper was first known in Kyrgyz as Sabattuu bol (Сабаттуу бол, 'Be Literate') and was written in the Kirghiz ASSR. Dungan writers Yasir Shiwazi and Husein Makeyev started working on the newspaper. In January 1932, it was published in Dungan as Dong Huexir ('Spark of the East', Dungan: Дун Хуәщир, Chinese: 东火星) in the capital city of what was formerly known as Frunze. It held its name before the newspaper ceased publications in 1939. When the Soviet Dungan newspaper resumed publication in 1957, it was renamed the Sulian huizu bao ('Soviet Hui Newspaper', Сўлян хуэйзў бо, 苏联回族报) while Shiwazi was appointed its editor-in-chief, holding that post until his retirement in 1965. In 1958, Shiwazi then renamed the newspaper to the Shiyuedi qi ('October Banner', Шийүәди чи, 十月的旗), and during this time, the newspaper appeared twice a month with circulation to about 4,400 copies every two weeks. During the collapse of the Soviet Union in the early 1990s, the newspaper was renamed once again to Huimin bao and the circulation was changed to monthly with about 3,000 copies today.
