= Mandarin Chinese =

Branch of the Chinese language family

Mandarin
- Northern Chinese
- Guānhuà ('Mandarin') written in Chinese characters (simplified left, traditional right)
- Native to: China
- Region: North China, Central China, Southwestern China, Malaysia, Singapore, Taiwan
- Speakers: L1: 990 million (2022); L2: 194 million (no date); Total: 1.184 billion (2022)
- Language family: Sino-Tibetan: Sinitic; Chinese; Mandarin
- Early forms: Proto-Sino-Tibetan: Old Chinese; Eastern Han Chinese; Middle Chinese; Old Mandarin; Middle Mandarin
- Standard forms: Standard Mandarin (Putonghua, Guoyu)
- Varieties: Northeastern; Beijing; Ji–Lu; Jiao–Liao; Jianghuai; Central Plains; Lan–Yin; Southwestern; Malaysian; Singaporean; Taiwanese
- Writing system: Chinese characters (Simplified, Traditional); Mainland Chinese Braille; Taiwanese Braille; Two-Cell Chinese Braille; Gwoyeu Romatzyh; Transcriptions: Pinyin (Latin); Zhuyin; Xiao'erjing (Arabic); Dungan (Cyrillic)
- Signed forms: Chinese Sign Language; Taiwanese Sign Language

Language codes
- ISO 639-3: cmn
- Glottolog: mand1415
- Linguasphere: 79-AAA-b
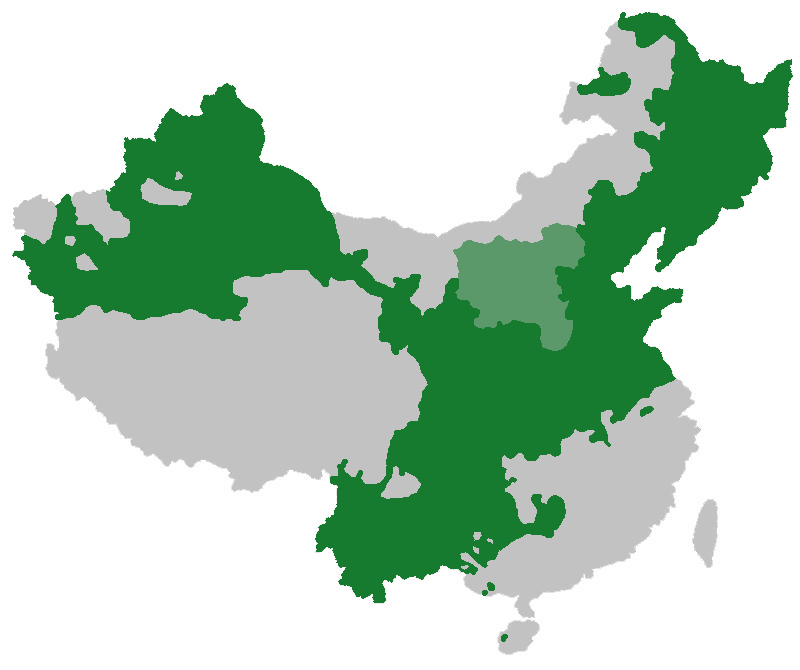
- Mandarin area in China as of 1987. Jin is in light green, as some linguists consider it a non-Mandarin language.

- Countries and regions where Mandarin is spoken as L1 or L2 Majority native language Statutory or de facto national working language More than 1,000,000 speakers More than 500,000 speakers More than 100,000 speakers

Chinese name
- Simplified Chinese: 官话
- Traditional Chinese: 官話
- Literal meaning: Officials' speech
Transcriptions
Standard Mandarin
- Hanyu Pinyin: Guānhuà
- Bopomofo: ㄍㄨㄢ ㄏㄨㄚˋ
- Gwoyeu Romatzyh: Guanhuah
- Wade–Giles: Kuan^{1}-hua^{4}
- Tongyong Pinyin: Guan-huà
- IPA: [kwán.xwâ]
Yue: Cantonese
- Yale Romanization: Gūnwá

Northern Chinese
- Simplified Chinese: 北方话
- Traditional Chinese: 北方話
- Literal meaning: Northern speech
Transcriptions
Standard Mandarin
- Hanyu Pinyin: Běifānghuà
- Bopomofo: ㄅㄟˇㄈㄤ ㄏㄨㄚˋ
- Gwoyeu Romatzyh: Beeifanghuah
- Wade–Giles: Pei^{3}-fang^{1}-hua^{4}
- Tongyong Pinyin: Běi-fang-huà
- IPA: [pèɪ.fáŋ.xwâ]
Yue: Cantonese
- Yale Romanization: Bākfōngwá

A speaker from Tanghe (Central Plains Mandarin)

Mandarin (/ˈmændərɪn/ MAN-dər-in) is the largest branch of the Sinitic languages. Mandarin varieties are natively spoken by 71 percent of all Chinese speakers, spread over a large geographical area that stretches from Yunnan in the southwest to Xinjiang in the northwest and Heilongjiang in the northeast. Its spread is generally attributed to the overall greater ease of travel in the North China Plain compared to the more mountainous south, combined with the relatively recent spread of northern varieties to frontier areas. Many varieties of Mandarin, such as those of the Southwest and the Lower Yangtze, are not mutually intelligible with the Beijing dialect. Nevertheless, Mandarin as a group is often placed first in lists of languages by number of native speakers (with nearly one billion). Because Mandarin originated in North China and most Mandarin varieties are found north of the Yangtze River, the group is sometimes referred to as Northern Chinese.

Most Mandarin varieties have four lexical tones, alongside unstressed syllables commonly described as having a neutral tone. The final stops of Middle Chinese have disappeared in most of these varieties, but some have merged them as a final glottal stop. Many Mandarin varieties, including that of Beijing, retain retroflex initial consonants, which have been lost in southern Chinese varieties.

The historical capitals of China have been within the Mandarin-speaking area for most of the last two millennia, making these dialects very prestigious. Some form of Mandarin has served as a lingua franca for government officials and the courts since at least the 14th century. In the early 20th century, a standard language based on the Beijing dialect, with elements from other Mandarin varieties, was adopted as the national language. Today, Standard Chinese is the official language of China and Taiwan, one of four official languages of Singapore, and one of six official languages of the United Nations. Increased migration from Mandarin-speaking regions of China and Taiwan since the late 20th century has resulted in the language being one of the more frequently used varieties of Chinese among Chinese diaspora communities. It is also the most commonly taught form of Chinese as a foreign language.

== Name ==
The English word "mandarin" (from Portuguese mandarim, from Malay menteri, from Sanskrit mantrī, mantrin, meaning 'minister or counsellor') originally meant an official of the Ming and Qing empires. (Note: A folk etymology deriving the name from Mǎn dà rén (满大人; 滿大人; 'Manchu big man') is without foundation.) Since their native varieties were often mutually unintelligible, these officials communicated using a koiné language based on various northern varieties. When Jesuit missionaries learned this standard language in the 16th century, they called it "Mandarin", from its Chinese name Guānhuà (官话; 官話; 'language of the officials').

In everyday English, "Mandarin" refers to Standard Chinese, which is often called simply "Chinese". Standard Mandarin Chinese is based on Beijing dialect, with some lexical and syntactic influence from other Mandarin dialects. It is the official spoken language of the People's Republic of China (PRC) and Taiwan (Republic of China, ROC), as well as one of the four official languages of Singapore, and a high-prestige minority language in Malaysia. It also functions as the language of instruction in mainland China and Taiwan. It is one of the six official languages of the United Nations, under the name "Chinese". Chinese speakers refer to the modern standard language as Pǔtōnghuà (普通话; 普通話; 'common speech') in mainland China, Guóyǔ (国语; 國語; 'national language') in Taiwan, and Huáyǔ (华语; 華語; 'Huaxia language') in Malaysia and Singapore, but not as Guānhuà (官话; 官話; 'officials' language').

Linguists use the term "Mandarin" to refer to the diverse group of dialects spoken in northern and southwestern China, which Chinese linguists call Guānhuà. The alternative term Běifānghuà (北方话; 北方話; 'Northern dialects'), is used less and less among Chinese linguists. By extension, the term "Old Mandarin" or "Early Mandarin" is used by linguists to refer to the northern dialects recorded in materials from the Yuan dynasty.

Native speakers who are not academic linguists may not recognize that the variants they speak are classified in linguistics as members of "Mandarin" (or so-called "Northern dialects") in a broader sense. Within Chinese social or cultural discourse, there is not a "Mandarin" identity based on language; rather, there are strong regional identities centred on individual dialects because of the wide geographical distribution and cultural diversity of their speakers. Speakers of forms of Mandarin other than the standard typically refer to the variety they speak by a geographic name—for example the Sichuan dialect and the Hebei dialect or Northeastern dialect, all being regarded as distinct from the standard language, with which they may not share much mutual intelligibility.

== History ==
The hundreds of modern local varieties of Chinese developed from regional variants of Old Chinese and Middle Chinese. Traditionally, seven major groups of dialects have been recognized. Aside from Mandarin, the other six are Wu, Gan, and Xiang in central China and Min, Hakka, and Yue on the southeast coast. The Language Atlas of China (1987) distinguishes three further groups: Jin (split from Mandarin), Huizhou in the Huizhou region of Anhui and Zhejiang, and Pinghua in Guangxi and Yunnan.

=== Old Mandarin ===
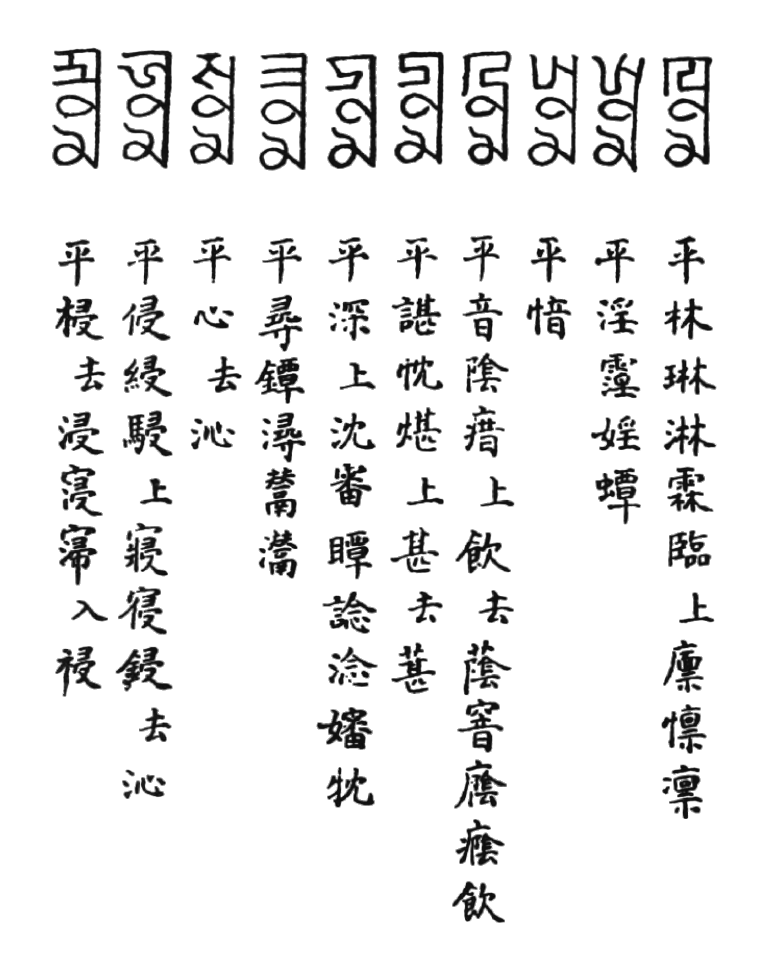
A page of the Menggu Ziyun, covering the syllables tsim to lim

After the fall of the Northern Song (959–1126) and during the reign of the Jin (1115–1234) and Yuan (Mongol) dynasties in northern China, a common form of speech developed based on the dialects of the North China Plain around the capital, a language referred to as Old Mandarin. New genres of vernacular literature were based on this language, including verse, drama and story forms, such as the qu and sanqu poetry.

The rhyming conventions of the new verse were codified in a rime dictionary called the Zhongyuan Yinyun (1324). A radical departure from the rime table tradition that had evolved over the previous centuries, this dictionary contains a wealth of information on the phonology of Old Mandarin. Further sources are the 'Phags-pa script based on the Tibetan alphabet, which was used to write several of the languages of the Mongol empire, including Chinese and the Menggu Ziyun, a rime dictionary based on 'Phags-pa. The rime books differ in some details, but overall show many of the features characteristic of modern Mandarin dialects, such as the reduction and disappearance of final plosives and the reorganization of the Middle Chinese tones.

In Middle Chinese, initial stops and affricates showed a three-way contrast between tenuis, voiceless aspirated and voiced consonants. There were four tones, with the fourth or "entering tone", a checked tone comprising syllables ending in plosives (-p, -t or -k). Syllables with voiced initials tended to be pronounced with a lower pitch and by the late Tang dynasty, each of the tones had split into two registers conditioned by the initials. When voicing was lost in all languages except the Wu subfamily, this distinction became phonemic and the system of initials and tones was rearranged differently in each of the major groups.

The Zhongyuan Yinyun shows the typical Mandarin four-tone system resulting from a split of the "even" tone and loss of the entering tone, with its syllables distributed across the other tones (though their different origin is marked in the dictionary). Similarly, voiced plosives and affricates have become voiceless aspirates in the "even" tone and voiceless non-aspirates in others, another distinctive Mandarin development. However, the language still retained a final -m, which has merged with -n in modern dialects and initial voiced fricatives. It also retained the distinction between velars and alveolar sibilants in palatal environments, which later merged in most Mandarin dialects to yield a palatal series (rendered j-, q- and x- in pinyin).

The flourishing vernacular literature of the period also shows distinctively Mandarin vocabulary and syntax, though some, such as the third-person pronoun tā (他), can be traced back to the Tang dynasty.

=== Vernacular literature ===
Until the early 20th century, formal writing and even much poetry and fiction was done in Literary Chinese, which was modeled on the classics of the Warring States period and the Han dynasty. Over time, the various spoken varieties diverged greatly from Literary Chinese, which was learned and composed as a special language. Preserved from the sound changes that affected the various spoken varieties, its economy of expression was greatly valued. For example, 翼 (yì; 'wing') is unambiguous in written Chinese, but has over 75 homophones in Standard Chinese.

The literary language was less appropriate for documents that were meant to be performed or recited, such as plays or stories. From at least the Yuan dynasty plays that recounted the subversive tales of China's Robin Hoods to the Ming dynasty novels such as Water Margin, on down to the Qing dynasty novel Dream of the Red Chamber and beyond, there developed a literature in written vernacular Chinese (白话; 白話; báihuà). In many cases, this written language reflected Mandarin varieties and since pronunciation differences were not conveyed in this written form, this tradition had a unifying force across all the Mandarin-speaking regions and beyond.

Hu Shih, a pivotal figure of the first half of the twentieth century, wrote an influential and perceptive study of this literary tradition, entitled "A History of Vernacular Literature" (Báihuà Wénxuéshǐ).

=== Late imperial koiné ===
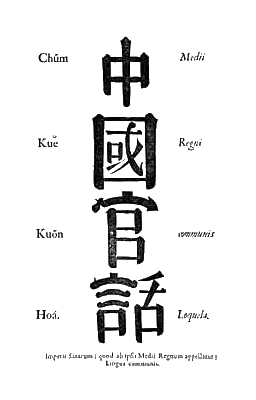
Zhongguo Guanhua (中國官話), or Medii Regni Communis Loquela ("Middle Kingdom's Common Speech"), used on the frontispiece of an early Chinese grammar published by Étienne Fourmont (with Arcadio Huang) in 1742

Until the mid-20th century, most Chinese people living in many parts of South China spoke only their local variety. As a practical measure, officials of the Ming and Qing dynasties carried out the administration of the empire using a common language based on Mandarin varieties, known as Guānhuà. Knowledge of this language was thus essential for an official career, but it was never formally defined.

The Chinese have different languages in different provinces, to such an extent that they cannot understand each other.... [They] also have another language which is like a universal and common language; this is the official language of the mandarins and of the court; it is among them like Latin among ourselves.... Two of our fathers [Michele Ruggieri and Matteo Ricci] have been learning this mandarin language...

— Alessandro Valignano, Historia del principio y progresso de la Compañía de Jesús en las Indias Orientales I:28 (1542–1564)

Officials varied widely in their pronunciation; in 1728, the Yongzheng Emperor, unable to understand the accents of officials from Guangdong and Fujian, issued a decree requiring the governors of those provinces to provide for the teaching of proper pronunciation. Although the resulting Academies for Correct Pronunciation (正音書院; Zhèngyīn Shūyuàn) were short-lived, the decree did spawn a number of textbooks that give some insight into the ideal pronunciation. Common features included:

- loss of the Middle Chinese voiced initials except for v-
- merger of -m finals with -n
- the characteristic Mandarin four-tone system in open syllables, but retaining a final glottal stop in "entering tone" syllables
- retention of the distinction between palatalized velars and dental affricates, the source of the spellings "Peking" and "Tientsin" for modern "Beijing" and "Tianjin".

As the last two of these features indicate, this language was a koiné based on dialects spoken in the Nanjing area, though not identical to any single dialect. This form remained prestigious long after the capital moved to Beijing in 1421, though the speech of the new capital emerged as a rival standard. As late as 1815, Robert Morrison based the first English–Chinese dictionary on this koiné as the standard of the time, though he conceded that the Beijing dialect was gaining in influence. By the middle of the 19th century, the Beijing dialect had become dominant and was essential for any business with the imperial court.

=== Standard Chinese ===
The variant of Mandarin as spoken by educated classes in Beijing was made the official language of China by the Qing dynasty in the early 1900s and the successive Republican government. In the early years of the Republic of China, intellectuals of the New Culture Movement, such as Hu Shih and Chen Duxiu, successfully campaigned for the replacement of Literary Chinese as the written standard by written vernacular Chinese, which was based on northern dialects. A parallel priority was the definition of a standard national language (traditional Chinese: 國語; simplified Chinese: 国语; pinyin: Guóyǔ; Wade–Giles: Kuo²-yü³). After much dispute between proponents of northern and southern dialects and an abortive attempt at an artificial pronunciation, the National Language Unification Commission finally settled on the Beijing dialect in 1932. The People's Republic, founded in 1949, retained this standard, calling it pǔtōnghuà (普通话; 普通話; 'common speech'). Some 54% of speakers of Mandarin varieties could understand the standard language in the early 1950s, rising to 91% in 1984. Nationally, the proportion understanding the standard rose from 41% to 90% over the same period.

This standard language is now used in education, the media, and formal occasions in both mainland China and Taiwan, as well as among the Chinese community of Singapore. However, in other parts of the Chinese-speaking world, namely Hong Kong and Macau, the standard form of Chinese used in education, the media, formal speech, and everyday life remains the local Cantonese because of their colonial and linguistic history. While Standard Mandarin is now the medium of instruction in schools throughout China, it still has yet to gain traction as a common language among the local population in areas where Mandarin dialects are not native. In these regions, people may be either diglossic or speak the standard language with a notable accent. However, since the start of the 21st century, there has been an effort of mass education in Standard Mandarin Chinese and discouragement of local language usage by the Chinese government in order to erase these regional differences.

From an official point of view, the mainland Chinese and the Taiwanese governments maintain their own forms of the standard under different names. The codified forms of both Pǔtōnghuà and Guóyǔ base their phonology on the Beijing accent, and also take some elements from other sources, and deviate from the Beijing dialect in vocabulary, grammar, and pragmatics. Comparison of dictionaries produced in the two areas will show that there are few substantial differences. However, both versions of "school-standard" Chinese are often quite different from the Mandarin varieties that are spoken in accordance with regional habits, and neither is wholly identical to the Beijing dialect.

The written forms of Standard Chinese are also essentially equivalent, although simplified characters are used in mainland China and Singapore, while traditional characters remain in use in Taiwan, Hong Kong, and Macau. Singapore has followed mainland China in officially adopting simplified characters.

== Geographic distribution ==
Mandarin is spoken across northern and southwestern China, with some pockets in neighbouring countries. Unlike their compatriots on the southeast coast, few Mandarin speakers engaged in overseas emigration until the late 20th century, but there are now significant communities of them in cities across the world.

=== Mainland China ===
Most Han Chinese living in northern and southwestern China are native speakers of a dialect of Mandarin. The North China Plain provided few barriers to migration, leading to relative linguistic homogeneity over a wide area in northern China. In contrast, the mountains and rivers of southern China have spawned the other six major groups of Chinese varieties, with great internal diversity, particularly in Fujian.

However, the varieties of Mandarin cover a huge area containing nearly a billion people. As a result, there are pronounced regional variations in pronunciation, vocabulary, and grammar, and many Mandarin varieties are not mutually intelligible. (Note: For example: In the early 1950s, only 54% of people in the Mandarin-speaking area could understand Standard Chinese, which was based on the Beijing dialect.; "Hence we see that even Mandarin includes within it an unspecified number of languages, very few of which have ever been reduced to writing, that are mutually unintelligible."; "the common term assigned by linguists to this group of languages implies a certain homogeneity which is more likely to be related to the sociopolitical context than to linguistic reality, since most of those varieties are not mutually intelligible."; "A speaker of only standard Mandarin might take a week or two to comprehend even simple Kunminghua with ease—and then only if willing to learn it."; "without prior exposure, speakers of different Mandarin dialects often have considerable difficulty understanding each other's local vernacular even if they come from the same province, provided that two or more distinct groups of Mandarin are spoken therein. In some cases, mutual intelligibility is not guaranteed even if the Mandarin dialects concerned belong to the same group and are spoken within the same province. As reported by a native speaker of the Zhenjiang dialect (a Jianghuai (Lower Yangtze) Mandarin dialect spoken in the Jiangsu province), it is impossible for her to understand the Nantong dialect (another Jianghuai Mandarin dialect spoken around 140 kilometers away in the same province).")

Most of northeast China, except for Liaoning, did not receive significant settlements by Han Chinese until the 18th century, and as a result the Northeastern Mandarin dialects spoken there differ little from the Beijing dialect. The Manchu people of the area now speak these dialects exclusively; their native language is only maintained in northwestern Xinjiang, where Xibe, a modern dialect, is spoken.

The frontier areas of northwest China were colonized by speakers of Mandarin dialects at the same time, and the dialects in those areas similarly closely resemble their relatives in the core Mandarin area. The Southwest was settled early, but the population fell dramatically for obscure reasons in the 13th century, and did not recover until the 17th century. The dialects in this area are now relatively uniform. However, long-established cities even very close to Beijing, such as Tianjin, Baoding, Shenyang, and Dalian, have markedly different dialects.

=== Taiwan ===
Standard Mandarin is one of the official languages of Taiwan. The Taiwanese standard of Mandarin differs very little from that of mainland China, with differences largely in some technical vocabulary developed from the 1950s onwards.

While the spoken standard of Taiwanese Mandarin is nearly identical to that of mainland China, the colloquial form has been heavily influenced by other local languages, especially Taiwanese Hokkien. Notable differences include: the merger of retroflex sounds (zh, ch, sh, r) with the alveolar series (z, c, s), frequent mergers of the "neutral tone" with a word's original tone, and absence of erhua. Code-switching between Mandarin and Taiwanese Hokkien is common, as the majority of the population continues to also speak the latter as a native language.

=== Southeast Asia ===
==== Singapore ====
Mandarin is one of the four official languages of Singapore along with English, Malay, and Tamil. Historically, it was seldom used by the Chinese Singaporean community, which primarily spoke the Southern Chinese languages of Hokkien, Teochew, Cantonese, or Hakka. The launch of the Speak Mandarin Campaign in 1979 by the government prioritized the language over traditional vernaculars in an attempt to create a common ethnic language and foster closer connections to China. This has led to a significant increase and presence of Mandarin usage in the country, coupled with a strong decline in usage of other Chinese variants.

Standard Singaporean Mandarin is nearly identical to the standards of China and Taiwan, with minor vocabulary differences. It is the Mandarin variant used in education, media, and official settings. Meanwhile, a colloquial form called Singdarin is used in informal daily life and is heavily influenced in terms of both grammar and vocabulary by local languages such as Cantonese, Hokkien, and Malay. Instances of code-switching with English, Hokkien, Cantonese, Malay, or a combination of any of these is also common.

==== Malaysia ====
In Malaysia, Mandarin has been adopted by local Chinese-language schools as the medium of instruction with the standard based on that of Singapore. However, it is not as widespread in daily life among the Malaysian Chinese community, as Hokkien speakers continue to form a plurality among the ethnic Chinese population and Cantonese serves as the common language (especially in commerce and local media). An exception is in the state of Johor, where Mandarin is increasingly used alongside Cantonese as a lingua franca in part due to Singaporean influence. As in Singapore, the local colloquial variant of Mandarin exhibits influences from Cantonese and Malay.

==== Myanmar ====
In northern Myanmar, a Southwestern Mandarin variant close to the Yunnanese dialect is spoken by local Chinese and other ethnic groups. In some rebel group-controlled regions, Mandarin also serves as the lingua franca.

=== Central Asia ===
The Dungan people of Kyrgyzstan, Kazakhstan and Uzbekistan are descendants of Hui people who fled to the Russian Empire from Dzungaria in 1877 after the fall of Kashgaria to Qing forces and from the Ili valley after it was ceded to China in the Treaty of Saint Petersburg in 1881. About 500 speakers live in a compact area in Rovensky District, Saratov Oblast in Russia. The Dungan speak two dialects, descended from Central Plains Mandarin dialects of southeast Gansu and southwest Shaanxi, and write their language in the Cyrillic script.

== Classification ==
=== Boundaries ===
The classification of Chinese dialects evolved during the 20th century, and many points remain unsettled. Early classifications tended to follow provincial boundaries or major geographical features.

In 1936, Wang Li produced the first classification based on phonetic criteria, principally the evolution of Middle Chinese voiced initials. His Mandarin group included dialects of northern and southwestern China, as well as those of Hunan and northern Jiangxi. Li Fang-Kuei's classification of 1937 distinguished the latter two groups as Xiang and Gan, while splitting the remaining Mandarin dialects between Northern, Jianghuai and Southwestern Mandarin groups.

The widely accepted seven-group classification of Yuan Jiahua in 1960 kept Xiang and Gan separate, with Mandarin divided into Northern, Northwestern, Southwestern and Jiang–Huai (Lower Yangtze) subgroups. Of Yuan's four Mandarin subgroups, the Northwestern dialects are the most diverse, particularly in the province of Shanxi. The linguist Li Rong proposed that the northwestern dialects of Shanxi and neighbouring areas that retain a final glottal stop in the Middle Chinese entering tone (plosive-final) category should constitute a separate top-level group called Jin. He used this classification in the Language Atlas of China (1987). Many other linguists continue to include these dialects in the Mandarin group, pointing out that the Jianghuai dialects also retain the glottal stop.

The southern boundary of the Mandarin area, with the central Wu, Gan and Xiang groups, is weakly defined due to centuries of diffusion of northern features. Many border varieties have a mixture of features that make them difficult to classify. The boundary between Southwestern Mandarin and Xiang is particularly weak, and in many early classifications the two were not separated. Zhou Zhenhe and You Rujie include the New Xiang dialects within Southwestern Mandarin, treating only the more conservative Old Xiang dialects as a separate group. The Huizhou dialects have features of both Mandarin and Wu, and have been assigned to one or other of these groups or treated as separate by various authors. Li Rong and the Language Atlas of China treated it as a separate top-level group, but this remains controversial.

=== Subgroups ===
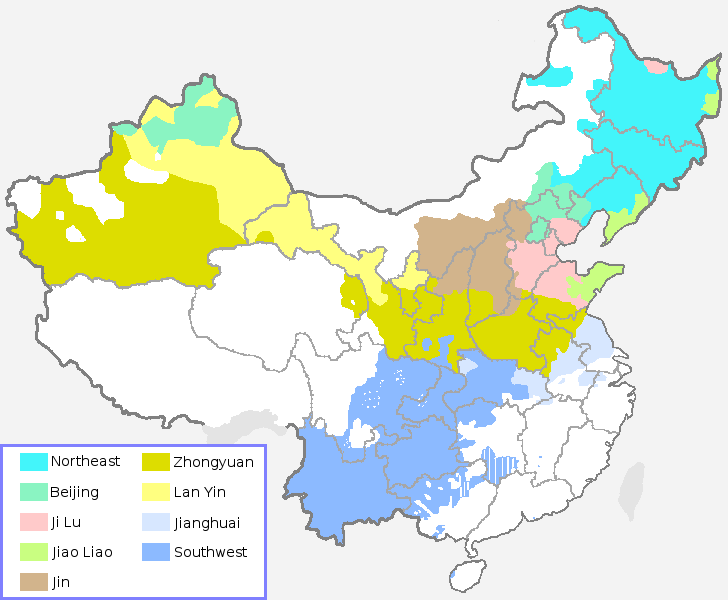
Distribution of the eight subgroups of Mandarin plus Jin Chinese, which many linguists include as part of Mandarin, according to the Language Atlas of China (1987)

The Language Atlas of China calls the remainder of Mandarin a "supergroup", divided into eight dialect groups distinguished by their treatment of the Middle Chinese entering tone (see Tones below): (Note: Speaker numbers are rounded to the nearest million from figures in the revised edition of the Language Atlas of China.)

- Northeastern Mandarin (98 million), spoken in northeast China except the Liaodong Peninsula. This dialect is closely related to Standard Chinese, with little variation in lexicon and very few tonal differences.
- Beijing Mandarin (27 million), spoken in Beijing and environs such as Chengde and northern Hebei, as well as some areas of recent large-scale immigration, such as northern Xinjiang. The Beijing dialect forms the basis of Standard Chinese. This classification is controversial, as a number of researchers view Beijing and Northeastern Mandarin as a single dialect group.
- Jilu Mandarin (89 million), spoken in Hebei ("Ji") and Shandong ("Lu") provinces except the Shandong Peninsula, as well as in few counties of Heilongjiang, due to migration. Includes Tianjin dialect. Tones and vocabulary are markedly different. In general, there is substantial intelligibility with Beijing Mandarin.
- Jiaoliao Mandarin (35 million), spoken in Shandong (Jiaodong) and Liaodong Peninsulas, as well as in few counties of Heilongjiang, due to migration. Very noticeable tonal changes, different in "flavour" from Ji–Lu Mandarin, but with more variance. There is moderate intelligibility with Beijing.
- Central Plains Mandarin (186 million), spoken in Henan province, the central parts of Shaanxi in the Yellow River valley, eastern Gansu, as well as southern Xinjiang, due to recent migration. There are significant phonological differences, with partial intelligibility with Beijing. The Dungan language spoken in Kazakhstan and Kyrgyzstan belongs to this group. Dungan speakers such as the poet Iasyr Shivaza have reported being understood by speakers of the Beijing dialect, but not vice versa.
- Lanyin Mandarin (17 million), spoken in central and western Gansu province (with capital Lanzhou) and Ningxia autonomous region (with capital Yinchuan), as well as northern Xinjiang.
- Jianghuai Mandarin (or Lower Yangtze Mandarin, 86 million), spoken in the parts of Jiangsu and Anhui on the north bank of the Yangtze, as well as some areas on the south bank, such as Nanjing in Jiangsu, Jiujiang in Jiangxi, etc. There are significant phonological and lexical changes to varying degrees, and intelligibility with Beijing is limited. Jianghuai Mandarin has been significantly influenced by Wu Chinese.
- Southwestern Mandarin (260 million), spoken in the provinces of Hubei, Sichuan, Guizhou, Yunnan, and the Mandarin-speaking areas of Hunan, Guangxi and southern Shaanxi. There are sharp phonological, lexical, and tonal changes, and intelligibility with Beijing is limited to varying degrees.

The Atlas also includes several unclassified Mandarin dialects spoken in scattered pockets across southeastern China, such as Nanping in Fujian and Dongfang on Hainan. Another Mandarin variety of uncertain classification is apparently Gyami, recorded in the 19th century in the Tibetan foothills, who the Chinese apparently did not recognize as Chinese. Some northwestern Mandarin varieties in the Qinghai–Gansu sprachbund have undergone drastic changes in phonology, lexicon and grammar.

== Phonology ==
A syllable consists maximally of an initial consonant, a medial glide, a vowel, a coda, and tone. In the traditional analysis, the medial, vowel and coda are combined as a final. Not all combinations occur. For example, Standard Chinese (based on the Beijing dialect) has about 1,200 distinct syllables.

Phonological features that are generally shared by the Mandarin dialects include:

- the palatalization of velar consonants and alveolar sibilants when they occur before palatal glides;
- one syllable contains maximum four phonemes (maximum three vowels and no consonant cluster)
- the disappearance of final stop consonants and /-m/ (although in many Jianghuai Mandarin and Jin Chinese dialects, an echo of the final stops is preserved as a glottal stop);
- the presence of retroflex consonants (although these are absent in many Southwestern and Northeastern Mandarin dialects);
- the historical devoicing of stops and sibilants (also common to most non-Mandarin varieties).

=== Initials ===
The maximal inventory of initials of a Mandarin dialect is as follows, with bracketed pinyin spellings given for those present in the standard language:

		Labial	Apical		Retroflex	(Alveolo-) palatal	Velar
		Labial	plain	sibilant	Retroflex	(Alveolo-) palatal	Velar
Plosive/ Affricate	tenuis	p ⟨b⟩	t ⟨d⟩	t͡s ⟨z⟩	ʈ͡ʂ ⟨zh⟩	t͡ɕ ⟨j⟩	k ⟨g⟩
Plosive/ Affricate	aspirated	pʰ ⟨p⟩	tʰ ⟨t⟩	t͡sʰ ⟨c⟩	ʈ͡ʂʰ ⟨ch⟩	t͡ɕʰ ⟨q⟩	kʰ ⟨k⟩
Fricative		f ⟨f⟩		s ⟨s⟩	ʂ ⟨sh⟩	ɕ ⟨x⟩	x ⟨h⟩
Nasal		m ⟨m⟩	n ⟨n⟩				ŋ
Approximant		w ⟨w⟩	l ⟨l⟩		ɻ ~ ʐ ⟨r⟩	j ⟨y⟩	

- Most Mandarin-speaking areas distinguish between the retroflex initials /ʈʂ ʈʂʰ ʂ/ from the apical sibilants /ts tsʰ s/, though they often have a different distribution than in the standard language. In most dialects of the southeast and southwest the retroflex initials have merged with the alveolar sibilants, so that zhi becomes zi, chi becomes ci, and shi becomes si.
- The alveolo-palatal sibilants /tɕ tɕʰ ɕ/ are the result of merger between the historical palatalized velars /kj kʰj xj/ and palatalized alveolar sibilants /tsj tsʰj sj/. In about 20% of dialects, the alveolar sibilants did not palatalize, remaining separate from the alveolo-palatal initials. (The unique pronunciation used in Peking opera falls into this category.) On the other side, in some dialects of eastern Shandong, the velar initials did not undergo palatalization.
- Many southwestern Mandarin dialects mix /f/ and /xw/, substituting one for the other in some or all cases. For example, fei /fei/ 'to fly' and hui /xwei/ 'grey' may be merged in these areas.
- In some dialects, initial /l/ and /n/ are not distinguished. In Southwestern Mandarin, these sounds usually merge to /n/; in Jianghuai Mandarin, they usually merge to /l/.
- People in many Mandarin-speaking areas may use different initial sounds where Beijing uses initial r- /ɻ/. Common variants include /j/, /l/, /n/ and /w/.
- Some dialects have initial /ŋ/ corresponding to the zero initial of the standard language. This initial is the result of a merger of the Middle Chinese zero initial with /ŋ/ and /ʔ/.
- Many dialects of Northwestern and Central Plains Mandarin have /pf pfʰ f v/ where Beijing has /tʂw tʂʰw ʂw ɻw/. Examples include /pfu/ 'pig' for standard zhū 豬 /tʂu/, /fei/ 'water' for standard shuǐ 水 /ʂwei/, /vã/ 'soft' for standard ruǎn 軟 /ɻwan/.

=== Finals ===
Most Mandarin dialects have three medial glides, /j/, /w/ and /ɥ/ (spelled i, u and ü in pinyin), though their incidence varies. The medial /w/, is lost after apical initials in several areas. Thus Southwestern Mandarin has /tei/ 'correct' where the standard language has dui /twei/. Southwestern Mandarin also has /kai kʰai xai/ in some words where the standard has jie qie xie /tɕjɛ tɕʰjɛ ɕjɛ/. This is a stereotypical feature of southwestern Mandarin, since it is so easily noticeable. E.g. hai 'shoe' for standard xie, gai 'street' for standard jie.

Mandarin dialects typically have relatively few vowels. Syllabic fricatives, as in standard zi and zhi, are common in Mandarin dialects, though they also occur elsewhere. The Middle Chinese off-glides /j/ and /w/ are generally preserved in Mandarin dialects, yielding several diphthongs and triphthongs in contrast to the larger sets of monophthongs common in other dialect groups (and some widely scattered Mandarin dialects).

The Middle Chinese coda /m/ was still present in Old Mandarin, but has merged with /n/ in the modern dialects. In some areas (especially the southwest) final /ŋ/ has also merged with /n/. This is especially prevalent in the rhyme pairs -en/-eng /ən əŋ/ and -in/-ing /in iŋ/. As a result, jīn 'gold' and jīng 'capital' merge in those dialects.

The Middle Chinese final stops have undergone a variety of developments in different Mandarin dialects (see Tones below). In Jianghuai dialects and some north-western dialects they have merged as a final glottal stop. In other dialects they have been lost, with varying effects on the vowel. As a result, Beijing Mandarin and Northeastern Mandarin underwent more vowel mergers than many other varieties of Mandarin. For example:

Character	Meaning	Standard (Beijing)		Beijing, Harbin Colloquial	Jinan (Ji–Lu)	Xi'an (Central Plains)	Chengdu (Southwestern)	Yangzhou (Jianghuai)	Middle Chinese Reconstructed
Character	Meaning	Pinyin	IPA	Beijing, Harbin Colloquial	Jinan (Ji–Lu)	Xi'an (Central Plains)	Chengdu (Southwestern)	Yangzhou (Jianghuai)	Middle Chinese Reconstructed
课	'lesson'	kè	kʰɤ	kʰɤ	kʰə	kʰwo	kʰo	kʰo	kʰɑ
客	'guest'	kè	kʰɤ	tɕʰie (Note: The development is purely due to the preservation of an early glide which later became /j/ and triggered palatalization, and does not indicate the absence of a vowel merger.)	kʰei	kʰei	kʰe	kʰəʔ	kʰɰak
果	'fruit'	guǒ	kwo	kwo	kwə	kwo	ko	ko	kwɑ
国	'country'	guó	kwo	kwo	kwə	kwei	kwe	kɔʔ	kwək

R-coloring, a characteristic feature of Mandarin, works quite differently in the southwest. Whereas Beijing dialect generally removes only a final /j/ or /n/ when adding the rhotic final -r /ɻ/, in the southwest the -r replaces nearly the entire rhyme.

=== Tones ===
The syllable ma with each of the primary tones in Standard Mandarin Chinese

In general, no two Mandarin-speaking areas have exactly the same set of tone values, but most Mandarin-speaking areas have very similar tone distribution. For example, the dialects of Jinan, Chengdu, Xi'an and so on all have four tones that correspond quite well to the Beijing dialect tones of [˥] (55), [˧˥] (35), [˨˩˦] (214), and [˥˩] (51). The exception to this rule lies in the distribution of syllables formerly ending in a stop consonant, which are treated differently in different dialects of Mandarin.

Middle Chinese stops and affricates had a three-way distinction between tenuis, voiceless aspirate and voiced (or breathy voiced) consonants. In Mandarin dialects the voicing is generally lost, yielding voiceless aspirates in syllables with a Middle Chinese level tone and non-aspirates in other syllables. Of the four tones of Middle Chinese, the level, rising and departing tones have also developed into four modern tones in a uniform way across Mandarin dialects; the Middle Chinese level tone has split into two registers, conditioned on voicing of the Middle Chinese initial, while rising tone syllables with voiced obstruent initials have shifted to the departing tone. The following examples from the standard language illustrate the regular development common to Mandarin dialects (recall that pinyin d denotes a non-aspirate /t/, while t denotes an aspirate /tʰ/):

Reflexes of Middle Chinese initials and tones in modern Mandarin
Middle Chinese tone	"level tone" (píng 平)				"rising tone" (shǎng 上)				"departing tone" (qù 去)			
Example	丹	灘	蘭	彈	亶	坦	懶	但	旦	炭	爛	彈
Middle Chinese	tan	tʰan	lan	dan	tan	tʰan	lan	dan	tan	tʰan	lan	dan
Standard Chinese	dān	tān	lán	tán	dǎn	tǎn	lǎn	dàn		tàn	làn	dàn
Modern Mandarin tone	1 (yīnpíng)		2 (yángpíng)		3 (shǎng)			4 (qù)				

In traditional Chinese phonology, syllables that ended in a stop in Middle Chinese (i.e. /p/, /t/ or /k/) were considered to belong to a special category known as the "entering tone". These final stops have disappeared in most Mandarin dialects, with the syllables distributed over the other four modern tones in different ways in the various Mandarin subgroups.

In the Beijing dialect that underlies the standard language, entering-tone syllables beginning with original voiceless consonants are distributed across the four tones. For example, the three characters 積脊跡, all tsjek in Middle Chinese (William H. Baxter's transcription), are now pronounced jī, jǐ and jì respectively. Older dictionaries such as Mathews' Chinese-English Dictionary mark characters whose pronunciation formerly ended with a stop with a superscript 5; however, this tone number is more commonly used for syllables that always have a neutral tone (see below).

In Jianghuai dialects, a minority of Southwestern dialects (e.g. Minjiang) and Jin Chinese (sometimes considered non-Mandarin), former final stops were not deleted entirely, but were reduced to a glottal stop /ʔ/. (This includes the dialect of Nanjing on which the Postal Romanization was based; it transcribes the glottal stop as a trailing h.) This development is shared with Wu Chinese and is thought to represent the pronunciation of Old Mandarin. In line with traditional Chinese phonology, dialects such as Jianghuai and Minjiang are thus said to have five tones instead of four. However, modern linguistics considers these syllables as having no phonemic tone at all.

Reflexes of the Middle Chinese entering tone in Mandarin dialects
subgroup	Middle Chinese initial		
subgroup	voiceless	voiced sonorant	voiced obstruent
Beijing	1,2,3,4	4	2
Northeastern	mostly 3	4	2
Jiao–Liao	3	4	2
Ji–Lu	1	4	2
Central Plains	1		2
Lan–Yin	4		2
Southwestern	2		
Jianghuai	marked with final glottal stop (rù)		

Although the system of tones is common across Mandarin dialects, their realization as tone contours varies widely:

Phonetic realization of Mandarin tones in principal dialects
Tone name		1 (yīnpíng)	2 (yángpíng)	3 (shǎng)	4 (qù)	marked with glottal stop (rù)
Beijing	Beijing	˥ (55)	˧˥ (35)	˨˩˦ (214)	˥˩ (51)	
Northeastern	Harbin	˦ (44)	˨˦ (24)	˨˩˧ (213)	˥˨ (52)	
Jiao–Liao	Yantai	˧˩ (31)	(˥ (55))	˨˩˦ (214)	˥ (55)	
Ji–Lu	Tianjin	˨˩ (21)	˧˥ (35)	˩˩˧ (113)	˥˧ (53)	
Ji–Lu	Shijiazhuang	˨˧ (23)	˥˧ (53)	˥ (55)	˧˩ (31)	
Central Plains	Zhengzhou	˨˦ (24)	˦˨ (42)	˥˧ (53)	˧˩˨ (312)	
Central Plains	Luoyang	˧˦ (34)	˦˨ (42)	˥˦ (54)	˧˩ (31)	
Central Plains	Xi'an	˨˩ (21)	˨˦ (24)	˥˧ (53)	˦ (44)	
Central Plains	Tianshui	˩˧ (13)		˥˧ (53)	˦ (44)	
Lan–Yin	Lanzhou	˧˩ (31)	˥˧ (53)	˧ (33)	˨˦ (24)	
Lan–Yin	Yinchuan	˦ (44)	˥˧ (53)		˩˧ (13)	
Southwestern	Chengdu	˦ (44)	˨˩ (21)	˥˧ (53)	˨˩˧ (213)	
Southwestern	Xichang	˧ (33)	˥˨ (52)	˦˥ (45)	˨˩˧ (213)	˧˩ʔ (31)
Southwestern	Kunming	˦ (44)	˧˩ (31)	˥˧ (53)	˨˩˨ (212)	
Southwestern	Wuhan	˥ (55)	˨˩˧ (213)	˦˨ (42)	˧˥ (35)	
Southwestern	Liuzhou	˦ (44)	˧˩ (31)	˥˧ (53)	˨˦ (24)	
Jianghuai	Yangzhou	˧˩ (31)	˧˥ (35)	˦˨ (42)	˥ (55)	˥ʔ (5)
Jianghuai	Nantong (Note: Dialects in and around the Nantong area typically have many more than 4 tones, due to influence from the neighbouring Wu dialects.)	˨˩ (21)	˧˥ (35)	˥ (55)	˦˨ (42), ˨˩˧ (213)	˦ʔ (4), ˥ʔ (5)

Many words in Mandarin dialects contain unstressed syllables, which are short and have no inherent tone. Their limited pitch contour is determined by the tone of the preceding stressed syllable. Such atonal syllables also occur in non-Mandarin dialects, but in many southern dialects they are limited to suffixes and particles.

== Vocabulary ==
There are more polysyllabic words in Mandarin than in all other major varieties of Chinese except Shanghainese. This is partly because Mandarin has undergone many more sound changes than southern varieties of Chinese have, and needed to deal with many more homophones. New words have been formed by adding affixes such as lao- 老, -zi 子, -(e)r 儿/兒, and -tou 头/頭, or by compounding, e.g. by combining two words of similar meaning as in cōngmáng 匆忙, made from elements meaning 'hurried' and 'busy'. A distinctive feature of southwestern Mandarin is its frequent use of noun reduplication, which is hardly used in Beijing. In Sichuan, one hears bāobāo 包包 'handbag' where Beijing uses bāor. There are also a small number of words that have been polysyllabic since Old Chinese, such as húdié 蝴蝶 'butterfly'.

The singular pronouns in Mandarin are wǒ 我 'I', nǐ 你 'you', nín 您 'you (formal)', and tā (他, 她 or 它/牠, 'he', 'she', 'it'), with -men 们/們 added for the plural. Further, there is a distinction between the plural first-person pronoun zánmen 咱们/咱們, which is inclusive of the listener, and wǒmen 我们/我們, which may be exclusive of the listener. Dialects of Mandarin agree with each other quite consistently on these pronouns. While the first and second person singular pronouns are cognate with forms in other varieties of Chinese, the rest of the pronominal system is a Mandarin innovation (e.g., Shanghainese has non 侬儂 'you' and yi 伊 'he, she').

Because of contact with Mongolian and Manchurian peoples, Mandarin (especially the Northeastern varieties) has some loanwords from these languages not present in other varieties of Chinese, such as hútòng (胡同) 'alley'. Southern Chinese varieties have borrowed from Tai, Austroasiatic, and Austronesian languages.

There are also many Chinese words which come from foreign languages such as gāo'ěrfū 高尔夫 from "golf", bǐjīní 比基尼 from "bikini", and hànbǎo bāo from "hamburger".

In general, the greatest variation occurs in slang, in kinship terms, in names for common crops and domesticated animals, for common verbs and adjectives, and other such everyday terms. The least variation occurs in "formal" vocabulary—terms dealing with science, law, or government.

== Grammar ==
Chinese varieties of all periods are considered prime examples of analytic languages, relying on word order and particles instead of inflection or affixes to provide grammatical information such as person, number, tense, mood, or case. Although modern varieties, including the Mandarin dialects, use a small number of particles in a similar fashion to suffixes, they are still strongly analytic.

The basic word order of subject–verb–object is common across Chinese dialects, but there are variations in the order of the two objects of ditransitive sentences. In northern dialects the indirect object precedes the direct object (as in English), for example in the Standard Chinese sentence:

我 给 你 一本 书
wǒ gěi nǐ yìběn shū
I give you a book

In southern dialects, as well as many southwestern and Jianghuai dialects, the objects occur in the reverse order.

我 给 一本 书 给 你
wǒ gěi yìběn shū gěi nǐ
I give a book to you

Most varieties of Chinese use post-verbal particles to indicate aspect, but the particles used vary. Most Mandarin dialects use the particle le (了) to indicate the perfective aspect and zhe (着; 著) for the progressive aspect. Other Chinese varieties tend to use different particles, e.g. Cantonese zo^{2} (咗) and gan^{2} (紧; 緊) respectively. The experiential aspect particle guo (过; 過) is used more widely, except in Southern Min.

The subordinative particle de (的) is characteristic of Mandarin dialects. Some southern dialects, and a few Jianghuai dialects, preserve an older pattern of subordination without a marking particle, while in others a classifier fulfils the role of the Mandarin particle.

Especially in conversational Chinese, sentence-final particles alter the inherent meaning of a sentence. Like much vocabulary, particles can vary a great deal with regards to the locale. For example, the particle ma (嘛), which is used in most northern dialects to denote obviousness or contention, is replaced by yo (喲; 哟) in southern usage.

Some characters in Mandarin can be combined with others to indicate a particular meaning just like prefix and suffix in English. For example, the suffix -er which means the person who is doing the action, e.g. teacher, person who teaches. In Mandarin the character 師 has the same function, it is combined with 教, which means 'teach', to form the word 'teacher'.

List of several common Chinese prefixes and suffixes:

Affix	Pronunciation	Gloss	Example	Example gloss
们; 們	men	plural for human nouns, same as -s, -es	学生们; 學生們, 朋友们; 朋友們	'students', 'friends'
可	kě	same as -able	可信, 可笑, 可靠	'trusty', 'laughable', 'reliable'
重	chóng	same as re- (again)	重做, 重建, 重新	'redo', 'rebuild', 'renew'
第	dì	same as -th, -st, -nd	第二, 第一	'second', 'first'
老	lǎo	old, or show respect to a certain type of person	老头; 老頭, 老板; 老闆, 老师; 老師	'old man', 'boss', 'teacher'
化	huà	same as -ize, -en	公式化、制度化、強化	'officialize', 'systemize', 'strengthen'
家	jiā	same as -er or expert	作家、科學家 [科学家]、藝術家 [艺术家]	'writer', 'scientist', 'artist'
性	xìng	same as -ness, -ability	可靠性、實用性 [实用性]、可理解性	'reliability', 'usability', 'understand-ability'
鬼	guǐ	usually used in a disparaging way, similar to -aholic	煙鬼、酒鬼、膽小鬼 [胆小鬼]	'smoker', 'alcoholic', 'coward'
匠	jiàng	a technician in a certain field	花匠, 油漆匠, 木匠	'gardener', 'painter', 'carpenter
迷	mí	an enthusiast	戏迷; 戲迷, 球迷, 歌迷	'theater fan', 'sports fan', 'groupie (of a musician)'
师; 師	shī	suffix for occupations	教师; 教師, 厨师; 廚師, 律师]; 律師	'teacher', 'chef', 'lawyer'

== Example text ==
From Article 1 of the Universal Declaration of Human Rights in Beijing Mandarin, the basis of Standard Chinese (in Traditional Chinese):

人人 生 而 自由, 在 尊嚴 和 權利 上 一律 平等。 他們 賦有 理性 和 良心, 並 應 以 兄弟 關係 的 精神 相 對待。
Rénrén shēng ér zìyóu, zài zūnyán hé/hàn quánlì shàng yīlǜ píngděng. Tāmen fùyǒu lǐxìng hé/hàn liángxīn, bìng yīng yǐ xiōngdì guānxì de jīngshén xiāng duìdài.
All human beings are born free and equal in dignity and rights. They are endowed with reason and conscience and should act towards one another in a spirit of brotherhood.

== See also ==
- Chinese dictionary
- Transcription into Chinese characters
- Written Chinese
- Languages of China
- List of varieties of Chinese
- Linguistic Atlas of Chinese Dialects
- List of languages by number of native speakers
