= Svetlana Rimsky-Korsakoff =

Chinese-born Russian scholar

- Born: 1931 (age 94–95); Harbin, Heilongjiang, Republic of China
- Other name: Vieta Dyer

Academic background
- Education: Fu Jen Catholic University; Georgetown University (Master); Australian National University (PhD)

Svetlana Rimsky-Korsakoff (also known as Vieta Dyer; born 1931) is a scholar of Russian descent. She grew up in China during her early years but later left the country. She is well known for her research on the Dungan people.

== Biography ==
Rimsky-Korsakoff was born in Harbin, as the daughter of Nicolai Rimsky-Korsakoff, a White Army officer who settled in Harbin after the Russian Revolution. After Rimsky-Korsakoff's birth, Nicolai took the family to Peking, where Svetlana received a mixed Russian-Chinese education. After the Marco Polo Bridge incident, Nicolai again fled with his family to Yunnan, where he obtained Chinese citizenship.

In 1945, Japan surrendered and the Rimsky-Korsakoff family returned to Beijing. After returning to Peking, Svetlana attended the Fu Jen Catholic University in Beijing. Here she witnessed the conflict between the Communists and the Kuomintang and was present during the siege of the Fu Jen University campus by Communist forces and was forced to participate in the anti-missionary movement under Mao Zedong.

In 1949, when the People's Republic of China was founded, the Rimsky-Korsakoff family was stripped of their Chinese citizenship, and after a period of financial and psychological hardship, the family fled the country on a boat with the last missionaries expelled from China.

In the 1960s, Rimsky-Korsakoff enrolled at Georgetown University in Washington, D.C., to pursue a master's degree in Asian languages. It was here that she met Paul Serruys, who, after learning about Rimsky-Korsakoff's background, suggested that Svetlana study the languages of the Dungans, a Chinese minority in Central Asia. In 1964, Svetlana delivered her master's thesis, "The Dungan Dialect: Introduction and Morphology".

After graduating from Georgetown, she returned to Australia and taught Chinese at the Australian National University while pursuing her PhD. She initially wanted to work on Classic of Filial Piety, but then turned to a 13th-century Korean Chinese manual, Lao Ch'i-ta. In 1983, she submitted her doctoral thesis. During this period, she also conducted research on the Dungans and published a number of papers.
