= Mukhamed Tsikanov =

- Циканов Мухамед Мухадинович
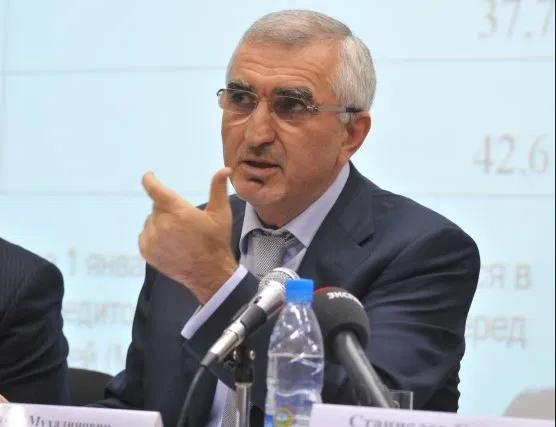

Kabardino-Balkarian Republic, Minister of Economics
- In office 1993–1997

Deputy Minister of Economy of Russia
- In office 1997–2000

Deputy Minister of Economic Development and Trade of Russia
- In office 2000–2004

Personal details
- Born: 6 April 1955 (age 71)
- Children: 5
- Parent: Tsikanov Mohaddin Mamsurovich (father)
- Education: Kyrgyz National University, Moscow State University

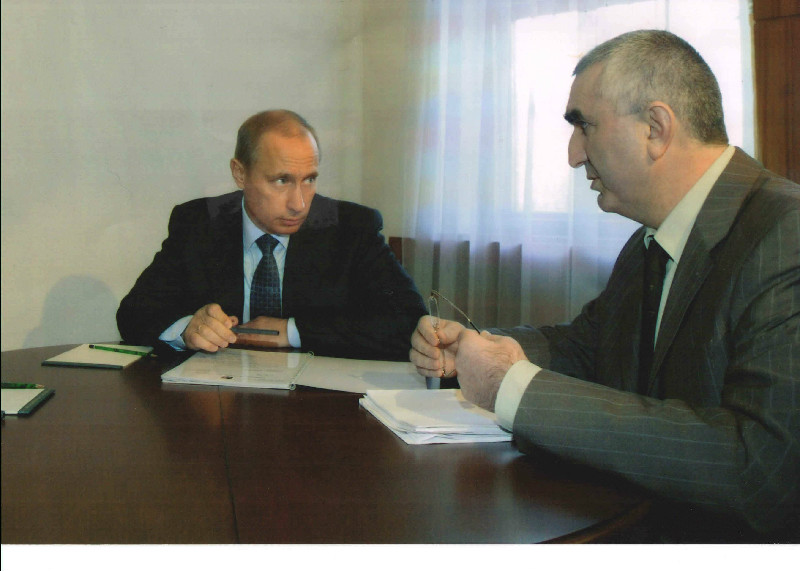
With the president of the Russian Federation, Vladimir Putin

== About ==
Tsikanov Mukhamed Mukhadinovich - Russian statesman, active state advisor of the Russian Federation, doctor of Economics, Professor, businessman.

== Education ==
- Kyrgyz National University
- Engineering stream of Lomonosov Moscow State University

=== Academic degree ===
Doctor of Economics. Professor.

=== Biography ===
Was born on April 6, 1955, in Alma-Ata, Kazakhstan. Balkarian by nationality. Graduated from the Kyrgyz State University and the engineering department of the Lomonosov Moscow State University. Doctor of Economics, Professor.

== Academic work ==
1977–1978: Institute of Economics of the Academy of Sciences of the Kyrgyz SSR, junior researcher.

1978–1980: Central Economics and Mathematical Institute(CEMI) of the USSR Academy of Sciences, research trainee;

1980–1983: CEMI of the USSR Academy of Sciences, postgraduate student; defended his Ph.D. thesis;

1984–1988: Kabardino-Balkarian Agrarian University, Associate Professor of the Department of Economics;

1988–1992: Institute for Systems Analysis of Russian Academy of Sciences (ISA RAS) doctoral student; defended his doctoral dissertation there.

1992–1993: Kabardino-Balkarian Agrarian University, Associate Professor, Head of the Department of Management and Law;

2002–2012: Professor of the Higher School of Economics.

Received training in the US and Japan.

About 50 scientific works, in particular, the head of the developers and one of the authors of the monograph "Strategy and Problems of Sustainable Development of Russia in the XXI Century", as well as a member of the main editorial board of the national atlas of Russia.

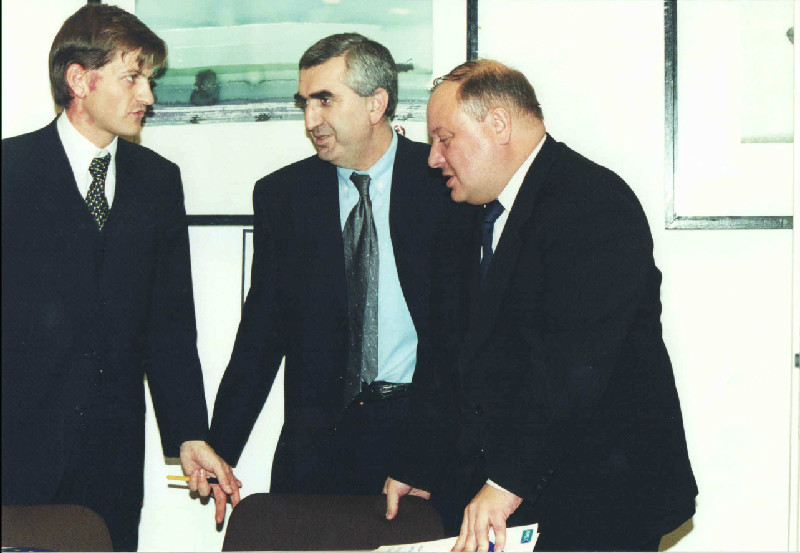
With Yegor Gaidar

=== Work for government ===
05.1993—01.1997: Kabardino-Balkarian Republic, Minister of Economics.

Developed a program for the development of the KBR, which was based on the development of a mountain and recreational complex. The author of the program of the free economic zone of the KBR. Also developed a program for the rehabilitation of the Balkar people; also one of the authors of President Yeltsin's speech made to the Balkar people for deportation in 1944.

08.1997–07.2000: Deputy Minister of Economy of Russia. Participated in the opening of the first Russian polar station SP-32.

08.2000–05.2004: Deputy Minister of Economic Development and Trade of Russia.

06.2004: Has left the government on his own will.

In the Ministry, he was in charge of regional development, subsoil use and ecology. Collaborated with Ye.T. Gaidar, A.B. Chubais, Ye.G. Yasin, Ya.M. Urinson, G.O. Gref. and others. He took an active part in the work of the Government of the Russian Federation, in the reform of the Russian economy. The developer of the regional geostrategic policy of Russia, in particular, regional development programs. The author of the concept and the head of the development of the Forest and Water Codes of the country, the law "On Subsoil", as well as regulatory documents on ecology. One of the initiators for the ratification of the Kyoto Protocol in Russia.

One of the leaders of the preparation group for the summit from Russia on sustainable development in Johannesburg in 2002. He was also the head of the Russian delegation at this summit before the arrival of the country's prime minister.

== Entrepreneurial activity ==
06.2004–08.2005: Senior Vice President of YUKOS-MOSCOW LLC

09.2005–10.2007: General Director of OJSC Elgaugol

10.2007–01.2008: Acting General Director of Yakutugol Holding Company OJSC

01.2008–02.2012: Senior Vice President of one of the largest mining companies in Europe - Mechel OJSC

From 2012–2019 founder and CEO of LLC RSP-M

== Personal life ==
Married. Has 4 daughters and 1 son.

Father - Tsikanov Mukhaddin - a prominent public spiritual leader of the North Caucasus.

Has multiple government awards.
