= Shakarap =

Salad from Central Asia

Shakarap (also spelt shakarob, Tajik: Шакароб; achchiq-chuchuk, achuchuk (Note: Uzbek: achchiq-chuchuk, achuchuk)) is a simple salad originating from Central Asia, which consists of thinly sliced tomatoes and onions, with salt and black pepper. The salad is particularly popular in Tajikistan, Uzbekistan, and Kyrgyzstan.

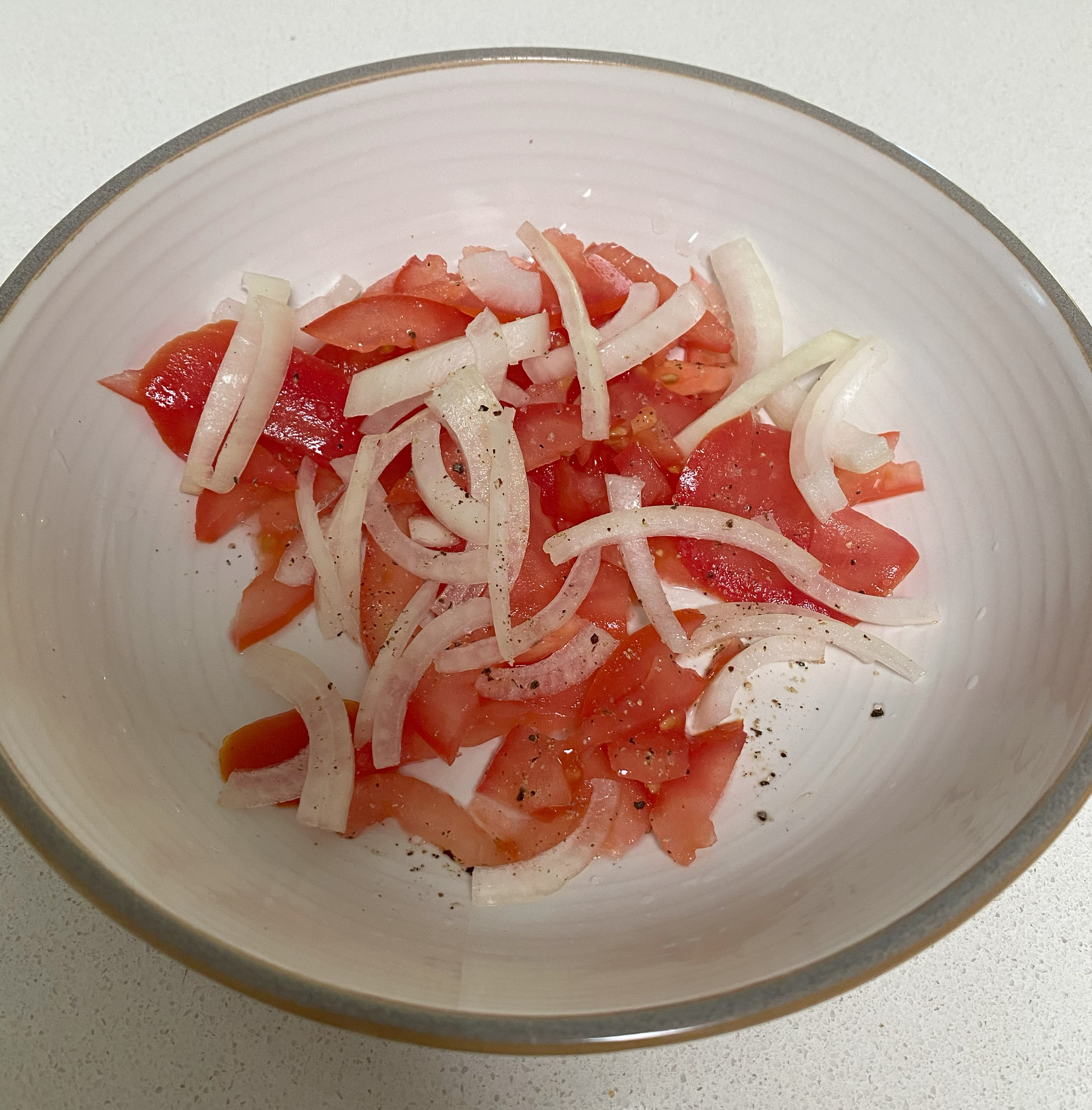
Plate of shakarap

== Variants ==
A variant of shakarap includes cucumbers.

== Serving ==
In Central Asia, shakarap is traditionally served with pilaf.
