= Meet the Barbarians =

2024 comedy film by Julie Delpy

- Theatrical release poster
- French: Les Barbares
- Directed by: Julie Delpy
- Screenplay by: Julie Delpy; Nicolas Slomka; Matthieu Rumani
- Starring: Julie Delpy; Sandrine Kiberlain; Laurent Lafitte
- Cinematography: Georges Lechaptois
- Edited by: Camille Delprat
- Music by: Philippe Jakko
- Production companies: The Film; Le Pacte
- Distributed by: Le Pacte
- Release dates: 6 September 2024 (TIFF); 18 September 2024 (France)
- Running time: 103 minutes
- Country: France
- Language: French

Meet the Barbarians (French: Les Barbares) is a 2024 French comedy drama film directed by Julie Delpy. The film premiered at the Toronto International Film Festival on 6 September 2024. Also selected in the competition section of Cairo International Film Festival 2024.

== Premise ==
In Paimpont, a small community in Brittany, residents prepare to welcome a family of Ukrainian refugees and are surprised when the family that arrives are actually refugees from Syria.

== Cast ==
- Julie Delpy as Joëlle
- Sandrine Kiberlain as Anne Poudoulec
- Laurent Lafitte as Hervé Riou
- Ziad Bakri as Marwan
- Jean-Charles Clichet as Sébastien Lejeune
- India Hair as Géraldine Riou
- Dalia Naous as Louna
- Mathieu Demy as Philippe Poudoulec
- Marc Fraize as Johnny Jannou
- Rita Hayek as Alma
- Farès Helou as Hassan
- Émilie Gavois-Kahn as Marylin Legall
- Albert Delpy as Yves

== Production ==
Principal photography began on 19 June 2023 and concluded on 28 July 2023, taking place entirely in Paimpont (Ille-et-Vilaine).

== Release ==
Meet the Barbarians premiered during the Gala Presentations section of the Toronto International Film Festival on 6 September 2024. The film was released in France on 18 September 2024.
