= Marco Hofschneider =

German actor (born 1969)

- Born: 18 October 1969 (age 56); West Berlin, West Germany

Marco Hofschneider (born 18 October 1969) is a German actor known for his biographical portrayal of Solomon Perel in the 1990 acclaimed (Golden Globe-winning and Academy Award-nominated) World War II film Europa Europa. Since then, he has appeared in many German and British film and television programs. His older brother, René Hofschneider, also appeared in Europa Europa, playing the role of Isaak Perel, Solomon Perel's older brother.

Hofschneider was born in Berlin, Germany.

== Filmography ==
Year	Title	Role	Notes
1990	Europa Europa	Solomon Perel	
1992	Le mirage	Edouard Tümmler	
1994	Foreign Student	Philippe	
1994	Immortal Beloved	Karl van Beethoven	
1996	The Island of Dr. Moreau	M'Ling	
2000	Urban Legends: Final Cut	Simon	
2003	Luther	Ulrick	
2018	Die Haut der Anderen	Pierre	

== Television ==
Year	Title	Role	Notes
1999	Seven Days	Lieutenant Peter Fedorov	Episode: "Last Breath"
2007	Nuclear Secrets	Klaus Fuchs	2 episodes
