= Julie Delpy =

French actress and filmmaker (born 1969)

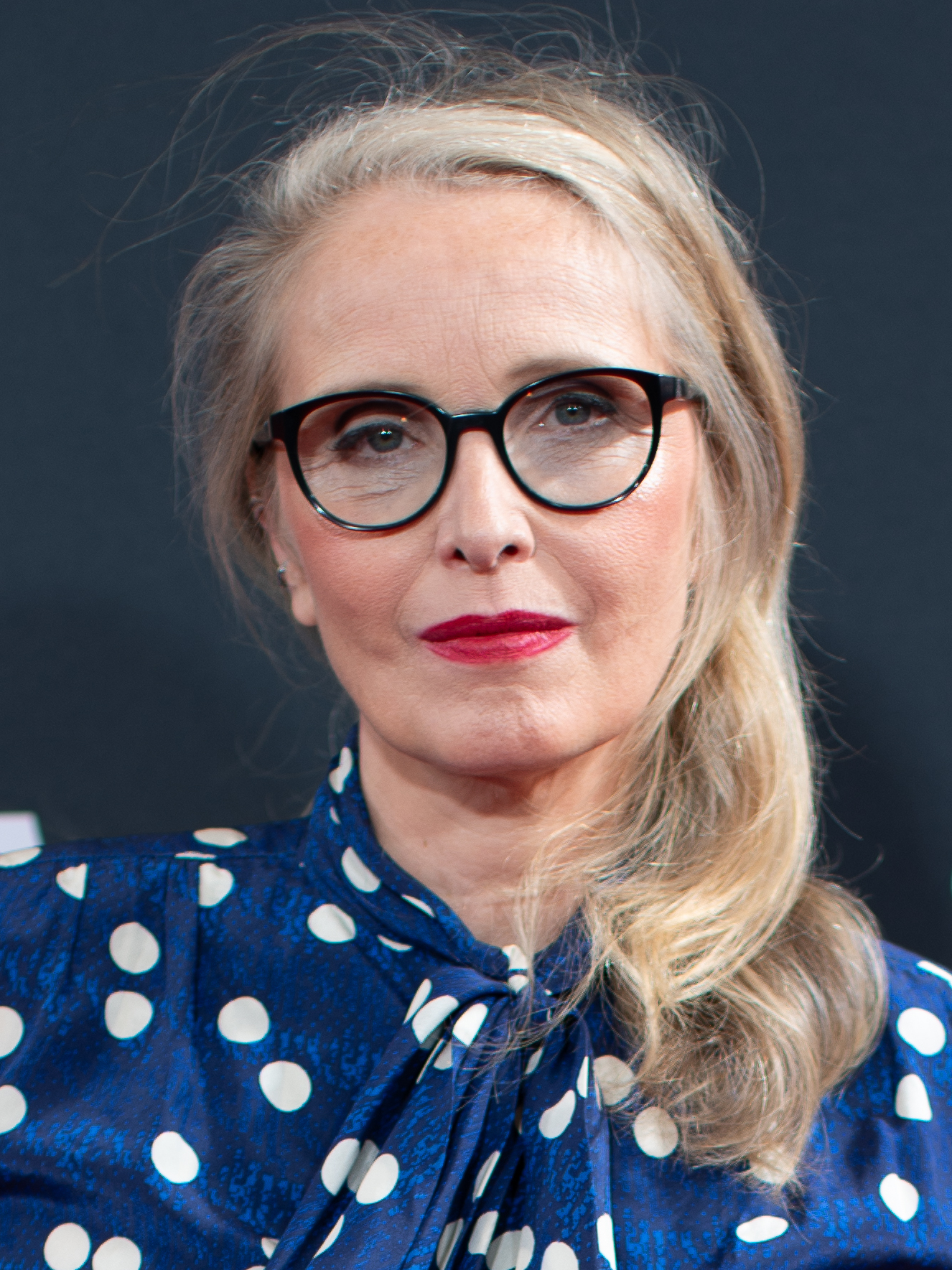
- Delpy at the 2024 Toronto International Film Festival
- Born: 21 December 1969 (age 56); Paris, France
- Citizenship: France; United States
- Education: New York University
- Occupations: Actress; screenwriter; film director; musician
- Years active: 1976–present
- Spouse: Dimitris Birbilis (m. 2015)
- Partner: Marc Streitenfeld (2007–2012)
- Children: 1
- Parents: Albert Delpy (father); Marie Pillet (mother)

Julie Delpy (French: [ʒyli dɛlpi]; born 21 December 1969) is a French actress, screenwriter, film director, and musician. She studied filmmaking at NYU's Tisch School of the Arts and has directed, written, and acted in more than 30 films, including Europa Europa (1990), Voyager (1991), Three Colours: White (1993), the Before trilogy (1995, 2004, 2013), An American Werewolf in Paris (1997), and 2 Days in Paris (2007).

She has been nominated for three César Awards, two Online Film Critics Society Awards, and two Academy Awards. She moved to the United States in 1990 and became a US citizen in 2001.

== Family ==
Delpy was born in Paris, the only child of Albert Delpy, a French actor and theater director born in Cochinchina (present-day Vietnam), and Marie Pillet, a French actress in feature films and the avant-garde theater. Her mother was also known for signing the 1971 Manifesto of the 343, signed by women demanding reproductive rights and admitting to having abortions when they were illegal in France. In Delpy's 2007 film 2 Days in Paris, her character's parents were played by her real parents and the mother acknowledged signing the manifesto, mirroring her real life. Pillet died in 2009.

Julie's parents exposed her to the arts at an early age. She said:

I couldn't hope for better parents. They really raised me with a love of art, bringing me to museums and seeing things that a child wouldn't see at that age. I would see Ingmar Bergman movies when I was 9 and totally go for it. And they would bring me to see Francis Bacon's paintings, which I loved: so dark and at the same time it's so wonderful.

== Career ==
=== Acting ===
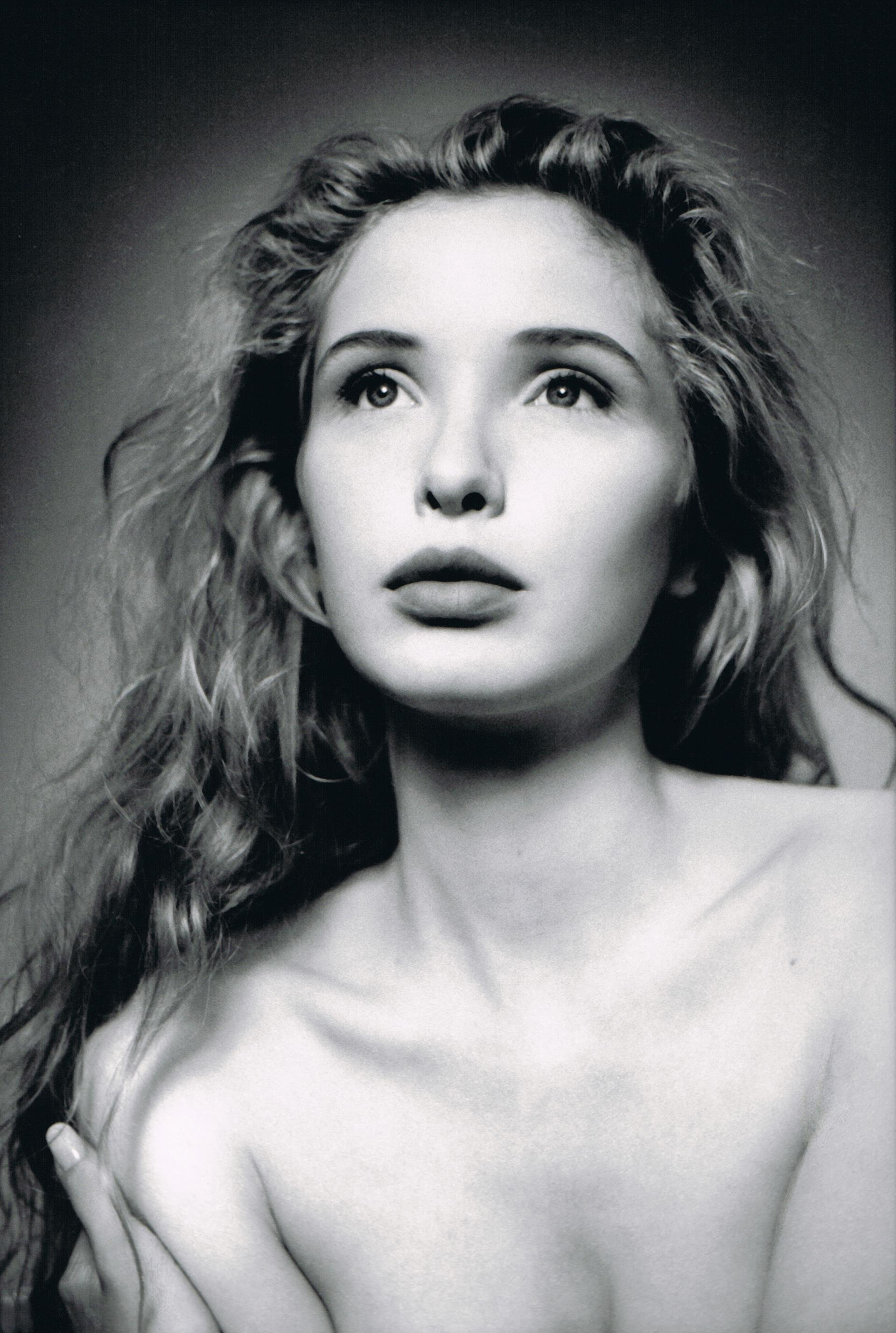
Delpy in 1991

In 1984, at fourteen, Delpy was discovered by film director Jean-Luc Godard, who cast her in Détective (1985). In 1986, she appeared in Léos Carax's Mauvais Sang. In 1987, she played the title role in Bertrand Tavernier's La Passion Béatrice and was nominated for a César Award for Most Promising Actress. She used her money from the film to pay for her first trip to New York City.

Delpy became an international celebrity after starring in the 1990 film Europa Europa, directed by Agnieszka Holland. In the film, she plays a young Hitler Youth member who falls in love with the hero, Solomon Perel, not knowing he is Jewish. She did not speak German, so she performed her role in English and her dialogue was dubbed in. Delpy subsequently appeared in several Hollywood and European films, including Voyager (1991) and The Three Musketeers (1993). In 1993, she was cast by director Krzysztof Kieślowski for the female lead in Three Colours: White, the second film in Kieślowski's Three Colours trilogy. She also appeared briefly in the other two films - Blue and Red - in the same role. That year, she also appeared with Brendan Fraser and Donald Sutherland in the Percy Adlon feature Younger and Younger. In 1994, she starred with Eric Stoltz in Roger Avary's directorial debut Killing Zoe, a cult heist film capturing the Generation X zeitgeist.

Delpy achieved wider recognition for her role opposite Ethan Hawke in director Richard Linklater's Before Sunrise (1995). It received glowing reviews and was considered one of the most significant films of the '90s independent film movement. Its success led to Delpy's casting in the 1997 American film An American Werewolf in Paris. She reprised her Before Sunrise character, Céline, with a brief animated appearance in Waking Life (2001), and again in the sequels Before Sunset (2004) and Before Midnight (2013). Both follow-up movies earned Delpy, who co-wrote the scripts, Academy Award nominations for Best Adapted Screenplay.

In late 2001, she appeared alongside comedian Martin Short in the 30-minute short film CinéMagique, a theatre-show attraction presented several times daily at Walt Disney Studios Park in Disneyland Paris. She attended the park's March 2002 opening and the inauguration of the film-based attraction, where she starred as Marguerite - a female actress with whom Short's character, George, falls in love as he stumbles through countless classic movies. CinéMagique won the 2003 Themed Entertainment Association award for the category Attraction of the Year Award for its Outstanding Theme.

=== Writing and directing ===
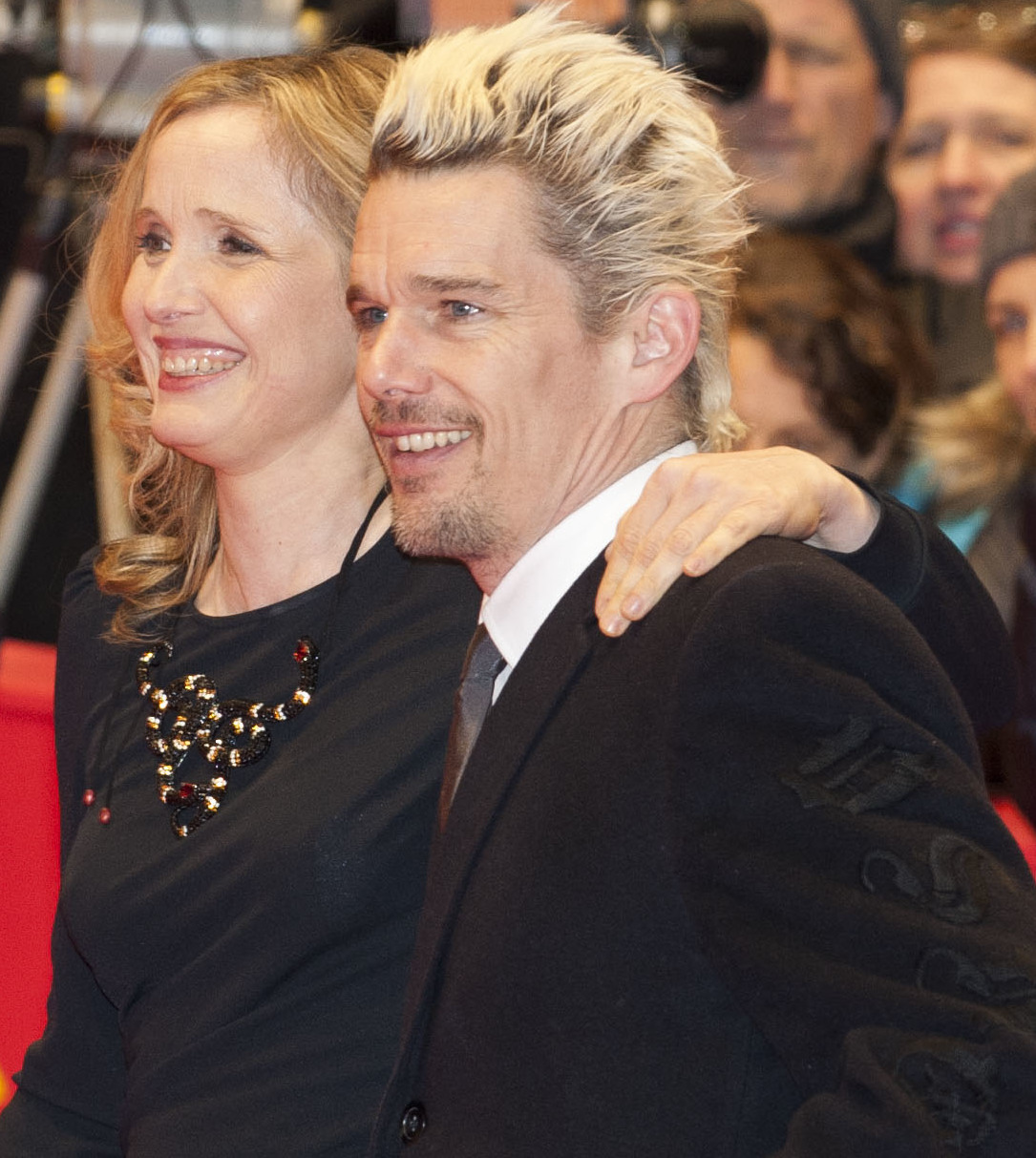
Delpy with frequent co-star Ethan Hawke in 2013

Delpy began being interested in a filmmaking career when she was still a child, and enrolled in a summer directing course at New York University. She wrote and directed the short film Blah Blah Blah in 1995 which screened at the Sundance Film Festival. In 2004, she co-wrote Before Sunset, a sequel to the 1995 film Before Sunrise, with director Linklater and co-star Hawke. Describing the experience, she said: "I'm not a feminist wearing overalls and hating the male gender. But I'm a definite feminist. I don't want to make Before Sunset into a little male fantasy, ever." She received an Academy Award nomination for Best Adapted Screenplay for her work on the film.

Delpy made her feature length directorial debut in 2002 with Looking for Jimmy, which she also wrote, produced, and starred in. In 2007, she directed, wrote, edited and co-produced 2 Days in Paris, co-starring Adam Goldberg. It also features Delpy's real-life parents, Marie Pillet and Albert Delpy, as her character's parents. In 2009, Delpy starred in The Countess as the title character Elizabeth Báthory. Her third film as a director, it also starred Daniel Brühl and William Hurt. In 2011, she wrote and directed Skylab, which received a theatrical release in France but failed to find distribution in the U.S. In 2012, she released 2 Days in New York, a sequel to her 2007 film 2 Days in Paris, starring Delpy and actor Chris Rock in a role she said she wrote specifically for him.

In 2013, she reunited with Linklater and Hawke to write Before Midnight, the sequel to Before Sunrise and Before Sunset. The film premiered at the 2013 Sundance Film Festival. It also screened out of competition at the 63rd Berlin International Film Festival and was released in May 2013. Delpy, Linklater and Hawke were later nominated for Best Adapted Screenplay at the Academy Awards. Responding to criticism of the film's nudity, Delpy said in interview with GQ:

Some people were like, "It's not feminist. You're showing your tits and he's not showing his ass." [But] isn't it the people who are hiding women behind layers of clothes who are the misogynists? I'm a real person, so it's a statement to say, "Alright, I'm a forty-year-old woman, and this is what you get with no plastic surgery."

Lolo was Delpy's second French-language feature film, and the first she had directed since 2 Days in New York. She was also slated to write and direct the HBO movie Cancer Vixen, starring Cate Blanchett as Marisa Acocella Marchetto, a cartoonist for The New Yorker who is diagnosed with cancer. The project has yet to materialize as of 2020. In early 2014, Delpy announced her next writing-directing project would be A Dazzling Display of Splendor and focus on a family of vaudeville performers. It has also failed to enter production as of 2020.

Delpy courted controversy in 2016 when the Oscar nominations included no black honorees. "Two years ago, I said something about the Academy being very white male, which is the reality, and I was slashed to pieces by the media ... It's funny—women can't talk. I sometimes wish I were African-American because people don't bash them afterward." She later apologized for the comment.

In May 2026, she is the patron of the sixth edition of the San Diego French Film Festival with a focus of women voices. She presented the film Meet the Barbarians.

=== Music ===
Delpy is also a musical artist. Three tracks from her 2003 album Julie Delpy — "A Waltz for a Night", "An Ocean Apart", and "Je t'aime tant" — were featured in Before Sunset. She composed the original score for 2 Days in Paris, in which she performed Marc Collin's "Lalala" over the closing credits. She also wrote the music for her 2009 film The Countess.

== Personal life ==
Delpy moved to New York City in 1990, then to Los Angeles a few years later. She has been a naturalized US citizen since 2001, although she also retains her French citizenship. She divides her time between Paris and Los Angeles. From 2007 to 2012, she was in a relationship with German film composer Marc Streitenfeld. Their son was born in January 2009. In 2015, she married Dimitris Birbilis.

Delpy has expressed her commitment to correcting inaccurate assumptions regarding feminism, telling IndieWire: "I'm very dedicated to feminism [but] even if I'm a feminist, I don't think all women are perfect. If we're equal to men, we are also imperfect like men ... [Some men] try to say [feminists] think that women are better than men, and I want to tell them, 'no'". In a 2007 interview with Jan Lisa Huttner, she said: "I was raised by a feminist, so I'm not a feminist. I don't need to be. I’m equal to men. I have no issues with the idea that I'm the same as a man. I have my differences; I have breasts, and different plumbing, different stuff down there. But outside of this, my consciousness, my capacity at creating, my capacity at doing things is the same as a man". However, in a 2012 interview with Emily Greenhouse in The New Yorker, she said: "You know, I've been raised by feminists, and I'm such a feminist, there's no way I'm not going to be feminist, because my core is so deeply feminist that I can even make sexist comments about women, and I feel still a feminist".

Delpy has said she has been plagued by health problems since childhood and had to wear calipers at age eight. She also occasionally experiences migraines and panic-attacks.

In 2022, Delpy was an honoree by the Carnegie Corporation of New York's Great Immigrant Award.

== Filmography ==
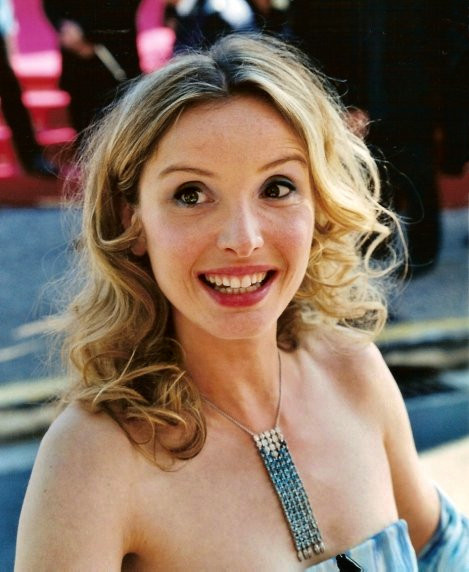
Delpy at the 2002 Cannes Film Festival

Key
†	Denotes films that have not yet been released

Year	Title	Role	Notes
1978	Guerres civiles en France		Segment: "La semaine sanglante" Credited as Julie Pillet
1982	Niveau moins trois		Short film
1985	Classique		Short film
1985	Détective	Wise young girl	
1985	L'Amour ou presque	Melie	
1986	Mauvais Sang	Lise	English: Bad Blood; Nominated—César Award for Most Promising Actress
1987	Beatrice	Beatrice de Cortemart	French: La Passion Béatrice; Nominated—César Award for Most Promising Actress
1987	King Lear	Virginia	Uncredited
1988	L'autre nuit	Marie	
1989	The Dark Night	Virgin Mary	Spanish: La noche oscura
1989	Trouble		Short film
1990	Europa Europa	Leni	
1991	Les dents de ma mère	Julie	Short film
1991	Voyager	Sabeth	Nominated—European Film Award for Best Actress
1992	Warszawa. Année 5703	Fryda	English: Warsaw - Year 5703
1993	The Three Musketeers	Constance	
1993	Younger and Younger	Melodie	
1993	Killing Zoe	Zoe	
1993	Three Colours: Blue	Dominique	Cameo
1994	Three Colours: White	Dominique	
1994	Three Colours: Red	Dominique	Cameo
1995	Blah Blah Blah		Short film Also writer, director, and producer
1995	Before Sunrise	Céline	Also uncredited writer Nominated—MTV Movie Award for Best Kiss
1996	Tykho Moon	Lena	
1997	Les mille merveilles de l'univers	Eva Purpur	English: The Thousand Wonders of the Universe
1997	An American Werewolf in Paris	Serafine Pigot	
1997	Alleys and Motorways		Direct-to-video
1998	The Treat	Francesca	
1998	L.A. Without a Map	Julie	
1998	Crime and Punishment	Sonia	Television film
1999	True Love		Television film
1999	The Passion of Ayn Rand	Barbara Branden	Television film
1999	But I'm a Cheerleader	Lipstick Lesbian	
2000	Sand	Lill	
2001	Investigating Sex	Chloe	Also known as Intimate Affairs
2001	MacArthur Park	Wendy	
2001	Waking Life	Céline	
2001	Beginner's Luck	Anya	
2001	ER	Nicole	7 episodes
2002	Villa des roses	Louise Creteur	
2002	Looking for Jimmy	Al	Also writer, director, producer, and editor
2002	CinéMagique	Marguerite	Short film
2003	Notting Hill Anxiety Festival	Charlotte	
2004	J'ai peur, j'ai mal, je meurs	—N/a	Short film Writer, director, and composer
2004	Before Sunset	Céline	Also writer and composer Empire Award for Best Actress; San Francisco Bay Area Film Critics Circle Award for Best Actress; Nominated—National Society of Film Critics Award for Best Actress; Nominated—Online Film Critics Society Award for Best Actress; Nominated—Los Angeles Film Critics Association Award for Best Actress; Nominated—Academy Award for Best Adapted Screenplay; Nominated—National Society of Film Critics Award for Best Screenplay; Nominated—Online Film Critics Society Award for Best Adapted Screenplay; Nominated—Writers Guild of America Award for Best Adapted Screenplay; Nominated—Independent Spirit Award for Best Screenplay
2004	Frankenstein	Caroline Frankenstein	Miniseries
2005	Broken Flowers	Sherry	
2006	The Legend of Lucy Keyes	Jeanne Cooley	
2006	The Hoax	Nina van Pallandt	
2006	Guilty Hearts	Charlotte	
2007	The Air I Breathe	Gina	
2007	2 Days in Paris	Marion	Also writer, director, producer, editor, and composer Prix Jacques Prévert du Scénario for Best Original Screenplay; Nominated—César Award for Best Original Screenplay; Nominated—European Film Awards Audience Award for Best Film; Nominated—Independent Spirit Award for Best First Film; Nominated—Globe de Cristal for Best Film
2009	The Countess	Elizabeth Báthory	Also writer, director, producer, and composer
2011	Skylab	Anna	Also writer and director
2012	2 Days in New York	Marion	Also writer, director, producer, and composer
2013	Before Midnight	Céline	Also writer AARP Award for Best Screenwriter; Broadcast Film Critics Association – Louis XIII Genius Award; Dublin Film Critics' Circle Award for Best Screenplay; Hollywood Film Award for Screenwriter of the Year; Los Angeles Film Critics Association Award for Best Screenplay; National Society of Film Critics Award for Best Screenplay; San Diego Film Critics Society Award for Best Adapted Screenplay; Women Film Critics Circle Award for Best Screenplay; Nominated—Academy Award for Best Adapted Screenplay; Nominated—Broadcast Film Critics Association Award for Best Adapted Screenplay; Nominated—Chicago Film Critics Association Award for Best Adapted Screenplay; Nominated—Denver Film Critics Society Award for Best Adapted Screenplay; Nominated—Detroit Film Critics Society Award for Best Screenplay; Nominated—Independent Spirit Award for Best Screenplay; Nominated—Online Film Critics Society Award for Best Adapted Screenplay; Nominated—St. Louis Film Critics Association Award for Best Adapted Screenplay; Nominated—San Francisco Film Critics Circle Award for Best Adapted Screenplay; Nominated—Satellite Award for Best Adapted Screenplay; Nominated—Washington D.C. Area Film Critics Association Award for Best Adapted Screenplay; Nominated—Writers Guild of America Award for Best Adapted Screenplay; Nominated—Detroit Film Critics Society Award for Best Actress; Nominated—Dublin Film Critics' Circle Award for Best Actress; Nominated—Golden Globe Award for Best Actress in a Motion Picture – Comedy or Musical; Nominated—Guardian Film Award for Best Actor; Nominated—Independent Spirit Award for Best Female Lead; Nominated—National Society of Film Critics Award for Best Actress (Runner-Up); Nominated—Online Film Critics Society Award for Best Actress; Nominated—Toronto Film Critics Association Award for Best Actress
2013	Making a Scene	—N/a	Short film Writer
2015	Avengers: Age of Ultron	Madame B.	
2015	Lolo	Violette	Also writer and director Venice International Film Festival - Laguna Sud Award for Best Film
2016	Wiener-Dog	Dina	
2017	The Bachelors	Carine	
2019	My Zoe	Isabelle	Also director and writer Nominated—2019 Toronto International Film Festival - Platform Prize
2021	On the Verge	Justine	Also creator, executive producer, writer, and director
2023	The Lesson	Hélène Sinclair	
2024	Meet the Barbarians	Joëlle	Also writer and director
2025	Hostage	Vivienne Toussaint	Miniseries
TBA	The Entertainment System Is Down †	TBA	Post-production
TBA	Stages †	TBA	Filming

== Awards and nominations ==
Year	Award	Category	Nominated work	Result
1987	César Award	Most Promising Actress	Mauvais sang	Nominated
1988	César Award	Most Promising Actress	La Passion Béatrice	Nominated
1991	European Film Award	Best Actress	The Voyager	Nominated
1995	MTV Movie Award	Best Kiss	Before Sunrise	Nominated
2004	San Francisco Film Critics Circle Award	Best Actress	Before Sunset	Won
2005	Academy Award	Best Adapted Screenplay	Before Sunset	Nominated
2005	Writers Guild of America Award	Best Adapted Screenplay	Before Sunset	Nominated
2005	Empire Award	Best Actress	Before Sunset	Won
2005	Independent Spirit Award	Best Screenplay	Before Sunset	Nominated
2005	Online Film Critics Society Award	Best Actress	Before Sunset	Nominated
2005	Online Film Critics Society Award	Best Adapted Screenplay	Before Sunset	Nominated
2007	Mons International Festival of Love Films Award	Coup de Coeur	2 Days in Paris	Won
2008	César Award	Best Original Screenplay	2 Days in Paris	Nominated
2014	Golden Globe	Best Actress - Motion Picture Comedy or Musical	Before Midnight	Nominated
2014	Academy Award	Best Adapted Screenplay	Before Midnight	Nominated
