= Julie Delpy (album) =

Studio album by Julie Delpy
- Released: August 5, 2003
- Recorded: Los Angeles, California
- Genre: Pop-folk, folk rock, slowcore
- Length: 45:58
- Label: PIAS France
- Producer: Philippe Eidel

Professional ratings
Review scores
Source	Rating
Allmusic	2/5 stars

Julie Delpy is the debut album by actress/musician Julie Delpy. Delpy wrote and produced all 12 songs on the album.

"A Waltz for a Night", "An Ocean Apart" and "Je t'aime tant" were featured in the film Before Sunset, which starred Delpy and Ethan Hawke.

== Track listing ==
All music and lyrics composed by Julie Delpy; except where indicated

1. "My Dear Friend" - 3:15
2. "Mr Unhappy" - 3:22
3. "Lame Love" (music by Marouan Jamai and Mike Meeker) - 4:09
4. "Ready to Go" - 4:30
5. "Je t'aime tant" - 3:51
6. "Something a Bit Vague" - 3:18
7. "Black & Gray" - 4:45
8. "A Waltz for a Night" - 3:30
9. "She Don't Care" - 4:20
10. "And Together" - 3:41
11. "An Ocean Apart" - 4:01
12. "Time to Wake Up" - 3:16
