= Mari Morrow =

Actress and model

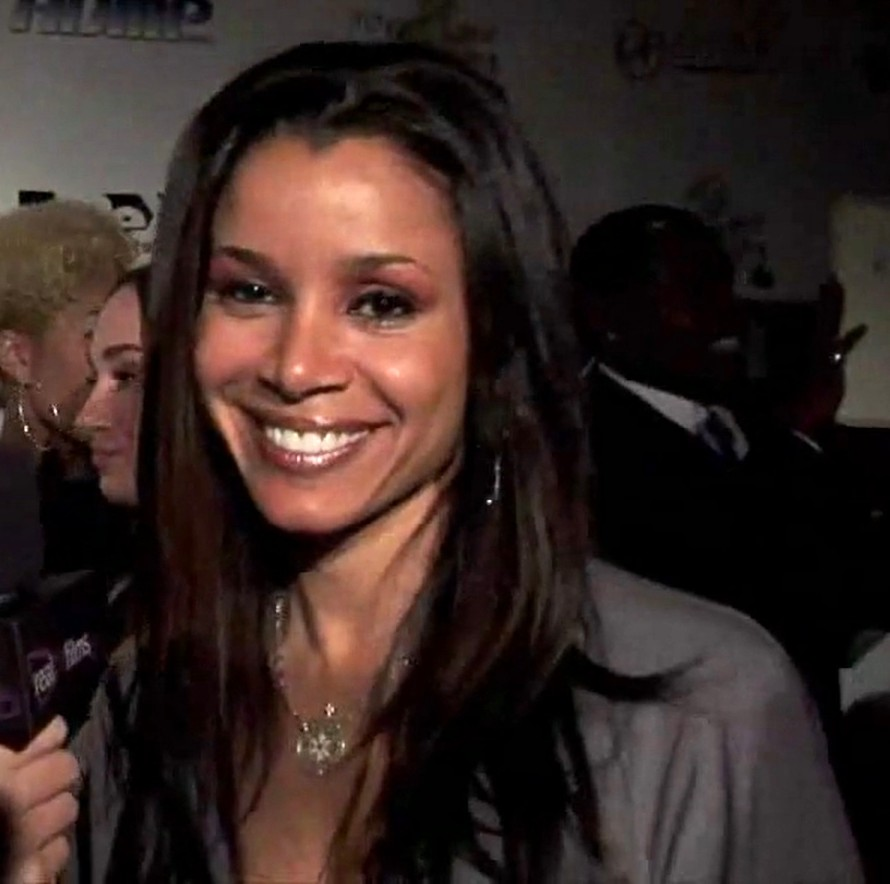
- Morrow in 2009
- Born: July 21, 1968 (age 58); Miami, Florida, United States
- Other names: Mary Morrow; M.M.
- Education: North Miami Senior High School
- Occupation: Actress
- Years active: 1992–present
- Known for: Rachel Gannon – One Life to Live; Oneisha Savoy – Family Matters; Desiree "Des" Littlejohn – The Parkers
- Children: 2

Mari Morrow (born July 21, 1968) is an American film and television actress. Morrow is best known for her roles as Rachel Gannon on the ABC daytime soap opera One Life to Live (1994–96), Oneisha Savoy on the ABC/CBS sitcom Family Matters (1992–97), and Desiree "Des" Littlejohn on the UPN sitcom The Parkers (1999). Morrow also starred in featured films such as Def Jam's How to Be a Player (1997), Uninvited Guest (2000), and Traci Townsend (2006).

== Early life and education ==
Born and raised in Miami, Florida, Morrow is of Barbadian and African-American descent. Morrow began acting as a child in theater productions to help raise funds for low-income college students. Morrow attended North Miami Senior High School, graduating in 1986.

== Career ==
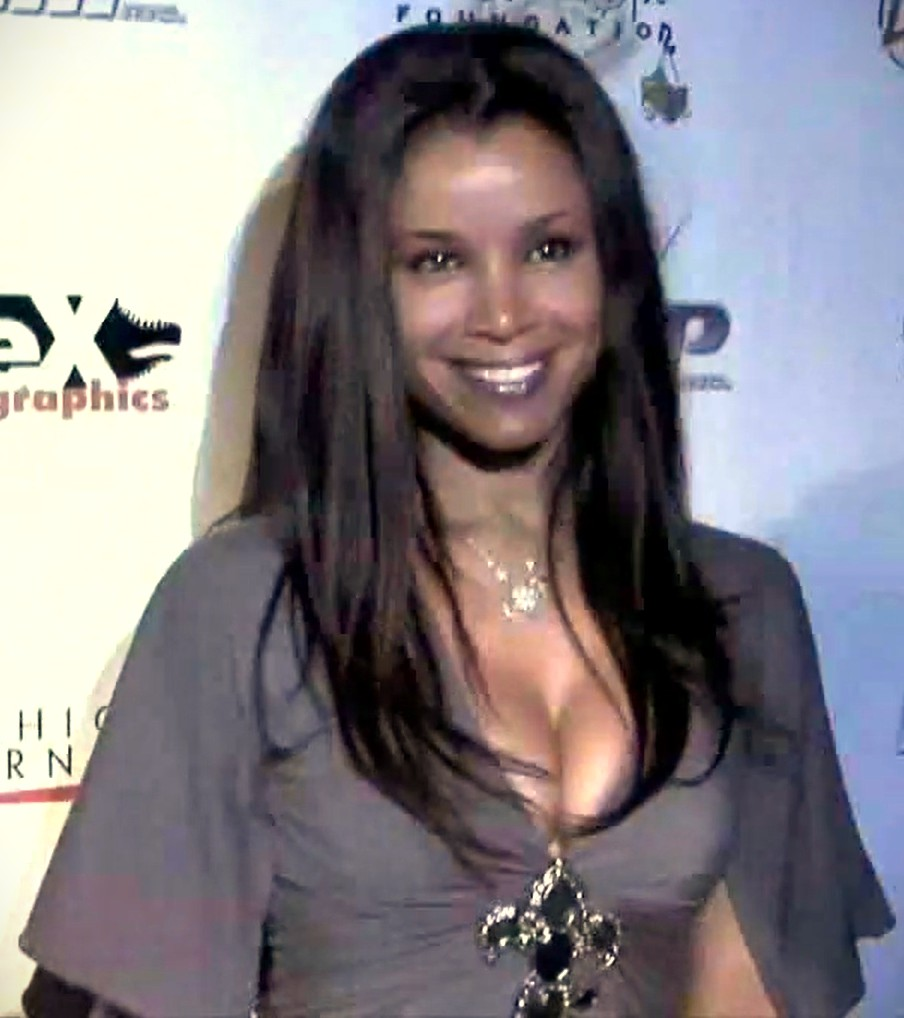
Morrow in 2009

Morrow made her television debut appearance in 1992 as Wendy Mallow on the popular television program, Baywatch. From 1995 to 1996, Morrow portrayed Rachel Gannon on the ABC soap opera One Life to Live. Morrow also had a recurring appearance on the sitcom, Family Matters as Darius McCrary (Eddie)'s girlfriend and then ex-girlfriend, Oneisha, from 1992 to 1997. Other television appearances include, Living Single, Soul Food, Conan, 3rd Rock from the Sun, The Parkers, In the House, The Fresh Prince of Bel-Air, and The Jamie Foxx Show. Morrow has film roles in: Dead Man on Campus, Uninvited Guest, Children of the Corn III: Urban Harvest, Book of Love, Restraining Order, Def Jam's How to Be a Player, Traci Townsend, National Security, and Today You Die.

== Personal life ==
Morrow has two sons, Robert (born August 3, 2000) and Ari (born February 2016).

== Filmography ==
=== Film ===
Year	Title	Role	Notes
1995	Undercover	Victoria	Video
1995	One Last Time	Erica	
1995	Bodily Harm	Diana	
1995	Children of the Corn III: Urban Harvest	Maria Elkman	
1995	Virtuosity	Linda Barnes	
1997	How to Be a Player	Katrina	
1998	Dead Man on Campus	Kristin	
1999	Uninvited Guest	Debbie	
1999	Nikita's Blues	Ms. Jackson	Short
1999	At Face Value	Rookie Cop	Short
2001	Nikita Blues	Miss Beverly Fox	
2001	House Party 4: Down to the Last Minute	Linda	Video
2002	Book of Love: The Definitive Reason Why Men Are Dogs	Lyah	
2003	National Security	Lola	
2003	Malibooty!	Miranda	Video
2003	Straight Out	Delores	
2004	Hair Show	Gina	
2004	Choices 2	Jenni	Video
2005	Flip the Script	Tiffany	
2005	Today You Die	Jada	Video
2005	Uncle P	Lana	
2006	Restraining Order	Jazmine Jenkins	
2007	Traci Townsend	Sylvia	
2009	Afro Ninja	Roxanne	Video
2009	Pastor Brown	Adrian	
2009	Road Trip: Beer Pong	Mandee	Video
2009	Family Affair	Jana	Short
2011	Big Mommas: Like Father, Like Son	Ms. Mercier	
2011	The Lying Truth	Brianna Jordan	
2011	35 and Ticking	Toi	
2012	The Good Life	Holiday	
2012	Reply or Delete an Internet Love Affair	Skye Torres	Short
2014	The Morning After	-	
2016	Diva Diaries	Lisa	
2016	LAPD African Cops	Mrs. Barber	
2019	Child Support	Melody Banks	Short
2019	Hyundai: Hope on Wheels It Takes a Village	Mom	Video

=== Television ===
Year	Title	Role	Notes
1992	Baywatch	(1) Pam (2) Wendy Malloy	(1) Season 2 Episode 19: "The Lost Treasure of Tower 12" (2) Season 3 Episode 11: "Dead of Summer"
1992	Out All Night	Naomi	Season 1 Episode 9: "Smooth Operator"
1992–1997	Family Matters	Oneisha Savoy	(1) Season 3 Episode 15: "Jailhouse Blues" (1992) (2) Season 3 Episode 24: "Dudes" (1992) (3) Season 4 Episode 18: "Higher Anxiety" (1993) (4) Season 8 Episode 18: "Le Jour d'Amour" (1997) (5) Season 9 Episode 5: "Who's Afraid of the Big Black Book?" (1997)
1993	The Fresh Prince of Bel-Air	Cindy	Season 3 Episode 19: "Just Say Yo"
1993	The Jackie Thomas Show	Mimosa Patron	Season 1 Episode 12: "Guys and Balls"
1993	The Sinbad Show	Woman In Restaurant	Season 1 Episode 9: "Shades of Acceptance"
1994	M.A.N.T.I.S	Sena Basuto	Season 1 Episode 4: "Cease Fire"
1994	Red Shoe Diaries	Toni Reed	Season 3 Episode 8: "Emily's Dance"
1995	Soul Train	Herself/Guest Host	Episode: "Michael Bolton/Anointed/AZ feat. Miss Jones"
1995	One Life to Live	Rachel Gannon	Contract role: February 8, 1995 –January 23, 1996
1996	Living Single	Kimberly	Season 3 Episode 20: "Dear John"
1996	Lush Life	Sandy	Season 1 Episode 1: "Lush Beginning"
1996	Sliders	Monique	Season 3 Episode 2: "Double Cross"
1996	Jungle Cubs	Juwanna (voice)	Season 1 Episode 11: "Benny & Clyde/Feather Brains"
1997	Malcolm & Eddie	Dana	Season 1 Episode 16: "Jugglin'"
1997	In the House	Amber	(1) Season 3 Episode 16: "Love Wars" (2) Season 3 Episode 17: "Marion Strikes Back" (3) Season 3 Episode 18: "Return of the Stiletto"
1997	The Jamie Foxx Show	Tia	Season 2 Episode 5: "Is She Is, or Is She Ain't?"
1997	Sparks	Simone Richards	Season 2 Episode 10: "Brotherly Love"
1998	Conan the Adventurer	Surette	Season 1 Episode 12: "Homecoming"
1998	Sister, Sister	Deena	Season 5 Episode 20: "Prom Night"
1999	The Parkers	Desiree "Des" Littlejohn	(1) Season 1 Episode 1: "Grape Nuts" (2) Season 1 Episode 2: "Scammed Straight" (3) Season 1 Episode 3: "Daddy's Girl" (4) Season 1 Episode 4: "Taking Tae-Bo with My Beau" (5) Season 1 Episode 5: "The Boomerang Effect" (6) Season 1 Episode 10: "Betting on Love" (7) Season 1 Episode 11: "It's a Family Affair"
2001	Men, Women & Dogs	Lara	Season 1 Episode 1: "Pilot"
2001	The Tick	Medusa	Season 1 Episode 4: "The License"
2001–2002	Oh, Drama!	Herself/Host	Recurring Host
2002	The Twilight Zone	Clare Woodrell	Season 1 Episode 3: "Shades of Guilt"
2002	The District	Tamra Kenworthy	Season 3 Episode 6: "Old Wounds"
2004	Soul Food	Nyla	(1) Season 5 Episode 9: "Successful Failure" (2) Season 5 Episode 10: "Love Me or Leave Me" (3) Season 5 Episode 11: "Take It to the Limit" (4) Season 5 Episode 13: "Fear Eats the Soul"
2009	Everybody Hates Chris	Lisa Levine	Season 4 Episode 11: "Everybody Hates Mr. Levine"
2012	Touch	Ann-Marie	Season 1 Episode 4: "Kite Strings"
2014	Love That Girl!	Tina	Episode: "Secret Swingers"
2016	Unsung Hollywood	Herself	Episode: "Bill Bellamy"
2021	Sydney to the Max	Jamie	Season 3 Episode 16: "Honey, You Shrunk the Fit"
