= 2 Days in New York =

2012 film by Julie Delpy

- Theatrical release poster
- Directed by: Julie Delpy
- Screenplay by: Julie Delpy; Alexia Landeau
- Story by: Julie Delpy; Alexia Landeau; Alex Nahon
- Based on: Original characters by Julie Delpy
- Produced by: Christophe Mazodier; Scott Franklin; Julie Delpy; Ulf Israel; Hubert Toint; Jean-Jacques Neira
- Starring: Julie Delpy; Chris Rock; Albert Delpy; Alexia Landeau; Alex Nahon; Dylan Baker; Kate Burton; Daniel Brühl
- Cinematography: Lubomir Bakchev
- Edited by: Isabelle Debinick
- Music by: Julie Delpy; Arnaud Boivin; Jean-Michel Zanetti
- Production companies: Polaris Film; Tempête Sous un Crâne; Senator Film; Saga Film; Alvy Productions; In Production; TDY Filmproduktion; BNP Paribas Film Fund; Protozoa Pictures
- Distributed by: Santa Fe/Paradiso (Belgium); Rezo Films (France); Senator Film (Germany)
- Release dates: 23 January 2012 (Sundance); 28 March 2012 (France); 11 April 2012 (Belgium); 5 July 2012 (Germany)
- Running time: 96 minutes
- Countries: Belgium; France; Germany
- Languages: English; French
- Budget: €8.1 million ($8.8 million)
- Box office: $4.1 million

2 Days in New York is a 2012 romantic comedy film co-written and directed by Julie Delpy. It is a sequel to Delpy's 2007 film 2 Days in Paris.

== Synopsis ==
Parisian Marion is living in New York with her son, in order to be closer to Jack, the boy's father (Marion's ex-boyfriend from 2 Days in Paris). She and her new boyfriend Mingus have a cozy relationship until the arrival of Marion's father, sister and sister's boyfriend, on vacation from France. The group's two days together are tested by "unwitting racism and sexual frankness", with no one left unscathed.

== Cast ==
- Chris Rock as Mingus Robinson
- Julie Delpy as Marion
- Albert Delpy as Jeannot, Marion's father
- Alexia Landeau as Rose, Marion's sister
- Alex Nahon as Manu, Rose's boyfriend
- Kate Burton as Bella
- Dylan Baker as Ron
- Daniel Brühl as The Fairy
- Malinda Williams as Elizabeth Robinson, Mingus's sister
- Arthur French as Lee Robinson, Mingus's father
- Vincent Gallo as himself (uncredited)

== Release ==
2 Days in New York premiered at the Sundance Film Festival on 23 January 2012. The film was screened at the Tribeca Film Festival on 26 April 2012 and at the Seattle International Film Festival on 21 May 2012.

2 Days in New York was released theatrically in France on 28 March 2012, in the United Kingdom on 18 May 2012, and in the United States on 10 August 2012.

Following the film's Sundance premiere, distribution rights in Scandinavian and Baltic countries were acquired by Stockholm-based NonStop Entertainment.

== Reception ==
On the review aggregator website Rotten Tomatoes, the film holds an approval rating of 67% based on 108 reviews, with an average rating of 6.3/10. The website's critics consensus reads, "2 Days in New York breezes past its shortcomings thanks to an enjoyably madcap plot and the sweet chemistry between its well-matched stars." Metacritic, which uses a weighted average, assigned the film a score of 61 out of 100, based on 26 critic reviews, indicating "generally favorable reviews".

According to Steve Rose of The Guardian, "Delpy's alter ego Marion" is a "lovable mess of neurotic babble, intellectual uncertainty and unmanageable lies"; the film is a "delightfully eccentric comedy,...big on laughs, low on pretense, exaggerated but emotionally sincere—not least in Delpy's dealing with the death of her mother (in real life as well as in the movie). We've rarely seen comedy this smart since Woody Allen and Seinfeld left New York." Total Film's Neil Smith said the film is a "haphazard meditation on Franco-American relations, which hurls screwball situations, oddball cameos and the odd one-liner liberally at the screen without much caring if any of them stick." Smith concludes "what it all adds up to is an anything goes take on modern relationships with a side order of broad stereotype. Expect to be amused and bemused in equal quantities and you'll be amply entertained."
