= Foreign Student =

1994 film

- Theatrical release poster
- Directed by: Eva Sereny
- Written by: Menno Meyjes
- Produced by: Mark Lombardo
- Starring: Robin Givens; Marco Hofschneider; Rick Johnson; Charlotte Ross; Edward Herrmann; Jack Coleman
- Cinematography: Franco Di Giacomo
- Edited by: Peter Hollywood
- Music by: Jean-Claude Petit
- Production companies: Carthago Films S.a.r.l. FeatherstoneHolland Coordinator and Service Company; Libra Productions; Silvio Berlusconi Communications
- Distributed by: Gramercy Pictures
- Release date: July 29, 1994
- Running time: 90 minutes
- Country: United States
- Language: English

Foreign Student is a 1994 American drama film directed by Eva Sereny and written by Menno Meyjes. The film stars Robin Givens, Marco Hofschneider, Rick Johnson, Charlotte Ross, Edward Herrmann and Jack Coleman. The film was released on July 29, 1994, by Gramercy Pictures.

== Plot ==
When young French student Philippe Leclerc (Marco Hofschneider) gets awarded a fellowship to study abroad in the United States, he is thrilled to experience American culture firsthand. Enrolling at a well-regarded university in Virginia, Philippe initially has a difficult time adjusting to his foreign environment. While Philippe gains the attention of an attractive classmate, Sue Ann (Charlotte Ross), he is more intrigued by a beautiful young black woman, April (Robin Givens).

== Cast ==
- Robin Givens as April
- Marco Hofschneider as Philippe Leclerc
- Rick Johnson as Cal Cate
- Charlotte Ross as Elizabeth 'Sue Ann' Baldridge
- Edward Herrmann as Zachary 'Zach' Gilmore
- Jack Coleman as Rex Jennings
- Charles S. Dutton as Howlin' Wolf
- Hinton Battle as Sonny Boy Williamson
- Anthony Herrera as Coach Mallard
- Bob Child as Counselor
- David Long as Mr. Baldridge
- Ruth Williamson as Mrs. Baldridge
- Michael Reilly Burke as Harrison
- Michael Goodwin as Assistant Coach
- Jon Hendricks as April's Father
- Andy Park as Sheriff McLain
- Brendan Medlin as Hans
- Kevin A. Parrott as Buster Dubonnet
- Cliff McMullen as Preacher
- Jane Beard as Doris Jennings
- Sutton Knight as Editor
- John Habberton as William Faulkner
- Jonathan Sale as Herbie Clemson
