= Day Out of Days (film) =

- Film poster
- Directed by: Zoe Cassavetes
- Written by: Zoe Cassavetes; Alexia Landeau
- Starring: Alexia Landeau; Christa B. Allen; Melanie Griffith; Eddie Izzard
- Cinematography: Denise Milford
- Edited by: Michael Mees
- Music by: Scratch Massive
- Release date: June 14, 2015 (Los Angeles Film Festival)
- Running time: 80 minutes
- Country: United States
- Language: English

Day Out of Days is a 2015 American drama film directed by Zoe Cassavetes and co-written by Cassavetes and Alexia Landeau, who also star in it with Bellamy Young, Eddie Izzard and Alessandro Nivola. It premiered at the 2015 Los Angeles Film Festival to mixed reviews.

== Plot ==
Mia Roarke, an actress, is on a personal and professional high after appearing in a successful period piece Wild Sunset and getting engaged to her co-star, Liam.

10 years later, Mia is divorced from Liam and is struggling to book roles. Her agent gets her an audition with director Dag, who auditions her in a hotel room where he encourages her to take coke and forces her into the bathroom to take a shower. Leaving the hotel she runs into Liam who drives her home. She congratulates him on his engagement to a model, Elle, though in return he tells her that their engagement is by no means assured.

Mia's neighbour Charlotte "Charlie" Riley books a pilot and helps to arrange an audition for Mia who learns that the role is to play Charlie's character's mother.

Her friend, Jen, sets her up with a recovering alcoholic who cleans pools; he ends up insulting her, telling her she's not as attractive as she once was.

Mia's auditions for Charlie's pilot goes well and she begins to think that she has the role. After a day of being gifted free clothing and accessories, under the assumption that she has the role, her agent calls with the news that she didn't get that part.

On reshoots for a zombie thriller movie, Mia fights with her director, Tark, on how to shoot a car crash scene. When she tells him she doesn't understand the point of yelling during a scene, he humiliates her by insulting her career and her love life. A dejected Mia gives in and does the scene his way.

Mia goes to meet her agent, who hints that after 20 years of working together their relationship might be coming to a close. She has dinner with her mother formerly her manager, who still keeps pictures of Mia and Liam around her apartment.

After a day of drinking, Mia calls Liam and they meet at a bar. Miss mistakes his warmth and tries to kiss him, and the encounter is filmed and put on the Internet. Mia's agent tells her that the notoriety is good for her, but Mia is humiliated and decides to make a change. She contemplates selling her house and decides to cut off her mother.

Just as she is in the middle of calling it quits, her agent contacts her and tells her that her horror movie with Tark is testing well and the studio wants to sign her and all the other actors for sequels.

Mia is offered directorial approval on the sequels to the zombie movies and has dinner with Tark and his agent, who treat her with great respect.

She goes to a pawn shop to retrieve some jewelry she pawned when she was short on cash. She decides not to retrieve her engagement ring from Liam. Exiting the pawn shop, she bumps into a man she doesn't recognize; he reminds her that he was her driver on the set of her movie with Tark.

== Cast ==
- Alexia Landeau as Mia Roarke
- Christa B. Allen as Charlie
- Melanie Griffith as Kathy
- Eddie Izzard as Dag
- Brooke Smith as Annabel
- Guy Burnet as E.J.
- Vincent Kartheiser as Tark
- Alessandro Nivola as Liam
- Cheyenne Jackson as Phil
- Bellamy Young as Rebecca

== Production ==
Cassavetes turned to crowdfunding to finance the movie as she was unable to secure funding with Landeau in the lead.

== Critical response ==
The film received mixed reviews after its premiere. The Hollywood Reporter found it to be "a closely observed but familiar portrait of a fallen star." The Playlist's critic gave it a B+ score and called it "a searing indictment of Hollywood's treatment of women."
