= Malinda Williams =

American actress and producer (born 1970)

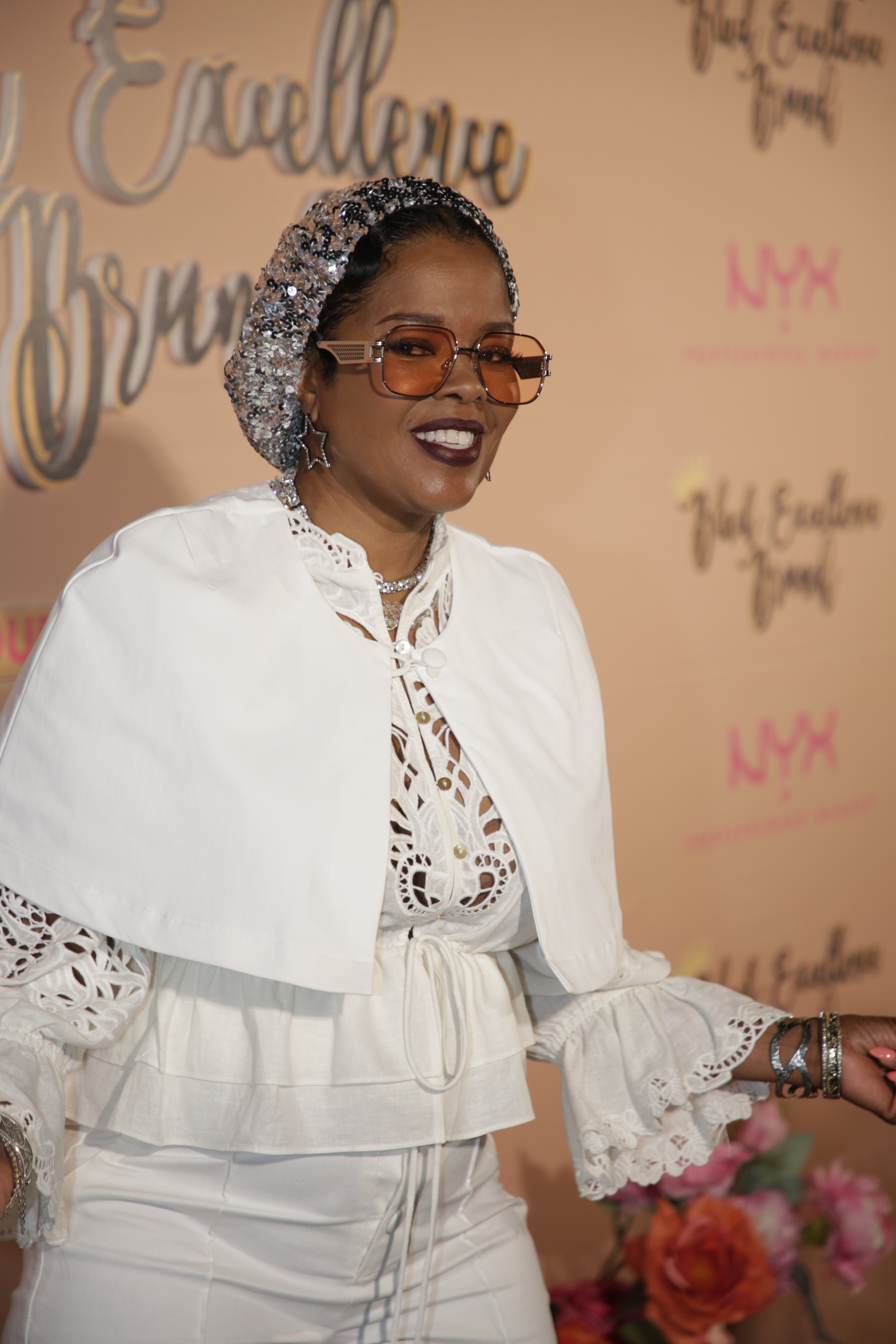
- Williams at the Black Excellence Brunch 2026.
- Born: September 24, 1970 (age 56)
- Other name: Malinda Williams-Phifer
- Occupations: Actress, producer
- Years active: 1987–present
- Spouses: Mekhi Phifer (m. 1999; div. 2003) D-Nice (m. 2008; div. 2010) Tariq Walker (m. 2020)
- Children: 1

Malinda Williams (born September 24, 1970) is an American actress and producer. She began her career on television, before appearing in films A Thin Line Between Love and Hate (1996), High School High (1996), and The Wood (1999).

From 2000 to 2004, Williams starred as Tracy "Bird" Van Adams in the Showtime drama series Soul Food, for which she received three NAACP Image Award for Outstanding Actress in a Drama Series nominations. After starring role in the short-lived NBC drama series Windfall, Williams returned to film playing supporting roles in Idlewild (2006), Daddy's Little Girls (2007), First Sunday (2008), and 2 Days in New York (2012).

== Early life ==
Raised in Plainfield, New Jersey, Williams moved to nearby Westfield at the age of 12 and graduated from Westfield High School.

== Career ==
Williams made her television debut in an episode of The Cosby Show in 1987. She guest starred on Miami Vice, Roc, My So-Called Life, Sister, Sister, Moesha, and NYPD Blue. In film, she made her debut in the 1996 black comedy-romance film A Thin Line Between Love and Hate. Later that year, she co-starred in Sunset Park and High School High. From 1997 to 1998, she had a starring role in The WB sitcom Nick Freno: Licensed Teacher. In 1999, she appeared in the romantic comedy film The Wood and the following year in the thriller Uninvited Guest.

Williams is best known for her role as Bird in the Showtime drama series Soul Food, a continuation of the successful 1997 film of the same name. It also starred Nicole Ari Parker and Vanessa Estelle Williams. For her performance, Williams received three NAACP Image Awards for Outstanding Actress in a Drama Series nominations. The series aired from 2000 to 2004. Soul Food went on to be the longest running drama with a predominantly black cast in the history of American prime-time television. While on Soul Food, Williams appeared Ruff Endz's music video "Someone to Love You" in 2002.

After Soul Food ended, the same year, Williams appeared rapper Young Buck's music video "Shorty Wanna Ride" playing the rapper's love interest.

She later guest-starred on Law & Order: Special Victims Unit, and was a regular cast member on the short-lived NBC drama series Windfall in 2006.

In 2006, Williams appeared in the musical film Idlewild. The following year, she co-starred in the Tyler Perry's romantic comedy-drama Daddy's Little Girls. In 2008, she appeared in First Sunday opposite Ice Cube. She then starred in several independent films. In 2012, Williams co-starred as Chris Rock's sister in the romantic comedy film 2 Days in New York. Between 2013 and 2015, she played the leading role in the Up network's television film Marry Me for Christmas, and its two sequels Marry Us for Christmas and A Baby for Christmas. In 2013, she began hosting the Aspire network's television talk show Exhale. She also starred in two films for TV One: Girlfriends' Getaway and its sequel Girlfriends' Getaway 2 in 2014 and 2015, alongside Garcelle Beauvais, Terri J. Vaughn and Essence Atkins. In 2015, Williams also had a supporting role in David O. Russell's comedy film Accidental Love.

== Personal life ==
Williams was married to actor Mekhi Phifer from 1999 to 2003; they have a son named Omikaye.

In August 2008, she married rapper D-Nice; they separated in August 2009 and filed for divorce in February 2010; and it was finalized on June 14, 2010.

Williams married journalist Tariq Walker in 2020.

== Filmography ==
=== Film ===
Year	Title	Role	Notes
1996	A Thin Line Between Love and Hate	Erica Wright	
1996	Sunset Park	Cheryl	
1996	High School High	Natalie Thompson	
1997	Damn Whitey	Malinda	Short
1999	Uninvited Guest	Tammy	
1999	The Wood	Alicia	
2000	Dancing in September	Rhonda	
2005	Exposure	Woman	Short
2006	Idlewild	Zora	
2007	Daddy's Little Girls	Maya	
2008	First Sunday	Tianna	
2009	A Day in the Life	Boopsy	
2012	2 Days in New York	Elizabeth Robinson	
2012	Back Then	Andrea 'Dre' Devine	
2012	The Undershepherd	Casandra	
2012	A Cross to Bear	Fae	TV movie
2012	Side by Side	Herself	
2013	24 Hour Love	PJ	
2013	Marry Me for Christmas	Marci Jewel	TV movie
2014	Percentage	Cassandra	
2014	Girlfriends' Getaway	Camille	TV movie
2014	Marry Us for Christmas	Marci Jewel	TV movie
2015	Accidental Love	Rakeesha	
2015	Girlfriends Getaway 2	Camille	TV movie
2015	A Baby for Christmas	Marci Jewel	TV movie
2016	Merry Christmas, Baby	Marci Jewel	TV movie
2018	War Paint	Nancy	Short
2018	Chandler Christmas Getaway	Marci Jewel	TV movie
2019	Loved To Death	Monica	
2019	A Second Chance	Erica Styles	

=== Television ===
Year	Title	Role	Notes
1987	The Cosby Show	Althea Logan	Episode: "Calling Doctor Huxtable"
1989	Miami Vice	Lynette	Episode: "Too Much, Too Late"
1990	The Cosby Show	Shana	Episode: "Denise Kendall: Singles Counselor"
1993	Loving	Maya	Regular Cast
1993	Roc	Celina	Episode: "He Ain't Heavy, He's My Father"
1993	Laurel Avenue	Sheila Arnett	TV mini series
1994	South Central	Candi	Episodes: "Dad" & "Gun: Part 2"
1994	My So-Called Life	Yvette	Episode: "The Substitute"
1994	Me and the Boys	Elizabeth	Episode: "Bad Influence"
1994–95	Sister, Sister	Tyra	Episodes: "Get a Job" and "Field Trip"
1995	CBS Schoolbreak Special	Alex Bing	Episode: "What About Your Friends"
1995	Captain Planet and the Planeteers	Michelle (voice)	Episode: "In Zarm's Way"
1995	Under One Roof	Tamika	Episode: "Secrets"
1995	The Client	Zora Ward	Episode: "Them That Has..."
1996	Moesha	Taylor	Recurring cast: season 1, guest: season 2
1996	NYPD Blue	Annette Morris	Episode: "Ted and Carey's Bogus Adventure"
1996	The John Larroquette Show	Shanelle	Episode: "When Yussel Learned to Yodel"
1997	Dangerous Minds	Lashawn	Episode: "The Feminine Mystique"
1997–98	Nick Freno: Licensed Teacher	Tasha Morrison	Main cast: season 2
2000	Movie Stars	Bianca	Episode: "La Vida Loca"
2000–04	Soul Food	Tracy 'Bird' Van Adams	Main cast
2003	Half & Half	Myra	Episode: "The Big Much 'I Do' About Nothing Episode"
2004	The Division	Tanya	Episode: "Play Ball"
2004	Law & Order: Special Victims Unit	Lori-Ann Dufoy	Episode: "Careless"
2004	The District	Rennee	Episodes: "A.K.A" & "The Black Widow Maker"
2006	Windfall	Kimberly George	Regular Cast

=== Music videos ===
- "Many Styles" by Audio Two
- "Someone to Love You" by Ruff Endz
- "Back at you" by Mobb Deep
- "Shorty Wanna Ride" by Young Buck
- "What Could've Been" by Ginuwine
- "Until It's Gone" by Monica
- "Self Destruction" by Boogie Down Productions

== Awards and nominations ==
Year	Awards	Category	Recipient	Outcome
2000	Black Reel Awards	Black Reel Award for Best Actress	"The Wood"	Nominated
2003	NAACP Image Award	NAACP Image Award for Outstanding Actress in a Drama Series	"Soul Food"	Nominated
2004	NAACP Image Award	NAACP Image Award for Outstanding Actress in a Drama Series	"Soul Food"	Nominated
2005	NAACP Image Award	NAACP Image Award for Outstanding Actress in a Drama Series	"Soul Food"	Nominated
2013	American Black Film Festival	American Black Film Festival Award for Best Performance	"The Undershepherd"	Won
