= Uninvited Guest =

- Directed by: Timothy Wayne Folsome
- Written by: Timothy Wayne Folsome
- Produced by: Kevin D. Hightower; Larry Spud Raymond; Harold Folsome; William Hightower; Keith Hightower
- Starring: Mekhi Phifer; Mari Morrow; Malinda Williams
- Distributed by: Trimark Pictures; Astro Distribution (Germany)
- Release date: June 1999
- Running time: 116 minutes
- Language: English
- Box office: $170,832

Uninvited Guest is a 1999 thriller film. Directed by Timothy Wayne Folsome, it stars Mekhi Phifer, Mari Morrow and Malinda Williams.

== Plot ==
The film begins with children playing outside when a stranger walks by and robs a store. After Mecca pulls out a shotgun, the stranger shoots and kills her.

The scene then opens when Debbie and Howard are celebrating their wedding anniversary. A special night together turns into a nightmare when Howard, Mo and Tre hear a knock on their door. Tre opens the door and lets a man named Silk into the house to use the phone after his car broke down. Besides the car trouble that brought him to the door, he also brings along a string of frightening murders.

Debbie then finds out that her husband and best friend Tammy set a hit on her, just to earn a lot of money. However, all of that backfires on everyone, especially Debbie. Howard accidentally shoots Debbie, much to everyone's surprise. Silk then crawls towards her, but Howard warns him to get away from her. Silk responds with a simple reply. Howard then shoots him in the head, ending the stranger's (Silk's) life.

As the police begin to unravel what has taken place, Tammy and Howard are interrogated by the lead detective. After Debbie and Silk's bodies are collected by the coroner, a forensics investigator finds a tape recorder still recording under the bed that Debbie had placed. The lead detective stands up and tells him to play back the recording.

== Cast ==
- Mekhi Phifer as Silk (Andrew Anderson)
- Mari Morrow as Debbie
- Malinda Williams as Tammy
- Mel Jackson as Howard
- Wanya Morris as Mo
- William-Christopher Stephens as Tre
- Kim Fields as Mecca

== Production ==
The film was produced in three weeks during fall 1998. Cinematography was shot in Columbus, Reynoldsburg, Grandview Heights and Youngstown, Ohio. The artwork featured in the film was by Robert S. Wright, a central Ohio artist. A soundtrack was released in February 2001.
