= High School High =

1996 film directed by Hart Bochner

- Theatrical release poster
- Directed by: Hart Bochner
- Written by: David Zucker; Robert LoCash; Pat Proft
- Produced by: David Zucker; Robert LoCash; Gil Netter
- Starring: Jon Lovitz; Tia Carrere; Mekhi Phifer; Louise Fletcher
- Cinematography: Vernon Layton
- Edited by: James R. Symons
- Music by: Ira Newborn
- Production companies: TriStar Pictures; Zucker Brothers Productions
- Distributed by: Sony Pictures Releasing
- Release date: October 25, 1996
- Running time: 86 minutes
- Country: United States
- Language: English
- Box office: $21,302,121(US)

High School High is a 1996 American comedy film about an inner city high school in the Los Angeles, California area, starring Jon Lovitz, Tia Carrere, Mekhi Phifer, Louise Fletcher, Malinda Williams, and Brian Hooks. It is a spoof of films concerning idealistic teachers (such as To Sir, with Love) being confronted with a class of cynical teenagers, disengaged by conventional schooling, and loosely parodies Blackboard Jungle, High School Confidential, The Principal, Dangerous Minds, Lean on Me, The Substitute, Stand and Deliver, and Grease.

The film is dedicated to the memories of casting director Elisabeth Leustig and actor Lexie Bigham, both of whom were killed in automobile crashes shortly after filming was completed.

== Plot ==
Richard Clark is an unsatisfied prep school teacher at the fictional Wellington Academy, who accepts a job at inner city Marion Barry High School, much to the chagrin of his boss and father, Wellington headmaster Thaddeus Clark. Richard arrives to find the school in a state of disarray and disorder, while meeting several students and faculty members including: the blunted, soured, and uninspiring principal, Evelyn Doyle, her cheerful assistant Victoria Chappell and student Griff McReynolds.

Despite initial opposition to his teaching style and harassment from the school gang leader Paco, Richard begins connecting with his students and teaches them effectively, while developing a romantic relationship with Victoria. Barry High eventually is transformed into a fine educational establishment. Frustrated, Paco and his gang tamper with the school's final exam scores, causing everyone to fail. Griff, who grew to see Richard as a mentor, loses faith in him, as does the rest of the school and Richard is fired. Griff subsequently joins Paco's gang to make extra money.

Victoria learns through word of mouth that Paco was behind the failing test scores and rushes to inform Richard, who decides to confront Paco and rescue Griff with the help of several of his students, including Anferny Jefferson, Natalie Thompson and Julie Rubels. By deceiving Mr. DeMarco, a local gangster, Richard and Victoria reach Paco and the local crime boss, "Mr. A", whom they find has been Principal Doyle the entire time. Griff is told the truth about the test scores and after a brief fight, Paco, Doyle and DeMarco are arrested.

Richard (now principal of Barry High) presides over the graduation ceremony and proudly names Griff as the class valedictorian. The six main students of the film graduate (but only those six). Richard makes good on his promise to send Griff to college and is in a relationship with Victoria.

== Cast ==
- Jon Lovitz as Richard Clark, a naive, mild-mannered white teacher whose main goal is to help the underachieving students at Marion Barry High School succeed.
  - Lovitz also plays Clark's mother.
- Tia Carrere as Victoria Chappell, the principal's assistant who sympathizes with Richard, as well as with the troubled students at Marion Barry High.
- Louise Fletcher as Principal Evelyn Doyle, a mean-spirited, uncaring principal who doesn't believe in the academic abilities of a single student at her school and has given up on them. She also takes an immediate dislike to Richard and believes that he will fail.
- Mekhi Phifer as Griff McReynolds, one of Clark's students. A former gang member who is one of the few students at Marion Barry High who aspires to graduate high school and attend college.
- Malinda Williams as Natalie Thompson, Griff's girlfriend who used to date Paco, Griff's one time gang partner-turned-nemesis.
- Guillermo Díaz as Paco de la Vega al Camino Cordoba Jose Cuervo Sanchez Rodriguez Jr., Griff's former gang partner.
- Brian Hooks as Anferny Jefferson, one of Clark's students. He is a slightly dimwitted gang member who only knows of urban pop culture.
- Natasha Gregson Wagner as Julie Rubels, one of Clark's students who is a teenage mother with many children.
- Marco Rodríguez as Mr. DeMarco, a gangster who is in the midst of a shady "business" deal with Paco and another mysterious gangster known as "Mr. A".
- John Neville as Thaddeus Clark, Richard's father.
- Lexie Bigham as "Two-Bags", a member of Paco's gang. This was Bingham's final film appearance.
- Gil Espinoza as Alonzo, a member of Paco's gang.
- Baoan Coleman as Mou Mou Bartender
- Lu Elrod as Miss Bernie Wells
- Eve Sigall as Miss Foley
- Michael D. Nye as Vice Principal Mr. Arnott
- Nicholas Worth as "Rhino"
- Eric Allan Kramer as "Hulk"
- Jeannie Pepper as Mrs. McReynolds (credited as Joan Ruedelstein)

== Release ==
The film opened at #2 on the weekend of October 25, 1996, behind the film Sleepers. The film remained in the top 5 for the next two weekends.

=== Reception ===
The film received generally negative reviews upon its release. On Rotten Tomatoes, it has a score of 20% based on reviews from 15 critics, with an average rating of 4.4/10. On Metacritic, it has a score of 33 out of 100 based on reviews from 10 critics, indicating "generally unfavorable" reviews. Audiences surveyed by CinemaScore gave the film a grade B+ on scale of A to F.

Roger Ebert gave the film 1 1/2 stars out of 4, and said "the movie makes two mistakes: (1) It isn't very funny, and (2) it makes the crucial error of taking its story seriously and angling for a happy ending."

Andrew Hindes wrote in Variety that "the problem with High School High isn’t that it always goes for the cheap laugh, but that it fails at getting it so often. Like a student who studies hard but just doesn’t have the smarts, this joyless send-up of the Dangerous Minds, Stand and Deliver, idealistic-teacher-in-a-ghetto-school genre plods along earnestly with barely passing grades. B.O. prospects appear below average: Given the lack of youth-oriented fare in the marketplace, target teen audiences may fill seats early in the semester, but attendance is likely to drop off quickly."

Upon its video release in March 1997, Michael Sauter wrote in Entertainment Weekly that "uplifting inner-city high school movies on the order of Dangerous Minds get an overdue but underinspired send-up in this occasionally funny spoof cowritten by David Zucker (The Naked Gun)", adding that "despite a steady stream of such typical Zucker sight gags, this parody’s pace is surprisingly slack. Even the TV tube’s reduced, sitcom-friendly confines aren’t enough to hide the holes of High School High."

== Soundtrack ==
A soundtrack containing hip hop and R&B music was released on August 19, 1996, via Big Beat Records. The album peaked at No. 20 on the Billboard 200 and at No. 4 on the Top R&B/Hip-Hop Albums and was also certified Gold by the Recording Industry Association of America for selling over 500,000 copies in the United States.

== See also ==
- List of hood films
