= 2 Days in Paris =

2007 film by Julie Delpy

- Theatrical release poster
- Directed by: Julie Delpy
- Written by: Julie Delpy
- Produced by: Christophe Mazodier; Julie Delpy; Thierry Potok
- Starring: Julie Delpy; Adam Goldberg; Daniel Brühl; Marie Pillet; Albert Delpy; Alexia Landeau; Adán Jodorowsky; Alex Nahon
- Cinematography: Lubomir Bakchev
- Edited by: Julie Delpy
- Music by: Julie Delpy
- Production companies: Polaris Film Production & Finance; Tempête sous un Crâne Productions; 3L Filmproduktion
- Distributed by: Rézo Films (France); 3L Filmverleih (Germany)
- Release dates: 10 February 2007 (Berlin); 17 May 2007 (Germany); 11 July 2007 (France)
- Running time: 101 minutes
- Countries: France; Germany
- Languages: English; French
- Budget: €1.5 million ($1.8 million)
- Box office: $19.7 million

2 Days in Paris is a 2007 romantic comedy-drama film written, co-produced, edited, scored and directed by Julie Delpy, and stars Delpy, Adam Goldberg and Daniel Brühl. It was followed by the 2012 sequel 2 Days in New York.

== Premise ==
Marion is a French-born photographer living in New York City with her neurotic, hypochondriac, chain-smoking, heavily tattooed American interior designer boyfriend Jack. After a markedly unromantic trip to Venice, which was planned to re-ignite the passion in their relationship, they take a night train to Paris to pick up Marion's cat from her parents and decide to stay for two days. Jack is startled to learn Marion has remained in contact with numerous ex-lovers and becomes increasingly uncomfortable due to the language barrier and a multitude of her old flames she keeps meeting. Meanwhile, Marion wrestles with her own insecurities about love, relationships, and her impulsive nature.

== Cast ==
- Adam Goldberg as Jack
- Julie Delpy as Marion
- Daniel Brühl as Lukas
- Marie Pillet as Anna, Marion's mother
- Albert Delpy as Jeannot, Marion's father
- Alexia Landeau as Rose, Marion's sister
- Adán Jodorowsky as Mathieu
- Alex Nahon as Manu
- Vanessa Seward as Vanessa
- Thibault De Lussy as Gaël

== Production ==
The film was shot on location in Paris. Sites included Gare Du Nord train station, Pasteur station in the Paris Metro and the grave of Jim Morrison in Père Lachaise Cemetery. Marie Pillet and Albert Delpy, who portray Marion's parents, are Julie Delpy's real-life parents. It was produced by Christophe Mazodier with his company Polaris Film Production & Finance.

== Release ==
The film had its world premiere in the Panorama section of the 57th Berlin International Film Festival on 10 February 2007. It was released theatrically in Germany on 17 May 2007 and was shown at the Seattle International Film Festival, the Tremblant Film Festival in Canada, the Los Angeles Film Festival, and Paris Cinéma before its theatrical release in France on 11 July and the United States on 10 August.

== Reception ==
=== Critical response ===
Reviews were mostly positive. On the review aggregator website Rotten Tomatoes, 88% of 120 critics' reviews are positive, with an average rating of 6.9/10. The website's consensus reads: "Delpy proves not only to be an adept actress, but makes her mark as a writer and director in this thought-provoking comedy that breaks the romantic comedy mold." Metacritic, which uses a weighted average, assigned the film a score of 67 out of 100, based on 30 critics, indicating "generally favorable" reviews.

In the Chicago Sun-Times, Roger Ebert called Julie Delpy "an original, a woman who refuses to be defined or limited" and said she "has made a smart film with an edge to it... What she has done here is avoid all temptation to recycle the usual lovers-in-Paris possibilities, and has created two original, quirky characters so obsessed with their differences that Paris is almost a distraction."

Stephen Holden of The New York Times said the film "is an inside-out version of the much-admired Richard Linklater films Before Sunrise and Before Sunset, in which Ms. Delpy and Ethan Hawke portray a French-American pair who meet, part and reunite years later. Where Mr. Linklater's movies were weepies for the kind of educated, upscale young cosmopolites who have a soft spot for romances like Casablanca, Ms. Delpy's examination of modern love among the almost young and still restless is bracingly hard-headed."

In her review for the Los Angeles Times, Carina Chocano said, "At first blush, 2 Days in Paris looks like it's going to be the story of a culture-clashing couple. But slowly and rather slyly, Delpy zeros in on something much more subtle and complex. What interests her are not the superficial differences between people from different countries... but the way in which the distances between people, genders and cultures (the very distances we rely on to grant us the perspective needed to see how completely insane other people, genders, cultures really are) seem to shift constantly according to circumstances."

=== Accolades ===
Delpy was nominated for the César Award for Best Original Screenplay, the European Film Awards Audience Award for Best Film, and the Independent Spirit Award for Best First Film. The film won the Coup de Cœur Award from the Mons International Festival of Love Films. It also won the Prix Jacques Prévert du Scénario for Best Original Screenplay in 2008.

== Sequel ==
In February 2010, it was announced a sequel titled 2 Days in New York was in production. Actress/director Delpy re-teamed with Polaris Film to produce the "atypical sequel." She directed the sequel in Manhattan in October and reprised her role as Marion, a Frenchwoman who now finds herself in New York with her child and a new guy, having broken up with her 2 Days in Paris lover (and the father of her child) who was played by Goldberg.

"It's about the difficulty of relationships but also about the main character's evolution in general. It's a very modern story about the complexities of being a woman and not being completely consumed by your partner," Delpy explained. Comedian Chris Rock confirmed on The Howard Stern Show on 8 November 2010 that he was set to play the "new guy" in the film. Other members of the Paris cast, including Delpy's real father Albert, returned to their same roles for the film.
