= Mekhi Phifer =

American actor (born 1974)

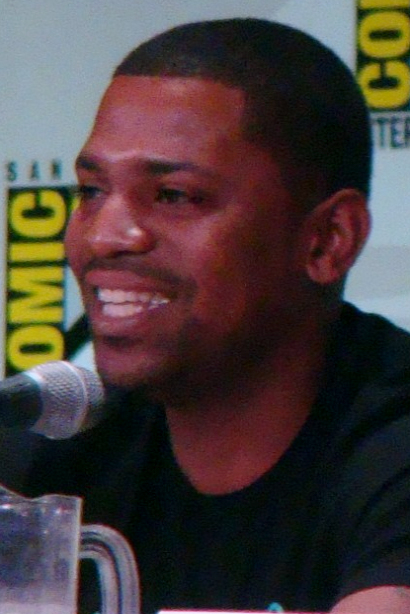
- Phifer at the 2011 San Diego Comic-Con
- Born: December 29, 1974 (age 51); New York City, U.S.
- Occupation: Actor
- Years active: 1994–present
- Spouses: Malinda Williams (m. 1999; div. 2003) Reshelet Barnes Phifer (m. 2013)
- Children: 2

Mekhi Phifer (/mɛˌkaɪ ˈfaɪfər/ meh-KY FY-fər; born December 29, 1974) is an American actor. Beginning his career in the mid-1990s, Phifer was known for a few notable roles in films including Clockers, Soul Food, High School High and I Still Know What You Did Last Summer. He also appeared in the 1998 music video for "The Boy Is Mine" by Brandy and Monica. In 2002, he had a co-starring role opposite rapper Eminem in the feature film 8 Mile. His most notable television role is that of Dr. Greg Pratt, whom he portrayed from 2002 to 2008 on NBC's long-running medical drama ER. From July to October 2011, he played the role of CIA officer Rex Matheson in the British–American science fiction television show, Torchwood: Miracle Day. In 2013, he became a recurring cast member during season three on the Showtime drama House of Lies. Phifer starred in the action feature film Long Gone Heroes, with Frank Grillo and Andy Garcia, in 2024.

== Early life ==
Phifer was born on December 29, 1974, in Harlem, New York City. He grew up in a single-parent household with his mother, Rhoda Phifer, an elementary school teacher. He never met his father.

== Career ==
In 1994, while attending Columbia University to study electrical engineering, 19-year-old Phifer attended an open-casting call for director Spike Lee's Clockers, beating over a thousand others to get the lead role as a narcotics dealer embroiled in a murder cover-up. He followed that role with another in the comedy spoof feature High School High (which also starred his former wife Malinda Williams) and continued by co-starring in the horror film I Still Know What You Did Last Summer, starring Jennifer Love Hewitt and Freddie Prinze Jr. He also starred in the film Paid in Full in 2002.

He portrayed Dr. Gregory Pratt on the NBC medical drama ER, a role which he introduced in April 2002. Phifer left the show in September 2008, in the first episode of Season 15. His character died during the conclusion of the season 14 finale cliffhanger involving an ambulance explosion that was rigged to kill an injured FBI informant (Steve Buscemi). During his six years in the show, he was nominated twice for an NAACP Image Award.

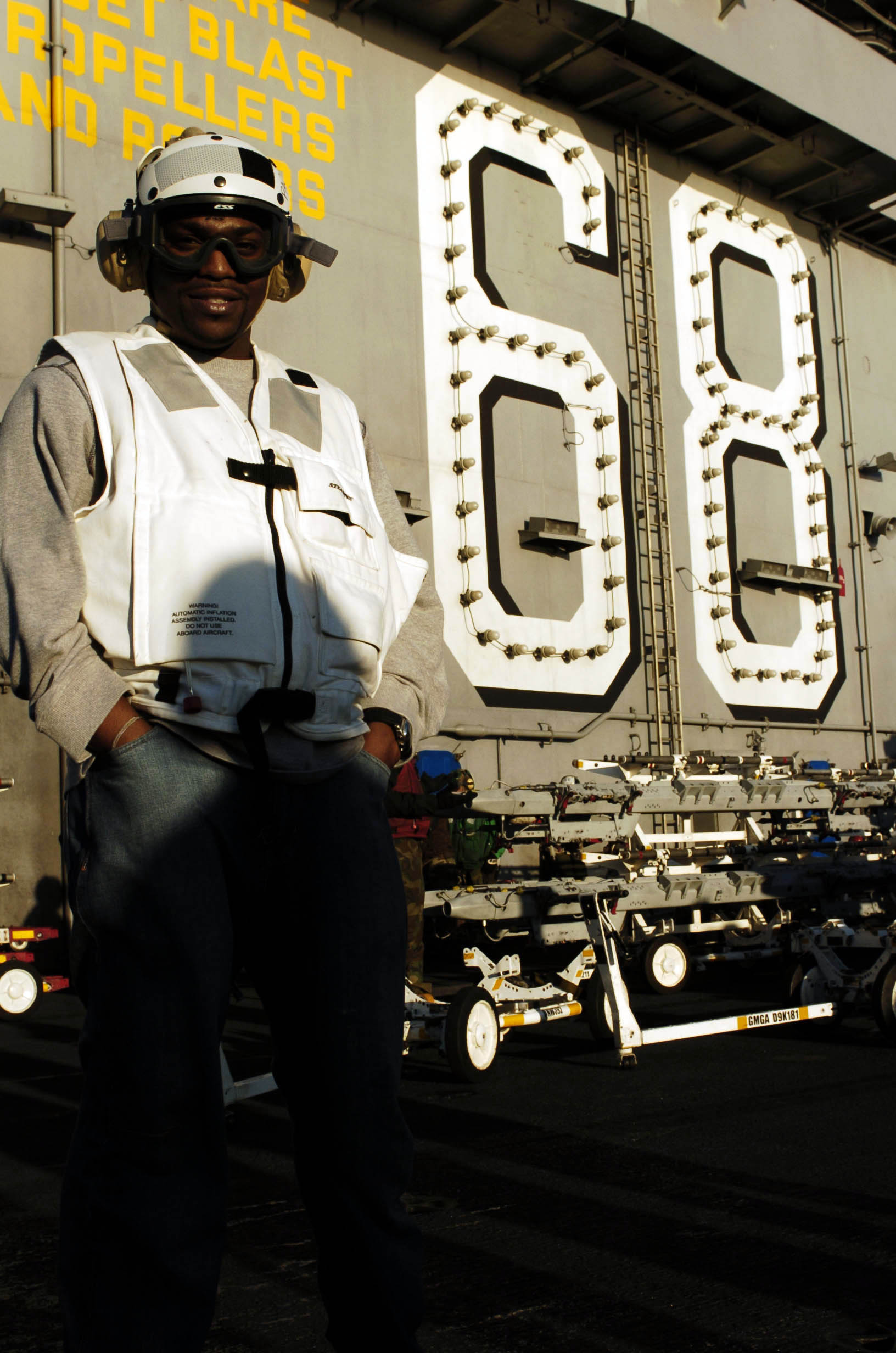
Phifer on the flight deck of USS Nimitz in 2004

Phifer's television credits include the film The Tuskegee Airmen (1995), HBO's Subway Stories: Tales from the Underground (1997). He received additional notice for his performance opposite singer Beyoncé Knowles (from Destiny's Child) on MTV's alternative take on the Carmen legend with the film Carmen: A Hip Hopera (2001).

Phifer had a recurring guest role in the fifth and sixth seasons of Homicide: Life on the Street, portraying "Junior Bunk", the troubled nephew of Baltimore drug lord Luther Mahoney, and also guest-starred in New York Undercover. He earned an NAACP Image Award nomination for the TV film, A Lesson Before Dying, opposite Don Cheadle. In 2009, Phifer began a guest-starring arc on the Fox drama Lie to Me.

Among Phifer's other big-screen credits are Soul Food, The Biography of Spud Webb, Hell's Kitchen, NYC, Tears of a Clown, O (as the titular character Odin a.k.a. O), and the thriller Uninvited Guest (as Silk). He appeared in Impostor as well as Paid in Full, an urban classic, that has given him notorious recognition as he portrayed Mitch and director Curtis Hanson's 8 Mile, opposite Eminem. He is mentioned in the lyrics of the Grammy and Academy Award winning song "Lose Yourself" by Eminem.

In June 2011, Phifer starred alongside John Barrowman and Eve Myles as CIA agent Rex Matheson in Torchwood: Miracle Day, the fourth series of the BBC/Starz Entertainment TV show Torchwood. In December of that year, he also starred on Broadway in Lydia Diamond's Stick Fly.

Phifer starred as Agent Collins in the fourth season of White Collar.

He made a guest appearance on the sitcom series Husbands in its second season.

In fall 2016, he joined the TV show Frequency as a series regular.

== Personal life ==
Phifer has a son with his former wife, actress Malinda Williams. His second son was born to Oni Souratha in Los Angeles in 2007. On March 30, 2013, Phifer married his longtime girlfriend Reshelet Barnes in Beverly Hills, California.

== Political views ==
In October 2023, at the start of the Gaza war, Mekhi Phifer, along with other 700 notable Hollywood figures, signed an open letter, written by Creative Community for Peace (CCFP), in support of Israel.

== Other activities ==
Phifer was the winner of the Celebrity Poker Showdown's fourth tournament, defeating Matthew Perry, Dennis Rodman, Kevin Nealon and Neil Patrick Harris in the Championship game. Phifer plays on the World Poker Tour in the Hollywood Home games for the Love Our Children USA charity. Phifer is chairman of the board of trustees of The Vine Group USA. a non-profit organization established in 2000 to provide educational resources to universities in Africa. He has signed up with Full Tilt Poker. He has his own well on the poker forum 2+2.

Phifer is an owner of a number of Athlete's Foot athletic shoe-store franchises in California.

In January 2011, Phifer launched Third Reel Films. The stated mission of the company is to provide an environment for filmmakers to showcase their work to entertainment representatives, acquisition executives, and other key-industry professionals.

== Filmography ==
=== Film ===
Year	Title	Role	Notes
1995	The Tuskegee Airmen	Lewis Johns	Television film
1995	Clockers	Ronald 'Strike' Dunham	
1996	Girl 6	Himself	
1996	High School High	Griff McReynolds	
1996	Sureshot	Kevin	
1997	SUBWAYStories: Tales from the Underground	Man in Hallway	Television film
1997	Soul Food	Lem Van Adams	
1997	Hav Plenty	Harold	
1998	Hell's Kitchen	Johnny	
1998	I Still Know What You Did Last Summer	Tyrell Martin	
1999	A Lesson Before Dying	Jefferson	Television film
1999	Uninvited Guest	Silk	
2000	Shaft	Trey Howard	
2001	Carmen: A Hip Hopera	Derek Hill	Television film
2001	O	Odin "O" James	
2001	Impostor	Cale	
2001	Brian's Song	Gale Sayers	Television film
2001	Head Games	John Ambrose, Jr. 'John John'	
2002	The Other Brother	Martin	
2002	Paid in Full	Mitch	
2002	8 Mile	David "Future" Porter	
2003	Honey	Chaz	
2004	Dawn of the Dead	Andre	
2005	Slow Burn	Isaac Duperde	
2006	Puff, Puff, Pass	Big Daddy	
2007	This Christmas	Gerald	
2008	Nora's Hair Salon 2: A Cut Above	Dr. Terry	
2009	A Day in the Life	King Khi	
2010	Tenement	Tyrese Harris	
2011	Flypaper	Darrien	
2011	Last Man Standing	Jeremy Davis	Television film
2013	The Suspect	The Suspect	
2013	The Love Section	James Johnson	
2014	Divergent	Max	
2014	A Day Late and a Dollar Short	Lewis	Television film
2015	The Divergent Series: Insurgent	Max	
2016	Pandemic	Gunner	
2016	The Divergent Series: Allegiant	Max	
2017	Chocolate City: Vegas Strip	Best Valentine	
2018	A Talent for Trouble	Mekhi Phifer	
2018	Canal Street	Prosecutor A.J Canton	
2019	Obsession	Sonny	
2024	Lights Out	Max Bomer	
2024	The Supremes At Earl's All-You-Can-Eat	James Henry	
2024	Long Gone Heroes	Moreao	
2024	The Silent Hour	Mason Lynch	
TBA	New Jersey's Finest	Steve Sugar	Pre-production
TBA	10-13	Dave Harris	Pre-production

=== Television ===
Year	Title	Role	Notes
1995	Models Inc.	Model #2	Episode: "By Crook or by Hook"
1995–96	New York Undercover	Dion Broat / Sekou	2 episodes
1996–98	Homicide: Life on the Street	Nathaniel Lee "Junior Bunk" Mahoney	3 episodes
2002–08	ER	Dr. Gregory Pratt	Recurring cast: season 8, main cast: season 9–14, guest: season 15
2004	Punk'd	Himself	Episode: "Episode #3.6"
2005	Curb Your Enthusiasm	Omar Jones	Recurring cast: season 5
2008	The Black Poker Stars Invitational	Himself	TV series
2009–11	Lie to Me	Ben Reynolds	Recurring cast: season 1, main cast: season 2
2011	Torchwood	Agent Rex Matheson	Main cast: season 4
2012	Psych	Drake	Episode: "Let's Doo-Wop It Again"
2012	White Collar	Kyle Collins	Episode: "Wanted" & "Most Wanted"
2012	Husbands	Mark	Episode: "The Straightening"
2014	House of Lies	Andrew "Dre" Collins	Recurring cast: season 3
2015	Key & Peele	Cousin	Episode: "Hollywood Sequel Doctor"
2016	Roots	Jerusalem	Episode: "Part 4"
2016	Secret City	US Ambassador to Australia Moreton	Main cast: season 1
2016–17	Frequency	Satch Reyna	Main cast
2017	Match Game	Himself/Celebrity Panelist	TV series
2018	Chicago P.D.	Joe Baker	Episode: "Captive"
2018	The Bobby Brown Story	Tommy Brown	2 episodes
2019–23	Truth Be Told	Markus Killebrew	Main cast
2020–22	Love, Victor	Harold Brooks	Recurring cast
2025	Law & Order	Lyman Ross	Episode: "Greater Good"
2025	High Potential	Arthur Ellis	Season 2, Recurring

=== Music videos ===
- 1994: "Flava in Ya Ear" by Craig Mack
- 1996: "Wu Wear" by RZA Feat. Method Man & Cappadonna
- 1996: "So Many Ways" by The Braxtons
- 1996: "Nobody" by Keith Sweat featuring Athena Cage
- 1996: "Don't Let Go (Love)" by En Vogue
- 1998: "The Boy Is Mine" by Brandy and Monica
- 1999: "BOOM" by Royce da 5'9"
- 2002: "Lose Yourself" by Eminem
- 2003: "Many Men (Wish Death)" by 50 Cent
- 2004: "Just Lose It" by Eminem
