= Alexia Landeau =

French actress (born 1975)

- Born: February 12, 1975 (age 51); Paris, France
- Occupation: Actress
- Spouse: Guilhem de Castelbajac (m. 2007)

Alexia Landeau (born February 12, 1975) is a French actress. She has appeared in films such as Moonlight Mile, Marie Antoinette, 2 Days in Paris, and 2 Days in New York. She starred in Zoe Cassavetes' Day Out of Days, which premiered at the 2015 Los Angeles Film Festival.

After growing up in Paris, she moved to the United States at age 16. In 2007 she married Guilhem de Castelbajac, the artist son of French designer Jean-Charles de Castelbajac. She lives in Brooklyn.

== Filmography ==
Feature films

- Intern (2000)
- Moonlight Mile (2002)
- Marie Antoinette (2006)
- 2 Days in Paris (2007)
- 2 Days in New York (2012)
- Day Out of Days (2015)

Short films

- Jalouse (2007)
