= Albert Delpy =

French actor and writer

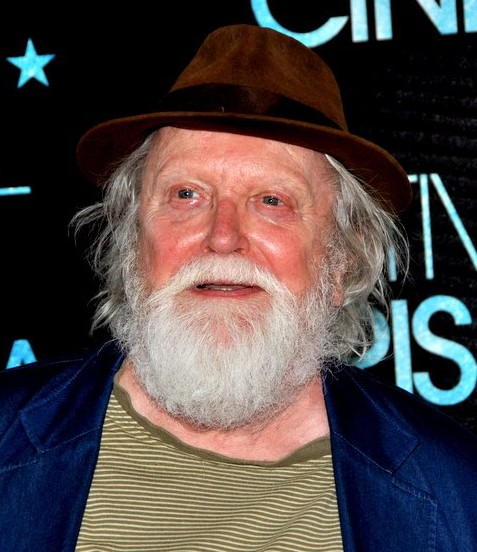
- Delpy in 2012
- Born: 13 September 1940 (age 85); Saigon, Cochinchina, French Indochina
- Occupation: Actor
- Years active: 1961–present
- Spouse: Marie Pillet (m. 1965; died 2009)
- Children: Julie Delpy

Albert Delpy (born 13 September 1940) is a French actor and writer, born in Vietnam. He has appeared in more than one hundred films since 1970.

== Personal life ==
He was married to French actress Marie Pillet until her death in 2009. They are the parents of Julie Delpy and has appeared as her on-screen father in 2 Days in Paris and 2 Days in New York as well as her TV series On the Verge.

== Theater ==
Year	Title	Author	Director
1963	Britannicus	Jean Racine	Claude Bouchery
1964	Peer Gynt	Henrik Ibsen	Michel Hermon
1964	Les Fiancés de Loches	Georges Feydeau	Jean-Paul Farré
1965	Medea	Jean Vauthier	Alain Bézu
1965	On ne badine pas avec l'amour	Alfred de Musset	Jean-Pierre Vincent
1966	They Shoot Horses, Don't They?	Horace McCoy	Christian Dente
1966	Comment peut-on être Persan ?	Sylvie Ollivier	Sylvie Ollivier
1967	Les Petits Hommes	Michel Berto	Michel Berto
1967	Oratorio macabre du radeau de la Méduse	Jérôme Savary	Jérôme Savary
1968	A Memory of Two Mondays	Arthur Miller	Christian Dente
1968-70	L'Île de la raison	Pierre de Marivaux	Michel Berto
1969	The Tempest	William Shakespeare	Michel Berto
1969	Le Mille-pattes	Christian Dente	Christian Dente
1970	Le Roi nu	Evguéni Schwartz	Christian Dente
1970	Les moutons arrivent à fond de train sur des échasses	Fernando Arrabal	Fernando Arrabal
1971	Rosa Rosis	Claire-Lise Charbonnier	Guy Kayat
1971	Un petit nid d'amour	Georges Michel	Alain Scoff
1971	La Petite Voiture de flammes et de voix	Liliane Atlan	Michel Hermon
1972	Cheval-jument	Fernando Arrabal	Fernando Arrabal
1972	Approchez pour entendre	Jean Moiziard	Albert Delpy
1973	L'Appareil-photo	Mireille Franchino	Mireille Franchino
1973-74	And They Put Handcuffs on the Flowers	Fernando Arrabal	Fernando Arrabal
1974-75	Couples	Catherine de Seynes	Catherine de Seynes
1975	La Poisson	René Gaudy	Michel Berto
1975	Speak Quietly or I'll Scream	Leilah Assunção	Albert Delpy
1975	Jeunes Barbares d’aujourd’hui	Fernando Arrabal	Fernando Arrabal
1976	Fear and Misery of the Third Reich	Bertolt Brecht	Jean-Claude Fall
1977	Vole-moi un petit milliard	Fernando Arrabal	Michel Berto & Charles du Besset
1978	Le Ciel et la merde	Fernando Arrabal	Fernando Arrabal
1979	Les quatre jumelles	Copi	Albert Delpy
1982-83	Drôles de bobines	Copi	Albert Delpy
1983	Le Désert	André Gintzburger	Albert Delpy
1984	Edouard II	Christopher Marlowe	Jean-Hugues Anglade
1984	Bréviaire d’amour d’un haltérophile	Fernando Arrabal	Albert Delpy
1985	Apsoss	Jean-Jacques Varoujean	Gérard Gelas
1986	Le Dieu foudroyé	Jean Hamburger	Jean Hamburger
1987	Le Fils	Christian Rullier	François Rancillac
1987	Derniers Masques	Arthur Schnitzler	Gilles Gleizes
1987	Pendant que vous dormiez	Robert Pouderou	Dominique Bluzet
1988	La Traversée de l'empire	Fernando Arrabal	Fernando Arrabal
1988-89	The Seagull	Anton Chekhov	Andrei Konchalovsky
1989	Chemin d'une âme	Friedrich Gorenstein	Josanne Rousseau
1991	Volpone	Ben Jonson	Robert Fortune
1993	Rachat	Friedrich Gorenstein	Josanne Rousseau
1998	Le Sénateur Fox	Luigi Lunari	Jean-Luc Tardieu
1999	Ah Dieu ! Que la guerre est jolie...	Pierre Debauche	Pierre Debauche
1999-2000	Henry V	William Shakespeare	Jean-Louis Benoît
2000	Le Premier et le dernier	Gildas Milin	Gildas Milin
2000-01	Sarcelles-sur-mer	Jean-Pierre Bisson	Stéphane Olivié-Bisson
2002-03	Terminus	Daniel Keene	Laurent Laffargue
2004	Richard II	William Shakespeare	Thierry de Peretti
2005	Laisse moi te dire une chose	Rémi de Vos	Stéphane Fiévet
2005-07	Beware of Pity	Stefan Zweig	Philippe Faure
2006-07	The Balancing Act	Edward Bond	Jérôme Hankins
2007	Gamines	Sylvie Testud	Sylvie Testud
2008	Nous, les héros	Jean-Luc Lagarce	Emmanuel Suarez
2008-09	L’Emmerdeur du 12 bis	Céline Monsarrat	Stella Serfaty
2009-10	One Flea Spare	Naomi Wallace	Marine Mane
2010	Deuxieme chance, double peine	Benjamin Charlery	Benjamin Charlery
2011	L'Art d'être grand-père	Victor Hugo	Vincent Colin
2011-12	Toboggan	Gildas Milin	Gildas Milin

== Filmography ==
Year	Title	Role	Director	Notes
1970	La Horse	A journalist	Pierre Granier-Deferre	
1972	Chut !		Jean-Pierre Mocky	
1972	Albert Einstein	An Olympia member	Gérard Chouchan	TV movie
1973	The Year 01	The thief	Jacques Doillon, Alain Resnais & Jean Rouch	
1973	La ligne de démarcation	Milo	Jacques Ertaud	TV series (1 episode)
1974	Un mystère par jour	Bernard	Jean-Paul Carrère	TV series (1 episode)
1975	Fear Over the City	Henri Vernellic	Henri Verneuil	
1975	Pique-nique en campagne	Jacques	Georges Senechal	Short
1975	Les Rosenberg ne doivent pas mourir	Morton Sobell	Stellio Lorenzi	TV movie
1976	The Tenant	Neighbor	Roman Polanski	
1977	Le pays bleu	Armand	Jean-Charles Tacchella	
1977	Désiré Lafarge	Niels	Jean-Pierre Gallo	TV series (1 episode)
1978	Molière	Nicolas Boileau	Ariane Mnouchkine	
1978	L'amant de poche	The father	Bernard Queysanne	
1978	Guerres civiles en France		François Barat	
1979	Subversion		Stanislav Stanojevic	
1979	Le procès de Riom	The journalist	Henri Calef	TV movie
1979	Un juge, un flic	The reporter	Denys de La Patellière	TV series (1 episode)
1980	La bande du Rex		Jean-Henri Meunier	
1980	L'histoire du cahier anonyme		Olivier Douyère	Short
1980	Petit déjeuner compris	Jean-Paul Perrault	Michel Berny	TV mini-series
1980	Les 400 coups de Virginie	Marius	Bernard Queysanne	TV mini-series
1980	Messieurs les jurés	Jean-Michel Dardez	André Michel	TV series (1 episode)
1981	Ali in Wonderland	Jean-Christophe	Ahmed Rachedi	
1981	La gueule du loup		Michel Léviant	
1981	Un dessert pour Constance		Sarah Maldoror	TV movie
1981	Médecins de nuit	Roger	Peter Kassovitz	TV series (1 episode)
1982	Xueiv		Patrick Brunie	
1982	Niveau moins trois		Geoffroy Larcher	Short
1982	Deuil en vingt-quatre heures		Frank Cassenti	TV mini-series
1983	Les Bancals	Alain	Hervé Lièvre	Also writer
1983	Diane Lanster	The director	Bernard Queysanne	TV movie
1983	Après tout ce qu'on a fait pour toi		Jacques Fansten	TV movie
1983	Merci Bernard		Jean-Michel Ribes	TV series (1 episode)
1983	Secret diplomatique	Louis	Claude Barrois	TV series (1 episode)
1984	Paris vu par... 20 ans après		Bernard Dubois	
1984	La mèche en bataille	A pawn	Bernard Dubois	TV movie
1985	Novembermond		Alexandra von Grote	
1985	Tea in the Harem	Pelletier	Mehdi Charef	
1985	He Died with His Eyes Open	Forensic scientist	Jacques Deray	
1985	Le monde désert	Bidermann	Pierre Beuchot	TV movie
1985	Le marionnettiste	The academy employee	Raphaël Delpard	TV movie
1986	Twist again à Moscou		Jean-Marie Poiré	
1986	Madame et ses flics	Various	Roland-Bernard	TV series (3 episodes)
1987	Tandem	Driver red dog	Patrice Leconte	
1987	Miss Mona	Jean	Mehdi Charef	
1987	Le moustachu	The restaurant owner	Dominique Chaussois	
1987	L'oeil au beurre noir	The hardware store owner	Serge Meynard	
1987	Ring		Bourlem Guerdjou & Franck Jaen	Short
1987	L'or noir de Lornac	A citizen	Tony Flaadt	TV series (1 episode)
1988	Camomille	The baker	Mehdi Charef	
1988	L'autre nuit	The uncle	Jean-Pierre Limosin	
1988	Il y a maldonne	The taxi driver	John Berry	
1988	Envoyez les violons	The cinema owner	Roger Andrieux	
1988	La queue de la comète	Paolo	Hervé Lièvre	
1988	Civilisations	Kaserine	Patrick Meunier	TV mini-series
1988	Les enquêtes du commissaire Maigret	The café owner	Youri	TV series (1 episode)
1989	Céleri remoulade	The astrologer	Jean-Pierre Biazotti	Short
1989	La clé n'est pas dans le pot de géranium		Manuela Gourary	Short
1989	Les jupons de la révolution	The bourgeois	Miguel Courtois	TV series (1 episode)
1990	Maman	The sailor	Romain Goupil	
1990	Je t'ai dans la peau	Roger	Jean-Pierre Thorn	
1990	The Hairdresser's Husband	Donecker	Patrice Leconte	
1990	Cohabitation		Daniel Delume	Short
1990	Les lendemains qui tuent	Sorbon	Daniel Duval	TV movie
1990	La vierge noire	The café owner	Igaal Niddam	TV mini-series
1991	Arthur Rimbaud, une biographie	Georges Izambard	Richard Dindo	
1992	Méchant garçon	Roger	Charles Gassot	
1992	Les Enfants du naufrageur		Jérôme Foulon	
1993	The Man by the Shore	Assad	Raoul Peck	
1993	Ferbac	Doctor Alphan	Bruno Gantillon	TV series (1 episode)
1994	Colonel Chabert	Maître Roguin	Yves Angelo	
1994	L'exil du roi Behanzin	The doctor	Guy Deslauriers	
1994	Julie Lescaut	Désiré	Josée Dayan	TV series (1 episode)
1996	Ridicule	Baron de Guéret	Patrice Leconte	
1996	Les Grands Ducs	Harry	Patrice Leconte	
1996	Il fait nuit dans ma tête	The strange man	Sébastien Lafarge & Rafael Schneider	Short
1996	En garde, monsieur		Didier Fontan	Short
1996	Maigret	The captain	Charles Nemes	TV series (1 episode)
1997	Marthe	The adjutant	Jean-Loup Hubert	
1997	Bonne fête papa	Tom	Didier Fontan	TV movie
1998	Ici		Jérôme Bouyer	Short
1998	Tatoo	The taulier	Grégori Baquet	Short
1998	Cha cha cha		Philippe Blasband	Short
1998	Les trois soeurs		Guy-Philippe Bertin	Short
1998	Le dragon nocturne		Frédéric Loustalot	Short
1998	The Count of Monte Cristo	The host	Josée Dayan	TV mini-series
1999	One 4 All	The colleague	Claude Lelouch	
1999	L'âme-soeur	Balthazar	Jean-Marie Bigard	
1999	Sachs' Disease	The pharmacy client	Michel Deville	
1999	Docteur Sylvestre	The grand father	Didier Grousset	TV series (1 episode)
2000	Le prof	The education advisor	Alexandre Jardin	
2000	Le sens des affaires	Edouard	Guy-Philippe Bertin	
2000	Le coup du lapin	The priest	Didier Grousset	TV movie
2001	Affaire Libinski		Delphine Jaquet & Philippe Lacôte	Short
2002	Aram	Nasar	Robert Kechichian	
2002	Mille millièmes	M. Maréchal	Rémi Waterhouse	
2002	Villa des Roses	Antoine Créteur	Frank Van Passel	
2002	Quelqu'un de bien	The doctor	Patrick Timsit	
2002	Le nouveau Jean-Claude	Marianna's father	Didier Tronchet	
2003	Là-haut, un roi au-dessus des nuages	The journalist	Pierre Schoendoerffer	
2004	Before Sunset	Man at Grill	Richard Linklater	
2004	Vive mon entreprise	Fernand	Daniel Losset	TV movie
2005	Moshi moshi		Florence Bresson	Short
2006	Lili et le baobab	The mayor	Chantal Richard	
2006	À la recherche de Kafka		Jorge Amat	
2006	Jeanne à petits pas	Emile	Négar Djavadi	Short
2007	2 Days in Paris	Jeannot	Julie Delpy	
2008	Beauties at War	The mayor's father	Patrice Leconte	
2008	Les atomes ne meurent jamais	Hugo Marteens	Didier Fontan	Short
2008	Chez Maupassant	The mayor	Olivier Schatzky	TV series (1 episode)
2010	Mammuth	Pierre	Gustave Kervern & Benoît Delépine	
2010	Je vous aime très beaucoup	Raymond	Philippe Locquet	
2010	Leçon de ténèbres	Mittwoch	Sarah Arnold	Short
2010	Équipe médicale d'urgence	Monsieur Saless	Étienne Dhaene	TV series (1 episode)
2011	Le Skylab	Uncle Hubert	Julie Delpy	
2011	Expresso	Paul	Vincent Harter	Short
2012	2 Days in New York	Jeannot	Julie Delpy	
2012	Je ne suis pas mort	Michel	Mehdi Ben Attia	
2012	Yasmine	Maurice	Karim Bengana	Short
2012	Déferlente	The narrator	Winifrey Bandera-Guzman & Zoé Delépine	Short
2012	Après l'Enfer	Old man	François Pragnere	Short
2012	Clémenceau	Claude Monet	Olivier Guignard	TV movie
2013	Eyjafjallajökull	Tonton Roger	Alexandre Coffre	
2013	Love Love Love	Jo	Bruno Mercier	
2013	A.D.N., l'âme de la terre	The mayor	Thierry Obadia	
2013	The Rendez-Vous of Déjà-Vu	The patient	Antonin Peretjatko	
2013	Braconnière	Raymond	Martin Tronquart	Short
2014	Soleils	The printer	Olivier Delahaye & Dani Kouyaté	
2014	So Long	Clop-clop	Bruno Mercier	
2014	Michel	Michel	Romain Richard	Short
2014	Totems	Emile	Sarah Arnold	Short
2014	Réminiscence	Sage	Ariane Aggiage	Short
2015	Lolo	The visitor	Julie Delpy	
2015	Anton Tchékhov 1890	The governor	René Féret	
2015	La course	The mayor	Bérenger Thouin	Short
2015	Les photographes	Jacob	Aurélien Vernhes-Lermusiaux	Short
2015	Une nuit au Grévin	The seated man	Patrice Leconte	TV movie
2016	Mon père dit des conneries		Shahriar Shandiz	Short
2017	Plonger	Léo	Mélanie Laurent	
2017	Rattrapage	Socrate	Tristan Séguéla	
2017	Sales gosses	Monsieur Pascal	Frédéric Quiring	
2017	Comment j'ai rencontré mon père	André Berthet	Maxime Motte	
2018	Cowboy Camembert	Jacky	Nicolas Bellenchombre & Cédric Tanguy	
2018	Tous les dieux du ciel	Dédé	Quarxx	
2018	L'union fait la force	The old man	Céline Fuhrer & Emmanuel Matte	Short
2019	Deerskin	Monsieur B.	Quentin Dupieux	
2019	Portraitist	André	Cyrus Neshvad	Short; Falcon International Film Festival - Best Actor; Fort Lauderdale International Film Festival - Best Actor; Liverpool International Film Festival - Best Actor; Montreal International Wreath Awards Film Festival - Best Actor; Richmond International Film Festival - Best Actor
2019	Marilyn & I	René	Jérémie Loiseau	Short
2020	Balai	Albert	Matthieu Moerlen	Short
2020	En pleine Lulu	René	Marguerite Pellerin	Short
2021	Belle enfant	Remy	Thierry Terrasson Jim	
2021	Eggshelter	Paul	Raphael Bluzet	Short
2021	Deus Ex Machina	The old man	Jessy Langlois	Short
2021	Princesse de Jérusalem	Father	Guillaume Levil & Nicolas Paban	Short
2021	On the Verge	Justine's father	David Petrarca	TV series (1 episode)
2021	Capitaine Marleau	Jean-Claude	Josée Dayan	TV series (1 episode)
2022	En roue libre	The old man	Didier Barcelo	
2022	La France par une longue nuit de sommeil profond	The old man	Matthieu Moerlen	Short
2023	La sirène se marie		Achraf Ajraoui	Short
2024	Le somnambule	Neighbor	Hugo Parthonnaud	Short
2024	Les barbares		Julie Delpy	
