= Adult education in Nazi Germany =

Adult education (German: Erwachsenenbildung) in Nazi Germany was institutional continuing education for persons who had completed their schooling. After the synchronization of university extension programs (Volkshochschulen) and their municipal or private sponsors, the German Labor Front (DAF) made its influence felt in two ways. Within its National Socialist Strength Through Joy organization, it founded the German Public Instruction Agency (Deutsche Volksbildungswerk; DVW) in 1935. Moreover, after 1933 it used the Office for Vocational Education and Business Management to influence commercial education. The German Institute for National Socialist Technical Vocational Training (Dinta) gave rise to the German Vocational Education Agency (Deutsches Berufserziehungswerk), which organized "practice groups" (Übungsgemeinschaften) that by 1938 had 2 million participants; its workplace programs involved another 1.3 million. These operations should be distinguished from the "community schooling" (Gemeinschaftsschulung) of employers, foremen, and workers through courses in the German Labor Front's Reich schools.

== Functions ==
Above all, adult education had functions not provided by the mass organizations of National Socialism, with their "ideological orientation and selection" and their military training. The adult education offerings had more to do with the economic predicament and the demand for continuing education and ideological orientation than with political schooling. During the war, new areas of activity arose through the combining of work with vocational or general-educational correspondence courses, as well as through continuing education for persons with war-related disabilities. In 1943, the DVW established a night school (Abendoberschule) in Munich. It supported social and cultural courses given by so-called guardians of public instruction (Volksbildungswarte) in the workplaces.

== Mobilization of the rural population ==
The 300 offices for public instruction also attempted to mobilize the rural population for culture. Their program of instruction was largely based on a model curriculum created in 1939 by Reich and Gau work groups for adult education. Instead of consolidation of adult education taking place through Reich legislation, a goal aimed at in 1933, the DVW gained dominance through the financial resources made available from DAF dues; in 1943 it was upgraded to a leadership office (Führungsamt) in the DAF. Adult education should not be underestimated as an integrating element, even if its educational offerings primarily served the collective increase of power.

== Bibliography ==
- Christian Zentner, Friedemann Bedürftig (1991). The Encyclopedia of the Third Reich, pp. 8-9. Macmillan, New York. ISBN 0-02-897502-2
