= Céline Monsarrat =

French actress (born 1954)

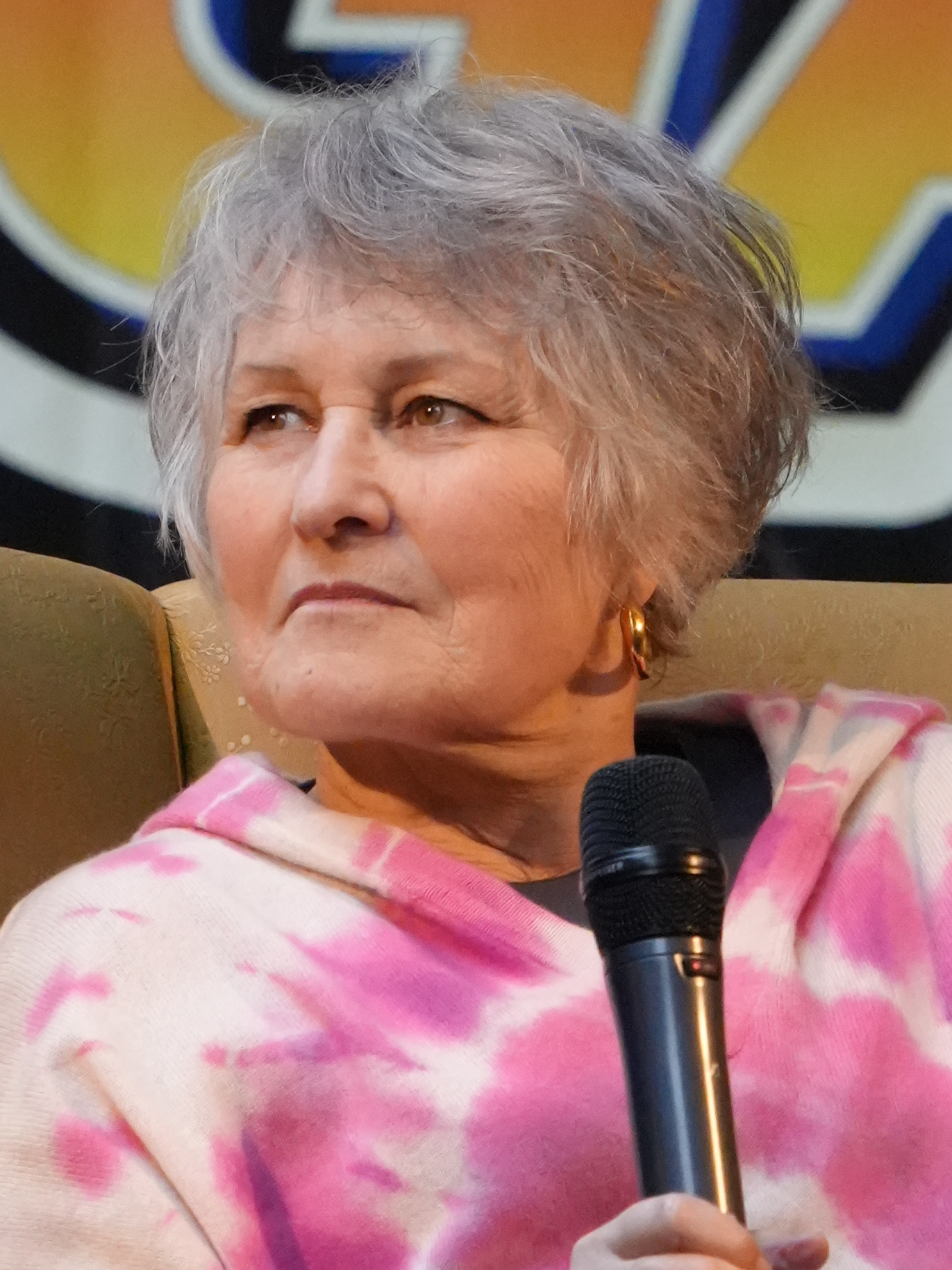
Montsarrat in 2025

Céline Monsarrat (born January 13, 1954, Casablanca) is a French actress best known for her voice dubbing work. Monsarrat is the French dubbing voice of Julia Roberts in all of her films, the voice of Dory in the French dub of Finding Nemo, the French dubbing voice of Anne Heche, and the voice of Anastasia in the animated film of the same name. Monsarrat is also a playwright, and has contributed many plays to the world of theater.

== Selected voice roles ==
- Julia Roberts (Mystic Pizza, Closer, Pretty Woman, Notting Hill and Erin Brockovich among many others)
- Lea Thompson (in the Back to the Future trilogy)
- Courteney Cox (in the Scream trilogy)
- Anne Heche (Six Days Seven Nights, Birth)
- Dory in Finding Nemo
- Dorothy in The Wizard of Oz
- Anastasia in Anastasia (only speaking voice, singing voice by Katia Markosy)
- Cheryl Ladd (Charlie's Angels, Charmed)
- Dr. Elsa Schneider (Indiana Jones and the Last Crusade)
- Elisa Fernandes (Escrava Isaura)
- Amy Pietz (Caroline in the City)
- Melina Kanakaredes (CSI: NY)
- Smurfette (The Smurfs)
- Bulma, Chi-Chi (Dragon Ball Z)
- Clémentine in the series of the same name
- Charles De Girl in Valiant
- Madame de Réant, Les malheurs de Sophie, 1998
