= Solomon Perel =

Israeli author and motivational speaker (1925–2023)

- סולומון פרל
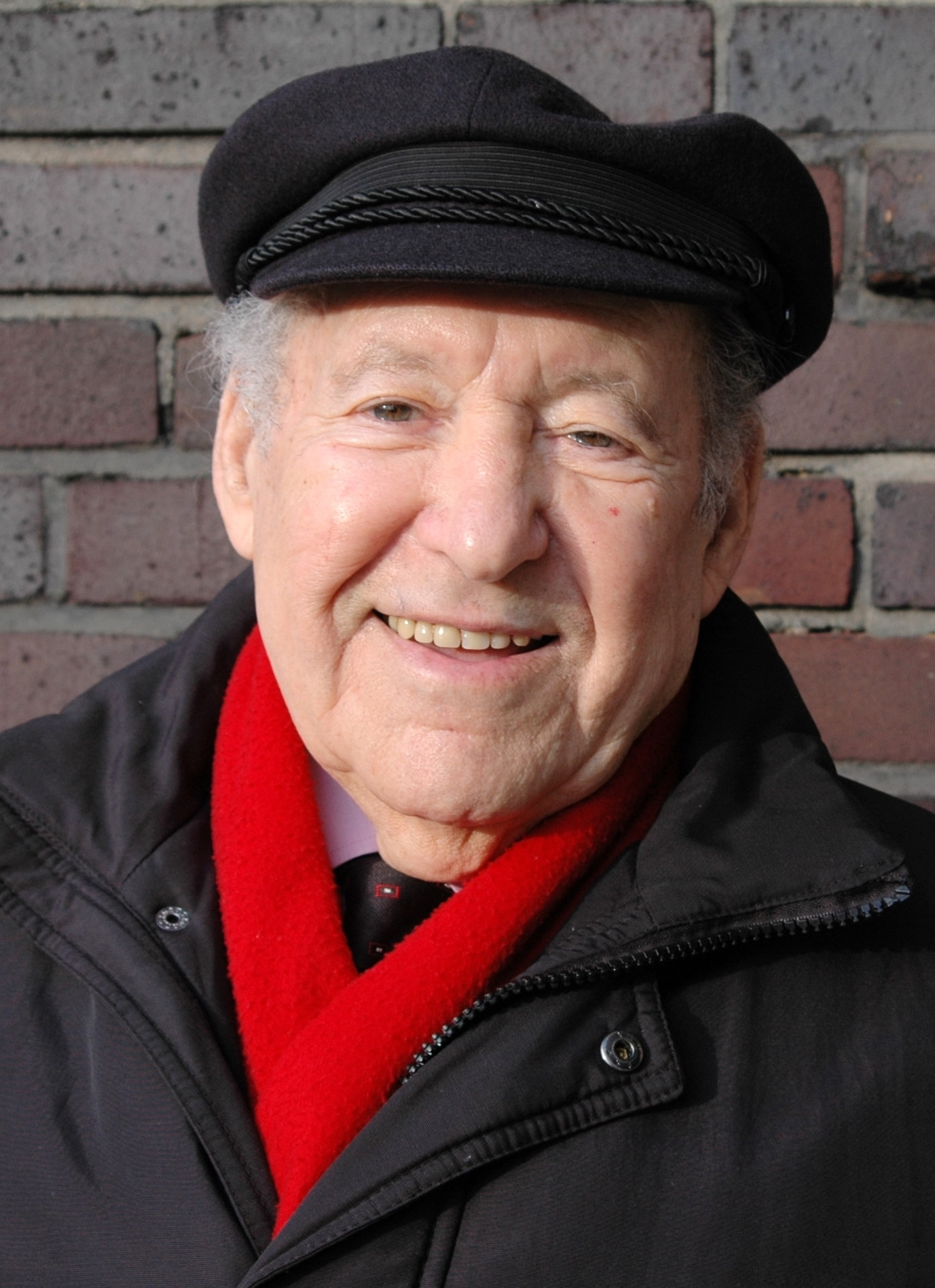
- Perel in 2016
- Born: 21 April 1925; Peine, Hanover, Prussia, Germany
- Died: 2 February 2023 (aged 97); Tel Aviv, Israel
- Occupations: Author; motivational speaker

Solomon Perel (also Shlomo Perel or Solly Perel; 21 April 1925 – 2 February 2023) was a German-born Israeli author and motivational speaker. He was born to a German-Jewish family and managed to escape persecution by the Nazis by masquerading as an ethnic German. His life story is told in the 1990 film Europa Europa which was loosely based on his autobiography Ich war Hitlerjunge Salomon (I Was Hitler Youth Salomon). He also made several visits to various schools to tell his story.

== Biography ==
Solomon Perel was born on 21 April 1925 in Peine, Lower Saxony, to Jewish parents who had immigrated to Germany from Russia. When the Nazis came to power, systematic persecution of Germany's Jewish citizens began. In 1935, the Perel family relocated to Łódź, Poland, where Solomon's aunt lived, after their shoe store was looted and Perel was expelled from his school.

After the Germans invaded Poland in September 1939, Solomon Perel and his brother Yitzhak attempted to escape to the Soviet-occupied part of Poland. Solomon succeeded and was placed in a Komsomol-run orphanage in Grodno, while his brother made his way to Vilnius in Lithuania.

Perel fled from the orphanage after the Nazis invaded the Soviet Union in June 1941 and was captured near Grodno by the 12th Panzer Division. Since he was a native German speaker, Perel was able to convince his captors that he was a Volksdeutscher (an ethnic German living outside Germany) and was subsequently accepted into his captors' unit as a Russian–German interpreter. Solomon became endeared to his German army unit, and many years later, already in Israel, was invited to the 12th Panzer Division Reunion. The unit's commanding officer even made plans to adopt him, providing him with further protection. In his capacity of an interpreter, he later participated in interrogation of Joseph Stalin's son, Yakov Dzhugashvili, who was captured near Liozna. Contrary to the fictionalized description in the movie Europa Europa, this episode did not affect his career in the Wehrmacht, as it happened much later than his own capture. As a circumcised Jew, Perel was constantly in danger of being discovered by his military unit and attempted on several occasions to flee back to the Soviets, each time unsuccessfully. He conjured various excuses to avoid medical examinations that would have revealed he was circumcised. One army doctor took a sexual interest in him, and on one night when he had entered the shower after everyone else had left, the doctor attacked him from behind and attempted to rape him. Perel managed to fight him off, but when he turned around, the doctor saw that he was circumcised and realized he was a Jew. The doctor did not inform on Perel, as doing so would have exposed him as a homosexual. According to Perel, "I knew his secret and he knew mine, and after that incident he took care of me until he was killed."

Being still a minor, Perel was told he could not remain with the army. Instead, he was sent to a Hitler Youth boarding school in Braunschweig, where he continued to hide his Jewish identity under the name of Josef Perjell (changed to Josef Peters for the film Europa Europa). While there he was put through classes on Nazi racial theory and pre-military preparation exercises. In order to hide the fact that he was circumcised, he refrained from showering with other students whenever possible or showered while facing the wall or while wearing underwear. At the time, he had a girlfriend by the name of Leni Latsch. She was a member of the Nazi-instituted League of German Girls (BDM), so although Perel loved Leni, he dared not tell her that he was Jewish, fearing of her informing the authorities. Later, Leni's widowed mother discovered he was Jewish but did not reveal his secret.

Towards the end of the war, Perel was drafted into the army as an infantryman and assigned to guard a bridge armed with a Panzerfaust. On the night of 20 April 1945, the eve of his 20th birthday, shortly after he had been inducted into the army, Perel was captured by the United States Army, without having engaged in combat. He was released the next day as he was a junior conscript. After the end of the war, he briefly served as an interpreter for the Red Army. After traveling back to his birthplace, and making dozens of inquiries, he finally located his brother Yitzhak, who was also able to escape to the Soviet Union, and at that time was married and living in Munich (in the movie, Yitzhak survives a Nazi camp and meets Solomon accidentally after being liberated by the Red Army). Perel moved to Munich to be with him. He learned that his father had died of starvation in the Łódź Ghetto, his mother was murdered in a gassing truck in 1944, and his sister was shot while on a death march. Likewise, he learned that his other brother, David, was alive and in Mandatory Palestine. Solomon resolved to join him, and in July 1948 sailed for Haifa in the newly declared state of Israel.

Once in Israel, Perel was inducted into the Israel Defense Forces (IDF) and fought in the 1948 Arab–Israeli War. After being released from the Israeli army, he became a businessman. In 1959, he married his wife Dvora and together, they had two sons. Perel did not return to Germany until 1985, at the invitation of the Mayor of Peine, to participate in a commemoration of the destruction of the Peine Synagogue.

Perel died in Tel Aviv, Israel on 2 February 2023, at the age of 97.

== I Was Hitler Youth Salomon ==
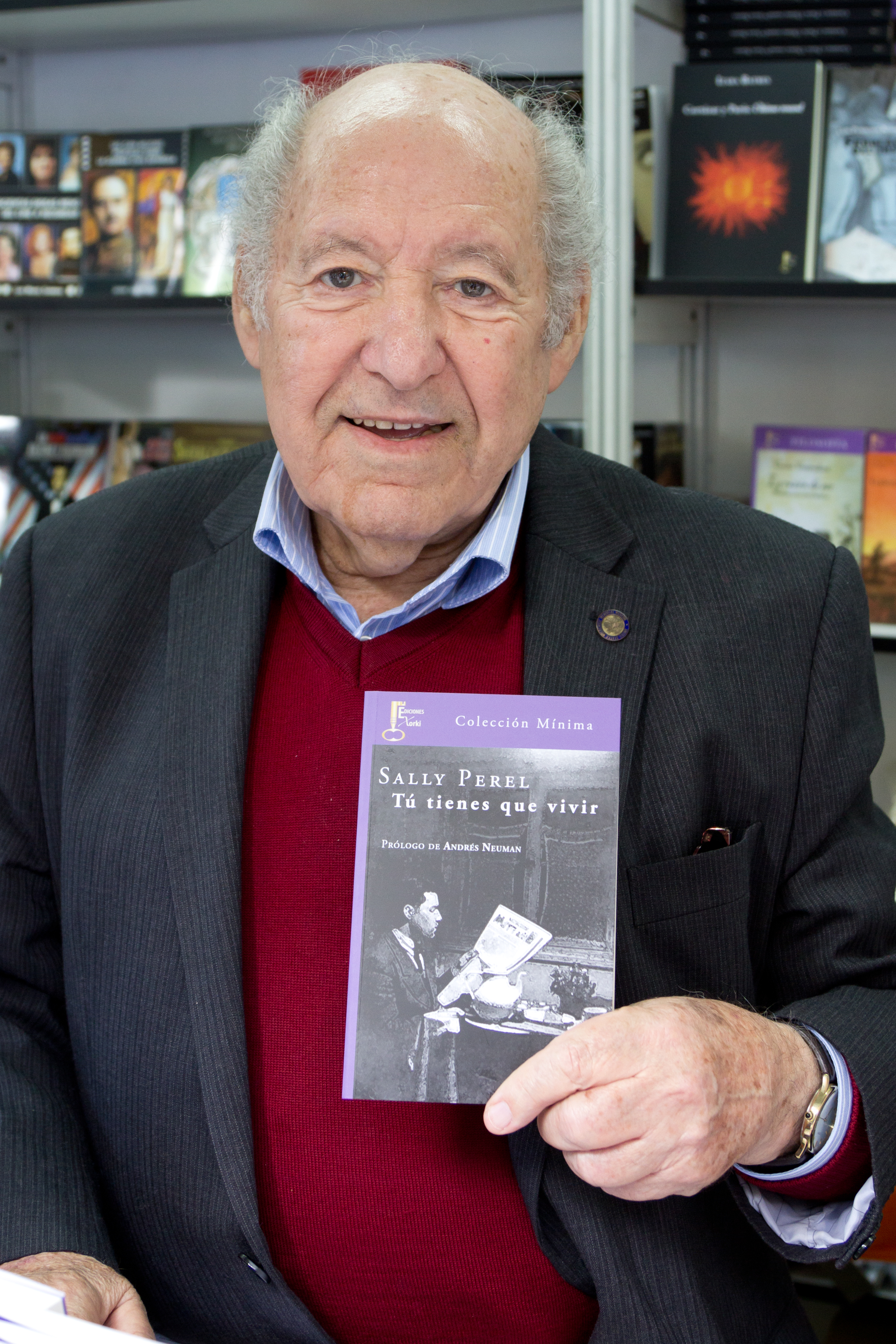
Perel in 2014

Perel later wrote a book about his exploits, titled Ich war Hitlerjunge Salomon (I Was Hitler Youth Salomon). His work was later adapted into the 1990 film Europa Europa, produced by CCC Film. He often toured and gave talks throughout Europe about his wartime experiences.

The Dutch playwright Carl Slotboom wrote at the request of Salomon Perel a play based on Perel's story titled Du sollst leben (Dutch: Je zult leven; English: You shall live), which was first staged in Waalwijk, Netherlands, in 2002, which is also Remembrance of the Dead in the Netherlands. Solomon Perel visited Waalwijk, Zevenbergen and Abbekerk (Netherlands) to see the play.

== See also ==
- Europa Europa
