= Great Wall of Los Angeles =

Mural in Los Angeles, California, United States

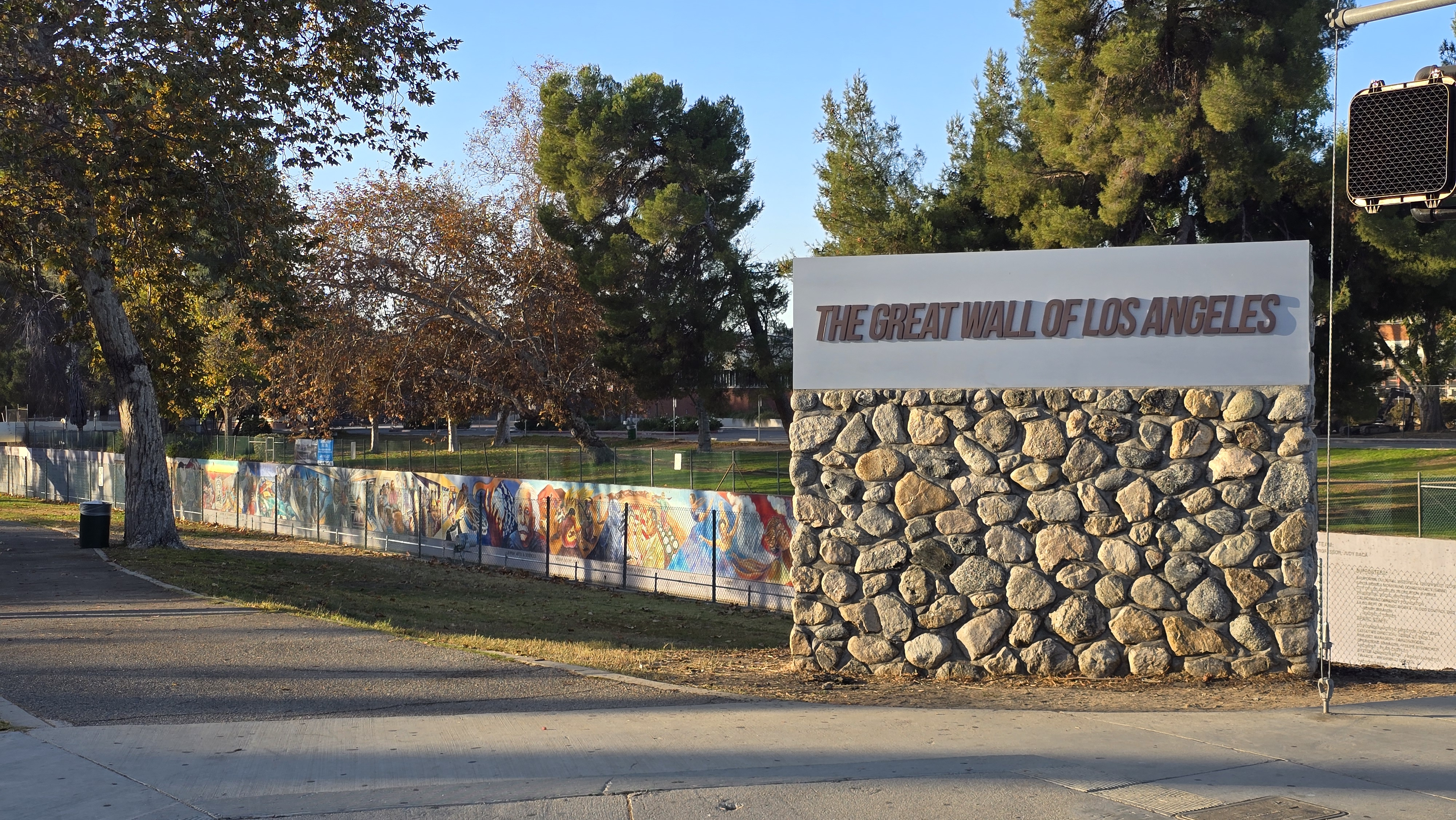
- The northern terminus of The Great Wall of Los Angeles at the intersection of Oxnard Street and Coldwater Canyon Avenue, December 2024
- Artist: Judy Baca
- Year: 1978
- Completion date: 1984
- Type: Public Art, Mural
- Medium: Paint on Concrete
- Subject: History of California
- Dimensions: 4.0 m × 840 m (13 feet × 2754 feet)
- Location: Los Angeles; 34°10′34″N 118°24′51″W
- Website: sparcinla.org/programs/the-great-wall-mural-los-angeles/
- The Great Wall of Los Angeles
- U.S. National Register of Historic Places
- Location within San Fernando Valley Location within the Los Angeles metropolitan area Location within California Location within the United States
- Location: Coldwater Canyon Avenue; Valley Glen, Los Angeles, California, United States
- Coordinates: 34.179084°N 118.413782°W
- NRHP reference No.: 100001602
- Added to NRHP: September 18, 2017

The Great Wall of Los Angeles is a 1978 mural designed by Judith Baca and executed with the help of over 400 community youth and artists coordinated by the Social and Public Art Resource Center (SPARC). The mural, on the concrete banks of Tujunga Wash in the San Fernando Valley was Baca's first mural and SPARC's first public art project. Under the official title of The History of California, it was listed on the National Register of Historic Places in 2017.

== Description ==
The Great Wall is located on Coldwater Canyon Avenue between Oxnard Street and Burbank Boulevard and the eastern edge of the Valley College campus in the San Fernando Valley community of Valley Glen. It is on the concrete sides of the Tujunga Wash, a tributary of the Los Angeles River. The mural is 13 feet (4.0 m) high, painted directly on concrete. With a length of 2,754 feet (840 m) (covering over 6 city blocks), it is credited as one of the longest murals in the world.

== Subject matter and style ==
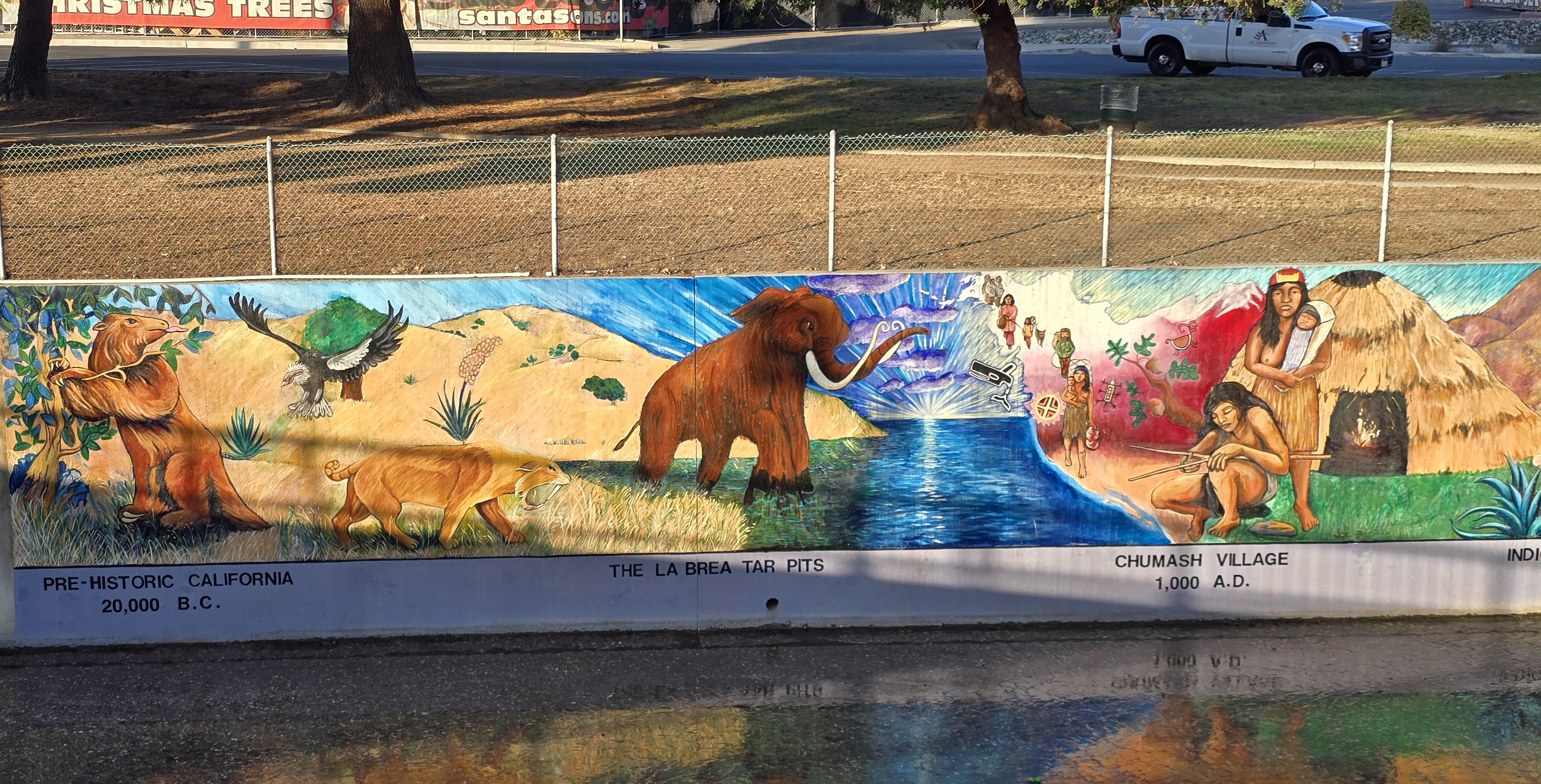
The southern terminus of the Great Wall features Prehistoric California, labelled as 20,000 BC, a Columbian mammoth getting trapped in the La Brea Tar Pits, and the earliest evidence of Chumash settlement, labelled as 1,000 AD

The Great Wall of Los Angeles depicts the history of California "as seen through the eyes of women and minorities" in many connected panels. The Great Wall of Los Angeles places emphasis on the often overlooked history of Native Americans, ethnic and religious minorities, LGBTQ people, and those fighting for civil rights. Baca recalls that at the time, there was a lack of public art that represented the diverse heritage of Los Angeles. The mural is considered a cultural landmark as it was created in conjunction with the rise of the Chicano Movement of the 1960s-1980s.

The first panels begin with prehistory and colonialism. The very first panel was designed by Christina Schlesinger and depicts native wildlife and the creation story of the indigenous Chumash. Most of the following panels deal with events of the 20th century, including Chinese labor contributions to the United States, the arrival of Jewish refugees (fleeing oppression and the Holocaust) and their contributions to the culture and history of Los Angeles, refugees from the Dust Bowl, the Great Depression, the Japanese-American internment of World War II, the Zoot Suit Riots, the Freedom Bus rides, the disappearance of Rosie the Riveter, gay rights activism, the story of Biddy Mason, deportations of Mexican Americans, the birth of rock and roll, and the development of suburbia. The wall covers the history of California up to the 1950s. Each section of the wall was designed by a different artist under the supervision of Baca.

The style of the mural is considered to be Social Realism., with the design and composition of the wall considered major aspects of the art's appeal. Baca's composition uses sweeping lines broken up by a sense of movement from the characters and subjects depicted.

Because the Great Wall of Los Angeles depicts historical events, the mural is part of Grant High School and Valley College's curriculum.

== History ==
The possibility of creating the mural was first brought up in 1974 when Baca was contacted by the Army Corps of Engineers about a beautification project. While Baca was working as a consultant for the Tujunga Wash Greenbelt Project, she was offered the chance to beautify the flood-control channel. The wall along the river was considered an eyesore, or in Baca's view, "a scar where the river once ran". Funding from the Comprehensive Employment and Training Act (CETA) enabled her to assemble an artist workforce to begin the mural. The Great Wall of Los Angeles as an idea was more fully fleshed out in 1976 by Baca. Baca chose to do an epic-sized history of Los Angeles county, going back to the time of the dinosaurs. She first researched highlights of Los Angeles history on her own.

During the summer of 1977, Baca studied at the Taller Siqueiros in Cuernavaca to reinforce her knowledge of mural techniques, studying preservation, chemistry, and more. She studied the polyangular theory of David Alfaro Siqueiros, which deals with the differences between mural and easel painting.

The project, named Social and Public Art Resource Center (SPARC), converted an abandoned Venice police station into mural headquarters. The site was used to coordinate workshops, archive materials relating to the project, and run other programs.

In addition to the many experts in various academic fields, Baca recruited a team of artists to help with the project, including Isabel Castro, Yreina Cervantez, Judithe Hernández, Olga Munoz, Patssi Valdez, Margaret Garcia, Christina Schlesinger, Judy Chicago, and Gary Tokumoto. With the additional help of the city, the Corps of Engineers, and SPARC, Baca was ready to start work by the summer of 1978.

Each section of the Great Wall of Los Angeles was developed through a process called "Imagining of Content", which was developed at SPARC. The process includes research, inviting experts in various fields relating to the content, and members of the group working collectively to decide important cultural, political, artistic, and historical stories. The process also includes interviewing people who lived through parts of history, if possible. Imagining of Content is designed to help weed out biases. The artists involved with the process would take the information, create thumbnail sketches, and then submit these drawings to critique. The chosen thumbnails were finished in color and then transferred to the wall in large scale. The process from start to finish for each section of the wall took about a year.

Originally, 80 young people from the juvenile justice program were recruited to help work on the mural. They worked about 25 hours a week at minimum wage. The diversity of backgrounds among the young people was a challenge for Baca to coordinate. She recalls that there were "warring neighborhoods" and that her teams spoke many different languages. In addition, the people who lived in the middle-class neighborhood of Tujunga Wash were skeptical that this "invasion of juvenile delinquents" would behave themselves. Baca found a way to make things work harmoniously. The young workers knew her as the "mural lady". She mentored many young people during the project. Baca felt that they were able to learn many useful skills, such as math, history, and art which many of them had few of these skills mastered at the time. In the years 1981 and 1983, additional young people were hired through a grant from the Jewish Community Foundation. Over 400 young people helped paint the mural over the course of 6 summers. The names of the young people who worked on the Great Wall of Los Angeles are recorded in various places on the mural. In addition, the work of 40 historians and 40 different artists helped make the Great Wall of Los Angeles a reality. Toward the very end of the project, a flood washed away all the necessary materials the artists needed to finish the project, including the scaffolding. The community donated $20,000, which was collected in the span of two weeks, to help the artists complete their work. The Great Wall of Los Angeles was finished in 1984.

== Refurbishing and expansion ==
Over time, the mural suffered environmental damage and required restoration. Between 1976 and 1983, the mural was flooded five times. Pollution and direct sun also eroded the art. It was estimated that it would cost over $400,000 to restore the Great Wall. A wooden pedestrian bridge that was used to view the wall became too worn over time and was removed as well.

It was restored in 2011. The Santa Barbara-based Youth CineMedia program was chosen as the "official documentarians" of the restoration project in 2011. Restoration of the mural included artists and some of the original youth from the project putting in 8- and 12-hour days to complete the work.

Due to its relative inaccessibility, there are still challenges in viewing the Great Wall in its entirety. Plans for a bridge and solar lighting to allow additional viewing of the mural has been proposed as of 2014. A bridge will allow visitors to the mural to get closer to the art. The bridge was supposed to be part of the 2011 refurbishing project but was never completed. The Los Angeles County Board of Supervisors approved a plan for the pedestrian bridge in 2014. The project is estimated to cost around $1.3 million and will be funded by the county, the city, the Santa Monica Mountains Conservancy, and the California Cultural Historical Endowment.

Plans to continue the history of California beyond the 1950s are in the works. The National Endowment for the Arts (NEA) has provided funds for the initial designs for the 1960s panel and for the scenes from the '70s and '80s. SPARC plans for the mural to be a mile long when sections for the 1970s through the 1990s are complete.

In addition to a pedestrian bridge and additional history panels, plans for picnic tables, restrooms, educational information, and benches are being considered.

The Great Wall of Los Angeles is in the process of extending its art. It has been a process that has been underway for awhile at LACMA. Hundreds of artists have been working on it and the mural will consist of other stories. Issues regarding minorities, and movements that are not as well-known will be depicted in the extended mural.

== Comments by Baca ==
"Public art in America has taken a shift; it's basically becoming decorative. They've reduced the community process to censorship. The Great Wall, for example, could not be done today."—Judith Baca, 2000

"It's not just history, it's really about relationships—about connecting."—Judith Baca, 2004

"The people who have worked on this project gave much more than their time. They made a giant monument to interracial harmony."—Judith Baca, 2000

== See also ==
- Social and Public Art Resource Center
- Tujunga Wash Greenway
- National Register of Historic Places listings in Los Angeles
- Murals of Los Angeles
