= Under the Stars =

Under the Stars may refer to:

- Under the Stars (1993 film)
- Under the Stars (2001 film)
- Under the Stars (2007 film)
- Under the Stars (2025 film)
- Under the Stars (album), a 2016 album by ATB
