= Mathieu Demy =

French actor, film director and producer

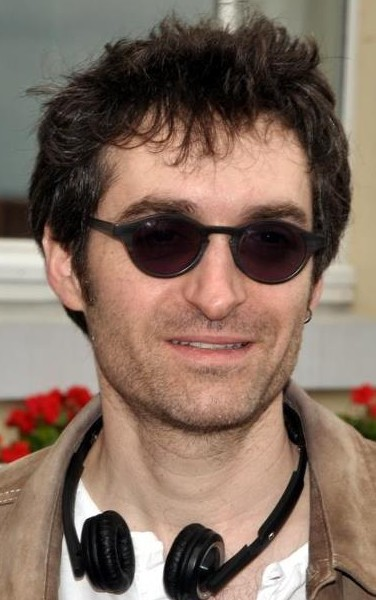
- Demy in 2012
- Born: 15 October 1972 (age 53); Paris, France
- Occupations: Actor, film director
- Parent(s): Jacques Demy; Agnès Varda
- Relatives: Rosalie Varda (half-sister)

Mathieu Demy (born 15 October 1972) is a French actor, film director, and producer.

He is the son of French film directors Agnès Varda and Jacques Demy.

== Career ==
Demy started as a young actor in Agnès Varda's films L'une chante, l'autre pas (One Sings, the Other Doesn't), Documenteur, Mur Murs and Kung Fu Master.

Demy's work as an actor ranges from romantic comedy to drama. His breakthrough came in 1998, when he was cast as Olivier, a young man with AIDS, in the musical Jeanne et le Garçon formidable, directed by Olivier Ducastel and Jacques Martineau.

In 1999, he started a company, Les Films de l’Autre, to produce his own short films. In 2000, he produced and directed his first film, Le Plafond (35’), adapted from a short story by Tonino Benacquista. The film received the audience award at the Angers film festival Festival Premiers Plans and the Uppsala International Short film Festival, and additional awards in Pantin, Rennes, Dignes and Mamers.

In 2001, Demy worked for director Benoît Cohen in the film Les Acteurs anonymes. They reunited for Nos enfants chéris (Our Precious Children), in which he played Martin, a 30-year-old who meets his great love again just as he's about to become a father.

In 2001, Demy received the best actor award at the Festival de Paris for Quand on sera grand directed by Renaud Cohen. The Festival Européen Cinessone awarded him twice for acting: in 2003 for Mister V. by Émilie Deleuze and in 2004 for Le Silence by Orso Miret.

In 2005, Les Films de l’Autre produced Demy's second short film, La Bourde (20’), an experimental comedy.

Demy reprised his role as Martin for the TV adaptation of Nos enfants chéris, which aired on Canal+ in 2007–2008. He was cast by Pascal Bonitzer for Le Grand Alibi and worked twice for Philippe Barassat, in Folle de Rachid en transit sur Mars and in Lisa et le pilote d’avion. In 2009, he also starred in André Téchiné's La Fille du RER and in the television drama Mes chères études, directed by Emmanuelle Bercot and dealing with a students' prostitution.

In 2011, Demy appeared in Céline Sciamma's Tomboy and was cast as the lead in the romantic comedy L'Art de séduire by Guy Mazarguil.

The same year, Demy wrote, directed and produced his first feature film, Americano. Demy also stars in the film along with Salma Hayek and Geraldine Chaplin.

Since 2012 Demy has continued to act in films such as Les Conquerants by Xabi Molia or My LIttle One by Frédéric Choffat and Julie Gilbert. Demy has also been involved in French television shows such as Eric Rochant's multi-awarded Le Bureau des Légendes for which he directed two episodes in season 1 and 3 episodes in season 3. Demy also had a part in the show as Clément Migaud, Marie-Jeanne's lover.

In 2019 Demy starred in Mytho along with Marina Hands. The show was created by Anne Berest and Fabrice Gobert ("Les revenants") and was broadcast on Arte, where it gathered 2 million views, and available on Netflix for the international audience. The shooting of season 2 was interrupted by COVID-19 and completed in the fall of 2020.

In 2021-2022 Demy worked on Julie Delpy's Netflix TV show On the Verge. He directed four of the twelve episodes and plays Delpy's narcissistic husband.

Working mostly in Europe since 2022, Demy acted in All to Play For by Delphine Deoget and Club Zero by Jessica Hausner. Both films were selected in the 2023 Cannes film Festival, respectively in the Un Certain Regard selection and the Official competition.

== Filmography ==
- 1977: One Sings, the Other Doesn't
- 1981: Documenteur
- 1988: Kung-Fu Master
- 1993: Under the Stars with Julie Gayet, Chiara Mastroianni
- 1995: A Hundred and One Nights
- 1997: Arlette with Josiane Balasko and Christopher Lambert
- 1997: Jeanne et le garçon formidable with Virginie Ledoyen
- 1999: Le New Yorker with Grace Phillips
- 1999: Banqueroute with Antoine Chappey
- 2000: La Chambre obscure with Caroline Ducey, Melvil Poupaud
- 2001: Dieu est grand, je suis toute petite with Audrey Tautou
- 2002: Aram by Robert Kechichian with Simon Abkarian, Lubna Azabal
- 2003: Nos enfants chéris by Benoît Cohen
- 2005: The Art of Breaking Up by Michel Deville with Emmanuelle Béart, Charles Berling
- 2006: Quelques jours en septembre by Santiago Amigorena
- 2007: Écoute le temps by Alantė Kavaitė
- 2007: Le Temps d'un regard by Ilan Flammer
- 2008: Le Grand alibi by Pascal Bonitzer
- 2008: Les Plages d'Agnès by Agnès Varda
- 2009: La Fille du RER by André Téchiné
- 2011: Les Insomniaques by Jean-Pierre Mocky
- 2011: L'Art de séduire by Guy Mazarguil
- 2011: Tomboy by Céline Sciamma
- 2011: Americano, directorial debut
- 2013: The Conquerors by Xabi Molia
- 2015: Séances by Guy Maddin
- 2016–2018: Le Bureau des Légendes by Eric Rochant
- 2018: My Little One by Julie Gilbert & Frédéric Choffat
- 2019–2020: Mytho by Fabrice Gobert & Anne Berest
- 2021: On the Verge by Julie Delpy
- 2022: Oussekine by Antoine Chevrollier
- 2023: All to Play For by Delphine Deoget
- 2023: Club Zero by Jessica Hausner
- 2024: Block Pass (La Pampa) by Antoine Chevrollier
