= La Memoria De Nuestra Tierra (Calif. 1996) =

Mural in Los Angeles, California, United States

La Memoria De Nuestra Tierra: California 1996 is a 10 ft x 30 ft rectangular mural, currently located in the University of Southern California's Graduate Student Lounge within the Ronald Tutor Campus Center. The mural was painted by artist Judy Baca in collaboration with students from the University's Roski School of Art and Design. This piece shows the Chicano history of Southern California through the depiction of various images inspired by the native history of the land and the more modern conflicts and issues Latinos have suffered.

== History ==
La Memoria de Nuestra Tierra was commissioned by the University in July 1995 and dedicated on December 5, 1996.

The creation of the mural was sparked by a number of concerns and demands made by Latino and Chicano students during the 1993-1994 academic year. The University received 45 different submissions before choosing Baca, who was widely known for the creation of “The Great Wall of Los Angeles.” The mural was installed in USC's Student Center in August 1996.

Baca's mural was then rededicated on Sept. 30, 2010 at the grand opening of the Ronald Tutor Campus Center.

La Memoria de Nuestra Tierra translates to English as The Memory of Our Land. As its name suggests, the piece was created to celebrate Latino and, more specifically, Chicano culture and influence at The University of Southern California and in Los Angeles. The mural depicts central aspects of Mexican culture and religion, such as the Kiva, as well as instances and actors that played key roles in the interconnection between Mexican and American culture, such as the conquistadors and the U.S.-Mexico border.

Baca also created a mural under the same name that is currently on display at Denver International Airport. This mural, however, is more personal, depicting her grandparents journey from Mexico to Colorado.

== Important elements ==
=== Kiva ===
The Kiva, a Native American ceremonial structure, is the central image of the Mural. This represents the native, religious and nurturing characteristics of Latino and Chicano culture. Based on this idea of the caring nature of the culture, the river flows from the kiva and onto the land, eventually turning into a paved road on the U.S side of the border, signaling the difference in culture. Corn also grows around the structure of the Kiva, supporting the idea of the Kiva as a provider of nutritional, religious and cultural nourishment for the community.

Kivas, which can be built above or below ground, were used for both religious and day-to-day domestic activities depending on the community that was utilizing them. Smaller Kivas often served as single-person homes, while those that were solely used for ritual purposes tended to be larger than multi-use structures.

=== Conquistadors ===
At the center-right of the mural, on the Mexican side of the land, there is an illustration of a conquistador's head. The image of the conquistador has a helmet painted near the workers and activists that are depicted on the right edge of the mural. The conquistador is depicted as an illustration because there was a time during colonization when all people spoke different languages, making illustrations the chosen mode of communication over verbal communication.

The Conquistadors are major players in Latino history, making the way that the conquistador is depicted in Baca's work very important in understanding the Latino/Chicano experience. As mentioned above, the conquistador is "stamped" near the workers and the man running at the border, which is supposed to show these men's ever-present nature on this land and their need to claim control over it and the native people because they had different cultures and practices that were misunderstood as that of “savages.”

=== U.S.-Mexico border ===
The U.S-Mexico border is clearly marked in the mural by a flowing river turning into a paved road, as previously mentioned, and it is easy to see the contrast of the two lands because the Mexican side is untouched or underdeveloped, while the U.S side shows development, crops, and greenery.

The larger meaning behind this mural is a sort of celebration of the importance of the land. On the far right of the mural we see a sleeping woman that wakes up displeased to realize that the border has become a part of her. Also on the far right, at the front of the line of workers, there is a man wearing a hoodie who is running from immigration officers.

All of these elements depict the history of the U.S.-Mexico border and the culture of migration across it. Mexican migrants and workers are often synonyms of criminality for border agents even though most people cross the border for economic and social reasons, searching for a better life in a land that once was their own, while still maintaining a strong connection to their homeland.

=== Chicano activists ===
In the lower right corner of the mural, Baca depicts many artists and activists among the Chicano community. These activists include David Alfaro Siqueiros, Frida Kahlo, Diego Rivera, the United Farm Workers, and the Chicano Moratorium.

David Alfaro Siqueiros (1896–1974) was a Mexican artist and activist. Siqueiros painted many murals and helped begin the mural movement in Mexico. He engaged in political activism through his art as well as in his day-to-day life, particularly democracy and workers’ rights.

Frida Kahlo (1907–1954) was a Mexican artist and activist. Kahlo stood up for many social justice issues both physically and through her art. Her art includes messages of Mexican nationalism, Marxism, and feminism. She also protested US intervention in Latin America.

Diego Rivera (1886–1957) was a Mexican artist and activist. His art is very political, and through it he has supported the Mexican Revolution and the socialist revolution while condemning colonialism, capitalism, and imperialism.

Cesar Chavez (1927–1993) and the United Farm Workers were Mexican-American activists who protested farm workers’ treatments and advocated for their rights.

The Chicano Moratorium was an anti-Vietnam War protest that occurred in Los Angeles, California on August 29, 1970. The demonstration included approximately 30,000 Mexican-American activists.

=== Los ranchos ===
On the upper part of the mural, Baca paints the los ranchos. The ranchos were occupied by Mexican settlers before the 1870s. Some ranchos Baca depicts are Rancho La Cienega, Palos Verdes, Los Verdugos, Santiago de Santa Ana, La Ballona and San Fernando. This land is typically viewed as a symbol of Hispanic California. The ranchos are often romanticized and viewed with a sense of nostalgia by many Hispanics. The land is reminiscent of a time before European-American settlers occupied and colonized the territory.

=== Sonora Town ===
The left portion of the mural features the image of the deteriorating houses which represent Sonora Town. Sonora Town is referred to as Los Angeles’ first predominately Spanish-speaking neighborhood, or barrio, and has seen a variety of changing populations throughout the course of history. All of Sonora Town's inhabits have faced various social and economic issues that plagued the barrio. Following its initial development in 1899, the people of Sonora Town suffered extreme poverty, crime, and hazardous environments while receiving little aid or recognition from the government. The decrepit houses of Sonora Town illustrated in Baca's mural call attention to the state of California's neglect of this population of Spanish-speaking individuals.

=== Silver Dollar Bar ===
In the mural, an image of a soldier is located along the illustration of a river. The soldier is labeled with the title “The Silver Dollar”, referencing the Silver Dollar Bar, which played a significant role in sparking the Chicano Movement of the 1970s. The Silver Dollar Bar marks the location when Chicano activist and journalist Ruben Salazar was murdered in an act of police brutality. The death of Salazar marked the official beginning of the Chicano Movement in Los Angeles and inspired Mexican Americans to actively protest violent police behavior. Baca's reference to the Silver Dollar Bar in the mural recognizes the history of police brutality against Mexican Americans and pays homage to the efforts of Chicano protestors who advocated for a safer and more just future.

=== Santa Barbara missions ===
Two Chumash people are illustrated in the lower left corner of Baca's mural. These individuals represent the near extinction of a native people due to the intervention of colonists. The Chumash were native individuals of the California coast whose population and culture were greatly disturbed by European intervention and colonization. With the Santa Barbara missions came oppression, murder, and unbearable living conditions. These conditions allowed for the vast spread of disease, including dysentery syphilis, which drastically increased mortality rates and led to over a 50% decrease in the Chumash population. Baca symbolizes this widespread genocide with the depiction of Chumash corpus in the lower left of the mural.
