= Americano (2011 film) =

- Promotional poster
- Directed by: Mathieu Demy
- Written by: Mathieu Demy
- Produced by: Mathieu Demy; Agnès Varda; Lisa Blok-Linson; Luisa Gomez da Silva; Corina Danckwerts; Johanna Colboc; Angeline Massoni
- Starring: Mathieu Demy; Salma Hayek; Geraldine Chaplin; Chiara Mastroianni; Carlos Bardem; Jean-Pierre Mocky
- Cinematography: Georges Lechaptois
- Edited by: Jean-Baptiste Morin
- Music by: Georges Delerue; Grégoire Hetzel
- Distributed by: Les Films du Losange
- Release date: 8 September 2011 (Toronto)
- Running time: 90 minutes
- Country: France
- Languages: French; English; Spanish
- Box office: $204,165

Americano is a 2011 French drama film written and directed by Mathieu Demy. Demy also stars alongside Geraldine Chaplin, Salma Hayek and Chiara Mastroianni. Demy's mother, Agnès Varda, who was also a filmmaker, served as a producer on the project. The film received its première at the 2011 Toronto International Film Festival on 8 September 2011 and later that month, was also screened at the San Sebastián International Film Festival, where it competed for the Kutxa-New Directors Award. In October it was played at the 55th BFI London Film Festival.

== Plot ==
In Paris, the relationship between Martin (Demy) and Claire (Mastroianni) is at an impasse. His mother's death suddenly calls Martin back to Los Angeles, the town where he spent his childhood, to deal with inheritance formalities. In Los Angeles he is helped by a family friend, Linda, who takes him to his mother's home and the neighbourhood he grew up in. This return to childhood haunts provokes several buried memories that appear to disturb Martin. After speaking with a neighbour, Martin goes to Tijuana in Mexico, looking for Lola (Hayek), a close friend of his mother's. He tracks her down to the Americano, a club where Lola works as a dancer. However, to find resolution, Martin must face up to his past.

== Cast ==
- Mathieu Demy as Martin
- Salma Hayek as Lola
- Geraldine Chaplin as Linda
- Chiara Mastroianni as Claire
- Carlos Bardem as Luis
- Jean-Pierre Mocky as Father
- André Wilms as L'Allemand

== Reception ==
Americano received an average rating of 3.2 out of 5 stars on the French website AlloCiné, based on 23 reviews. On Rotten Tomatoes, the film holds an approval rating of 50% based on 16 reviews, with an average rating of 5.5/10. On Metacritic, the film has a weighted average score of 50 out of 100, based on 8 critic reviews, indicating "mixed or average reviews".

== Notes ==
The memory scenes of Martin's childhood in Los Angeles are derived from Demy's mother, Agnès Varda's 1981 film Documenteur, in which Demy appeared as a child.
