= Sarah Jones (stage actress) =

American playwright, actress, film director, and podcast host

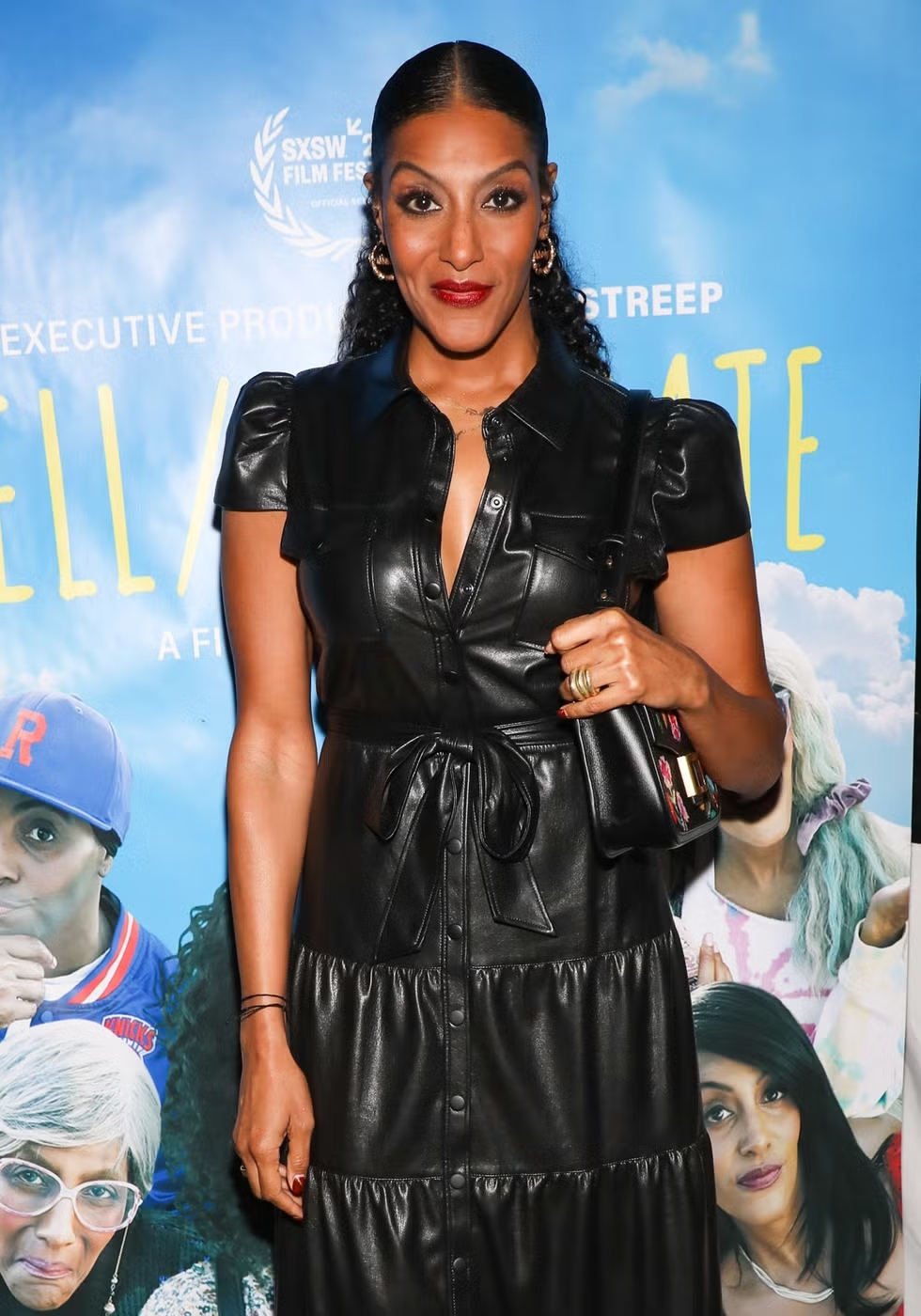
- Jones at the premiere of Sell/Buy/Date (2022)
- Born: Baltimore, Maryland, U.S.
- Occupations: Playwright; actress; film director; podcast host
- Years active: 2000–present
- Notable work: Bridge & Tunnel, Sell/Buy/Date, America, Who Hurt You?
- Website: SarahJonesOnline.com

Sarah Jones is an American playwright, actress, film director, and podcast host. She is best known for her multi-character solo performances and her Tony Award-winning Broadway show Bridge & Tunnel (2006), which was produced by Meryl Streep. She is also the writer, director, and star of the 2022 hybrid documentary film Sell/Buy/Date, based on her critically acclaimed play of the same name.

== Career ==
In 2024, Jones launched America, Who Hurt You? (AWHY), a podcast and live performance series exploring American identity through interviews and original character monologues. Produced by her company Foment Productions, the series continues Jones's commitment to socially engaged storytelling and has featured guests such as Krista Tippett, Laverne Cox, and Jane Fonda. The stage adaptation — a one-woman, one-act play in which Jones plays 19 different characters in 100 minutes — is scheduled to run off-Broadway until October 4, 2026, followed by performances at the Under the Radar Festival in January 2027.

In 2022, Jones directed, wrote, produced, and starred in Sell/Buy/Date, a hybrid documentary-comedy film that premiered at South by Southwest and was released theatrically and on Amazon Prime.

Jones rose to prominence with Bridge & Tunnel, in which she portrayed more than a dozen characters from immigrant and working-class communities. The show earned her a Special Tony Award and was praised for its emotional depth and social commentary.

Her earlier shows include Surface Transit (1998), commissioned works such as Women Can't Wait! for Equality Now, and Waking the American Dream for the National Immigration Forum. These led to the creation of Bridge & Tunnel, which broke box office records Off-Broadway.

In 2001, Jones's recording of the poem "Your Revolution" was censored by the FCC for alleged indecency. With support from the ACLU, she successfully sued the agency, becoming the first artist in U.S. history to win a censorship case against the FCC.

She also created A Right to Care (2005), commissioned by the W.K. Kellogg Foundation to address racial health disparities. Her performances have taken place at the White House, World Economic Forum, and other global venues. She has delivered four popular TED Talks and served as a UNICEF Goodwill Ambassador.

== Advocacy and affiliations ==
Jones is the founder of Foment Productions, a media company focused on narrative justice and community healing. She has collaborated with organizations including the Center for Reproductive Rights, Democracy Now!, A Call To Men, and The Meteor.

== Life ==
Jones was born in Baltimore, Maryland, to an African American father and a mother of mixed Euro-American and Caribbean descent. She was raised in Boston, Washington, D.C., and Queens, New York. Her multicultural background has heavily influenced her creative work. She resides in Los Angeles.

== Selected works ==
=== Theater ===
- Surface Transit
- Bridge & Tunnel (2006)
- Sell/Buy/Date (play)
- America, Who Hurt You? (2026)

=== Film ===
- Sell/Buy/Date (2022) – writer, director, star

=== Television ===
- On the Verge (TV series) (2021)

=== Podcast and Public Media ===
- America, Who Hurt You? (2024–present)

== Awards ==
- Tony Award for Best Special Theatrical Event – Bridge & Tunnel (2006)
- Obie Award – for writing and performance
