= Murals of Los Angeles =

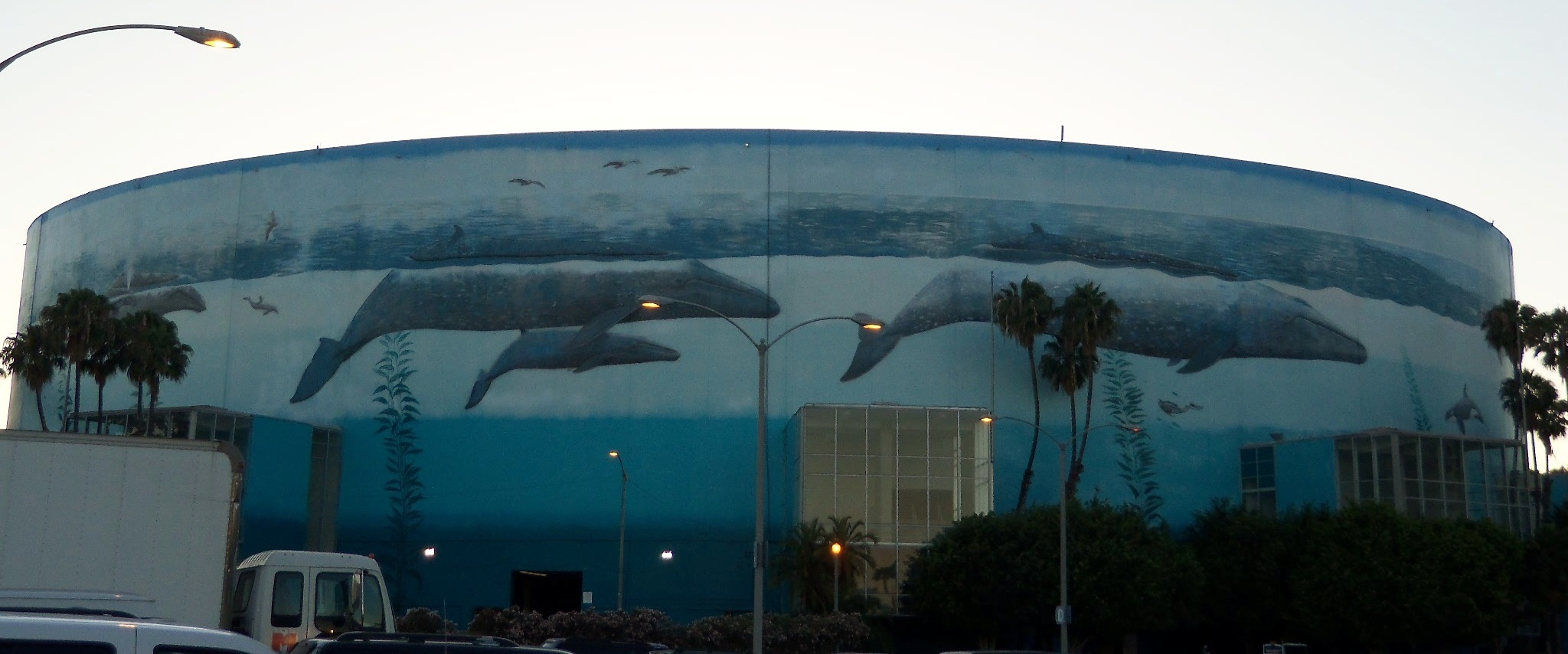
Muralist Robert Wyland's whaling wall Ocean Planet (1992) appears on the Long Beach Convention and Entertainment Center, which also includes a three acre rooftop mural of planet Earth.

Greater Los Angeles, California, is home to thousands of murals, earning it the nickname "the mural capital of the world" or "the mural capital of America." (Note: The moniker has also been used to describe Philadelphia, Pennsylvania, another American city with a significant collection of murals.) The city's mural culture began and proliferated throughout the 20th century. Murals in Los Angeles often reflect the social and political movements of their time and highlight cultural symbols representative of Southern California. In particular, murals in Los Angeles have been influenced by the Chicano art movement and the culture of Los Angeles. Murals are considered a distinctive form of public art in Los Angeles, often associated with street art, billboards, and contemporary graffiti.

From 2002 to 2013, Los Angeles had a moratorium on the creation of new murals in the city, stemming from legal conflicts regarding large-scale commercial out-of-home advertising, primarily billboards. The ban was lifted with the passing of LA Ordinance No. 182706, known as the mural ordinance. Mural registration is administered through the City of Los Angeles Department of Cultural Affairs. Because of the large number of murals throughout the city, numerous programs exist for their preservation and documentation, including the Mural Conservancy of Los Angeles, the Getty Conservation Institute, and others.

== History ==
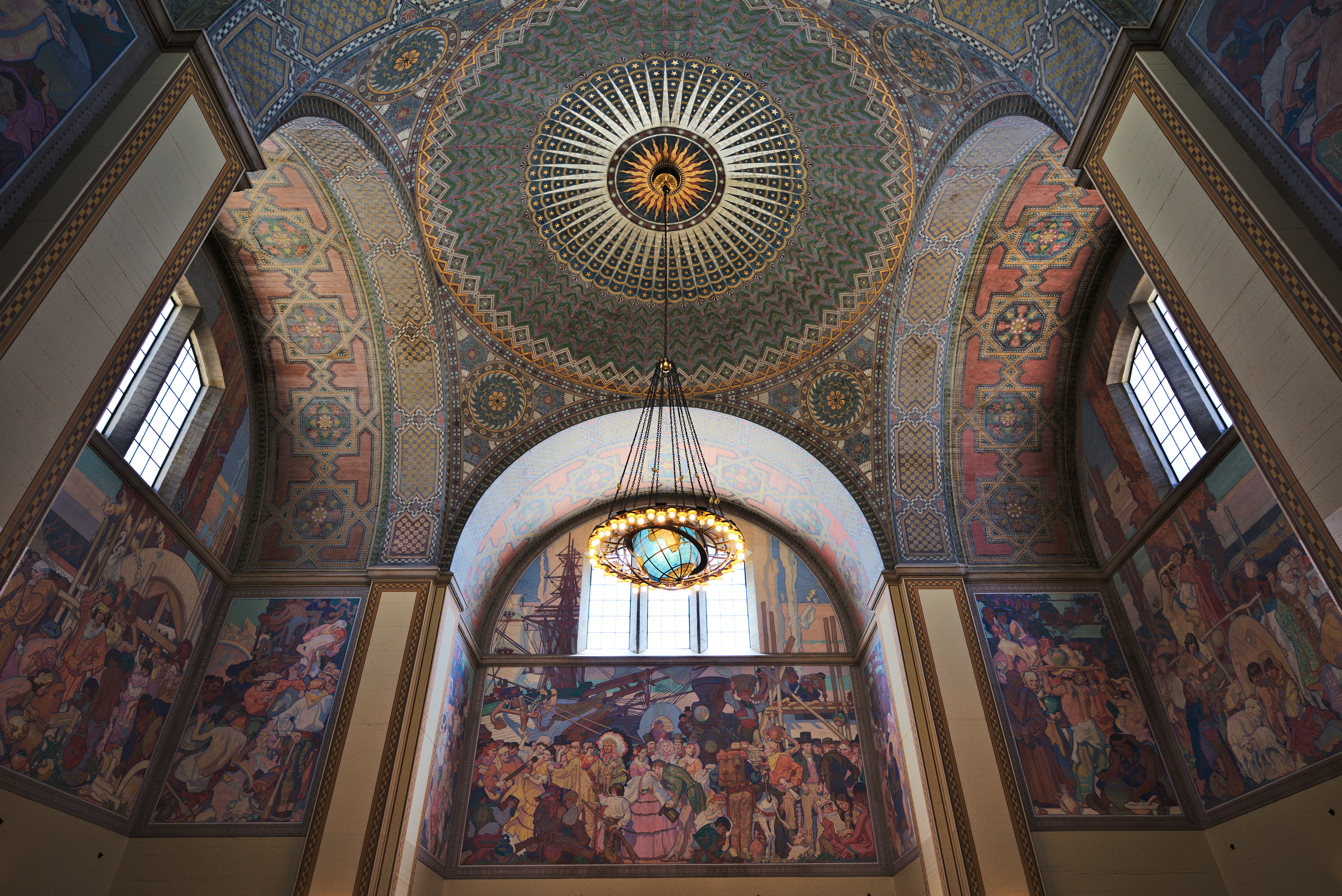
Murals by Dean Cornwell in the Grand Rotunda of the Los Angeles Central Library depicting California history (1933)

Many of the city's oldest murals have been lost, usually from weathering or the process of urban development. Among the earliest known murals from Los Angeles were featured in the central business district, including those of Einar Petersen in 1912 and a ceramic tile panel for a cafeteria, created in 1913.

=== The New Deal ===
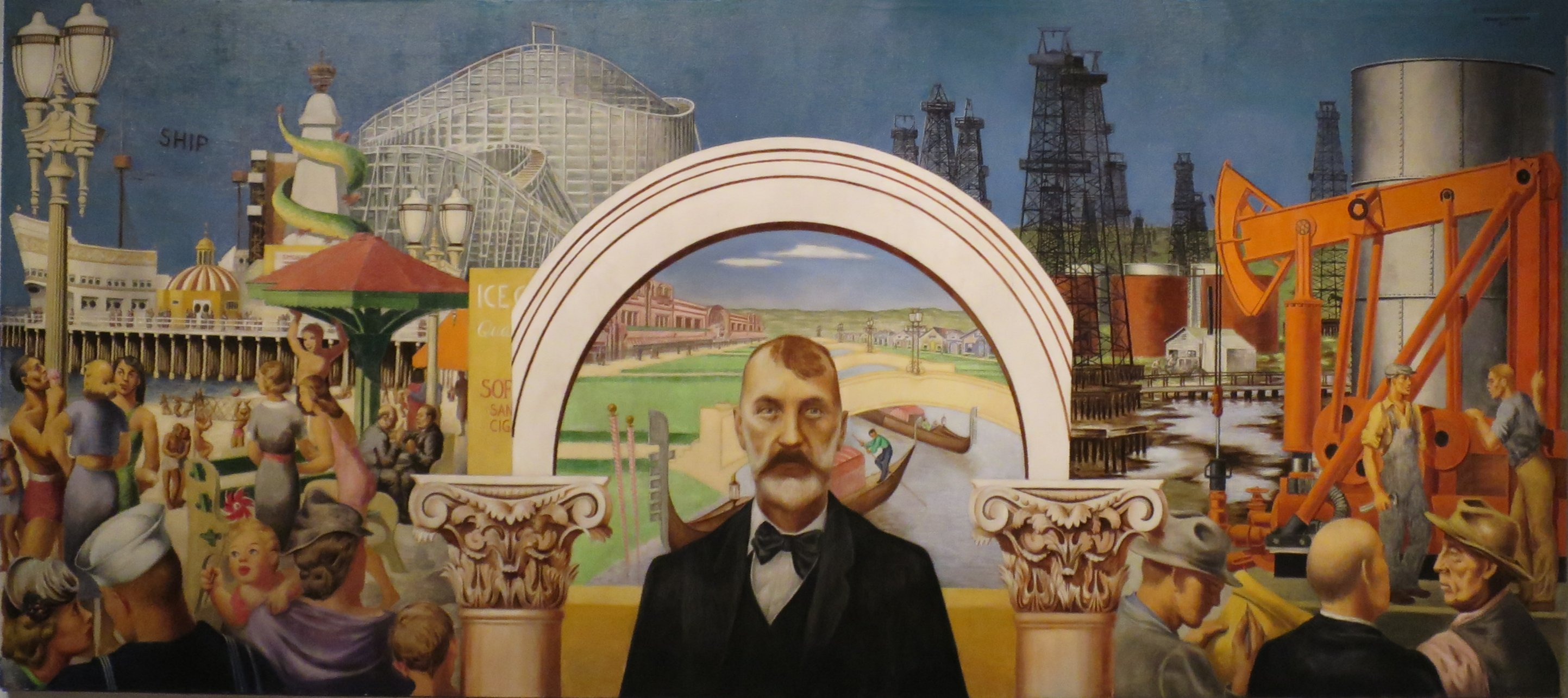
Abbot Kinney and the Story of Venice (1941) by Edward Biberman, originally commissioned for a post office in Venice, Los Angeles, depicts developer Abbot Kinney and scenes from the history of Venice, including the Venice of America canal district and the Venice oil boom.

In the early 1930s, most prominent Los Angeles murals were on commercial rather than civic buildings. Notable exceptions to this trend include the political works of muralists David Alfaro Siqueiros and Myer Shaffer, often supported by artistic and cultural institutions in the city.

Between 1933 and 1943, the United States government, as part of the New Deal, funded "federal art projects", a series of murals, paintings, and sculptures in and around public institutions. These funds supported the creation of hundreds of murals around Los Angeles. Many of the resultant works feature rural landscapes, scenes from regional history, and portrayals of immigration, especially influenced by Mexican muralism after the Mexican Revolution (1910-1920). Certain murals funded by the project were subsequently painted over, often because of their political overtones. For example, Myer Shaffer's The Social Aspects of Tuberculosis (1936) at the Los Angeles Tuberculosis Sanitarium, originally supported by the Federal Art Project, was covered completely by 1938 because of its Communist themes. Shaffer went on to document the growing number of murals blanketed by local authorities in the Jewish Community Press.

=== 2002 mural moratorium ===
Through the 1980s, commercial advertising on signage and billboards in Los Angeles was regulated by multiple government institutions, including the California Department of Transportation (Caltrans), often without clear distinctions between murals and other types of signs. Numerous efforts to ban billboards in the city had been proposed and in 1984 Los Angeles City Council passed a law preventing the development of billboards within 600 feet of each other. Some advertisers sought to present commercials works as murals, in order to take advantage of a rule exempting murals from restrictions on sign posting. In the 1990s, the Los Angeles city council faced lawsuits from advertisers, based on the claim that restrictions on commercial speech were an unfair exception to the First Amendment.

In 1999, the Los Angeles Department of Cultural Affairs was in the process of developing guidelines for the regulation of supergraphic signage, including advertising billboards. In June of the same year, Jackie Goldberg, city councilmember for Los Angeles City Council District 13, filed a motion to temporarily halt the placement of new billboards after an influx of new signs were erected to pre-empt forthcoming regulations. An interim control ordinance (ICO 173562) prohibiting the issuance of building permits for any off-site signs was passed to combat the accelerated pace of sign development in Hollywood, signed in 2000 by Los Angeles mayor Richard Riordan. An extension to ICO 173562 was instituted in 2001, initially presented by city councilmember Eric Garcetti, also of the 13th district.

In April 2002, LA Ordinance No. 174547 was passed, banning new "off-site signs" across the city.

"(I) Off-site signs. No off-site sign shall be allowed in any zone, except when off-site signs are specifically permitted pursuant to a legally adopted specific plan, supplemental use district or an approved development agreement. Further, that legally permitted existing signs shall not be altered or enlarged."

— LA Ordinance No. 174547

The definition of an off-site sign structure had recently been added to the municipal code after the implementation of a periodic sign inspection program. (Note: Off-Site Sign Structure. A structure of any kind or character, erected, used or maintained for an off-site sign or signs, upon which any poster, bill, printing, painting, projected image or other advertisement may be placed. — LA Ordinance No. 174736 (2002)) Later, in May 2002, City Council adopted LA Ordinance No. 174552, approved by mayor James Hahn, creating the supplemental use district designation "SN" for sign districts. The establishment of sign districts would allow certain districts to have more flexible regulations regarding sign posting, with the intent of minimizing public advertising, the expansion of which being seen as a blight on the city. A March 2003 amendment to the municipal code updated the definition of an off-site sign to:

Off-Site Sign. A sign which displays any message directing attention to a business, product, service, profession, commodity, activity, event, person, institution or any other commercial message, which is generally conducted, sold, manufactured, produced, offered or occurs elsewhere than on the premises where the sign is located.

— LA Ordinance No. 175151 (2003)

Previously, in autumn 2002, three advertising companies had filed a lawsuit against the city of Los Angeles on the grounds that the restrictions on off-site signs limited their freedom of expression. The companies were initially granted a preliminary injunction against the city, although it was vacated shortly thereafter by the Ninth Circuit Court of Appeals, in part based on the subsequent 2003 amendment.

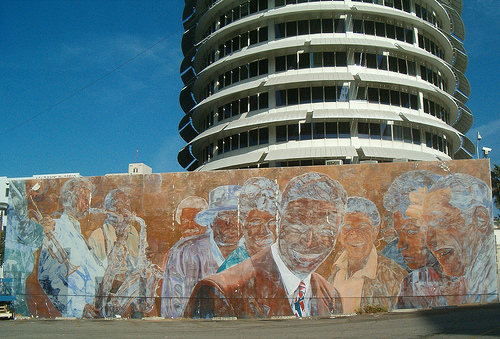

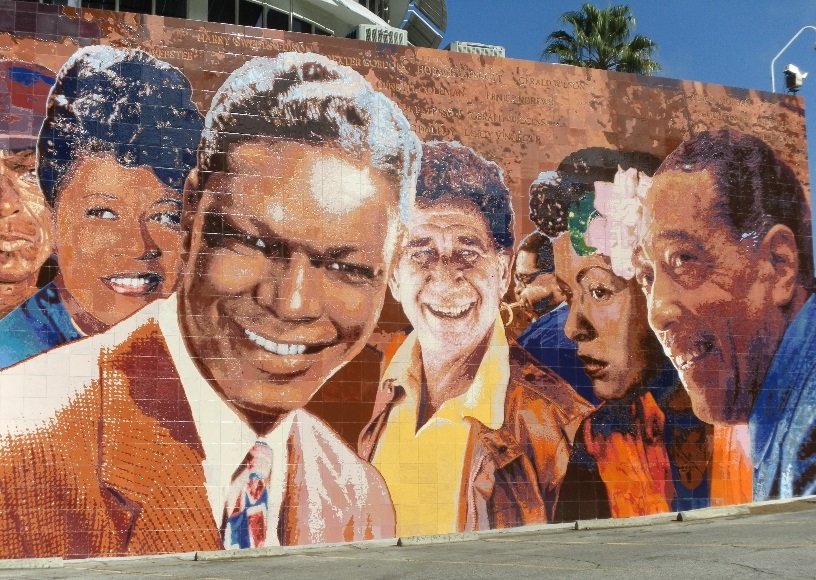
Hollywood Jazz — 1945-1972 (1990), a tile mural by Richard Wyatt Jr. at Capitol Records depicting significant jazz musicians, was restored in 2013.

In 2013, City Council and mayor Eric Garcetti passed LA Ordinance No. 182706, amending the city municipal code to allow for the creation and preservation of existing and new non-commercial murals. LA Ordinance No. 182825 the same year amended the Los Angeles administrative code, maintaining the general prohibition of murals on single family residences and accessory structures but excepting residences in city council districts 1, 9, and 14. In 2017, Ordinance No. 185059 extended the exemption to Los Angeles City Council District 15 after being proposed by councilmember Joe Buscaino.

El Monte city council instituted a similar ban in the adjacent city in 1977. The ban was later lifted and numerous mural projects have since been organized in the city.

== Major themes ==
=== Chicano art movement ===
Since the original settlement of Los Angeles by the pobladores from New Spain (modern Mexico), the art and culture of the city have been heavily influenced by that of Mexico. Multiple major waves of immigration have brought migrants to the region, including the Mexican–American War (1846-1848), the California Gold Rush (1848-1855), and the growth of agriculture in California in the early 20th century. Some of the earliest known murals in Los Angeles come from Mexican refugees, including David Alfaro Siqueiros, known as one of the "Big Three" of Mexican muralism. (Note: Along with José Clemente Orozco and Diego Rivera.) Siqueiros's fresco mural América Tropical (1932), at El Pueblo de Los Ángeles Historical Monument, is the only of his American murals found in its original location, although it was once painted over due to its controversial anti-imperialist message.

The Chicano movement and California labor movement, especially in the 1960s, were sources of inspiration for many murals in the region. Labor leaders Cesar Chavez and Dolores Huerta often appear prominently in murals, as does the Aztec eagle, a symbol featured in the logo of the United Farm Workers, an agricultural labor union. Religious identity, predominantly Catholicism, has also been a major theme. In the second half of the century, the Chicano street art movement spread throughout barrios and other neighborhoods in East Los Angeles.

In 1974, muralist and activist Judy Baca organized a citywide mural program in Los Angeles. The program resulted in the production of hundreds of murals across the city, including Baca's Great Wall of Los Angeles (1978) along the Tujunga Wash. (Note: Baca left her role in the Citywide Mural Project in 1977, concurrent with the beginning of her work on the Great Wall of Los Angeles.) In 1976, with painter Christina Schlesinger and filmmaker Donna Deitch, Baca founded the Social and Public Art Resource Center, a community art center that sponsors the development and restoration of murals throughout the city.

=== Sports and athletics ===
Many Los Angeles sports icons and teams are commemorated in murals, especially near their respective stadiums. Roadside murals have been commissioned for the Los Angeles Marathon multiple times, dating back to the original race in 1986. Other major sports events represented in murals include the 1994 FIFA World Cup, the Los Angeles Rams' 2022 victory in Super Bowl LVI at SoFi Stadium, the Los Angeles Lakers' multiple NBA championships, the Los Angeles Dodgers' 2020 World Series win, the Los Angeles Kings' two Stanley Cup wins in 2012 and 2014, and the MLS Cups of the LA Galaxy. A number of murals also exist honoring significant Los Angeles baseball players, such as Jackie Robinson, (Note: Robinson played for the Brooklyn Dodgers, before their 1957 move to Los Angeles. However, he spent most of his childhood in Pasadena and played varsity sports (baseball, basketball, football, and track) for UCLA, leading him to still be seen as a sports icon for Los Angeles.) Sandy Koufax, Fernando Valenzuela, and others.

==== Olympics ====
Los Angeles has hosted the Summer Olympics twice, in 1932 and 1984. (Note: The 2028 Summer Olympics are also slated to be held in Los Angeles.) Prior to the 1932 Summer Olympics, Los Angeles Times art critic Arthur Millier recommended taking visiting attendees on a tour of the city's murals. For the 1984 Summer Olympics, a series of ten murals were painted along the 110 and 101 freeways as part of the Olympic Arts Festival. Beginning in 2007 after years of disrepair and tagging, Caltrans "hibernated" the murals, applying a coating and layer of gray paint to be removed later for restoration. Efforts to restore many of the Olympic Festival freeway murals began in commemoration of the 30th anniversary of the Games.

==== Kobe Bryant ====
Kobe Bryant was a highly-decorated basketball player for the Los Angeles Lakers, winning five championships with the team. Throughout his career, murals were created acknowledging his accomplishments, including his career-high 81 point game in 2006 and retirement in 2016. Following his 2020 death in a helicopter crash, many tributes to Bryant were created around the city, frequently featuring his daughter Gianna, who was also killed in the crash. The prominence of these murals has led to their becoming a notable tourist attraction, resulting in maps and city guides documenting the collection of Kobe artwork.

== In media ==
The documentary film Mur Murs (1981) by French filmmaker Agnès Varda explores murals across the city and shares imagery of Los Angeles murals with Varda's feature film from the same year, Documenteur. The documentary Exit Through the Gift Shop (2010) directed by street artist Banksy tells the story of Thierry Guetta, a French street artist in Los Angeles.

== See also ==
- List of public art in Los Angeles
- Luminaries of Pantheism
- Las Mujeres Muralistas, a Latina artist collective based in San Francisco
- Murals of P-22, a wild mountain lion that lived in the city
