= Valley Glen, Los Angeles =

Valley Glen
- Neighborhood of Los Angeles
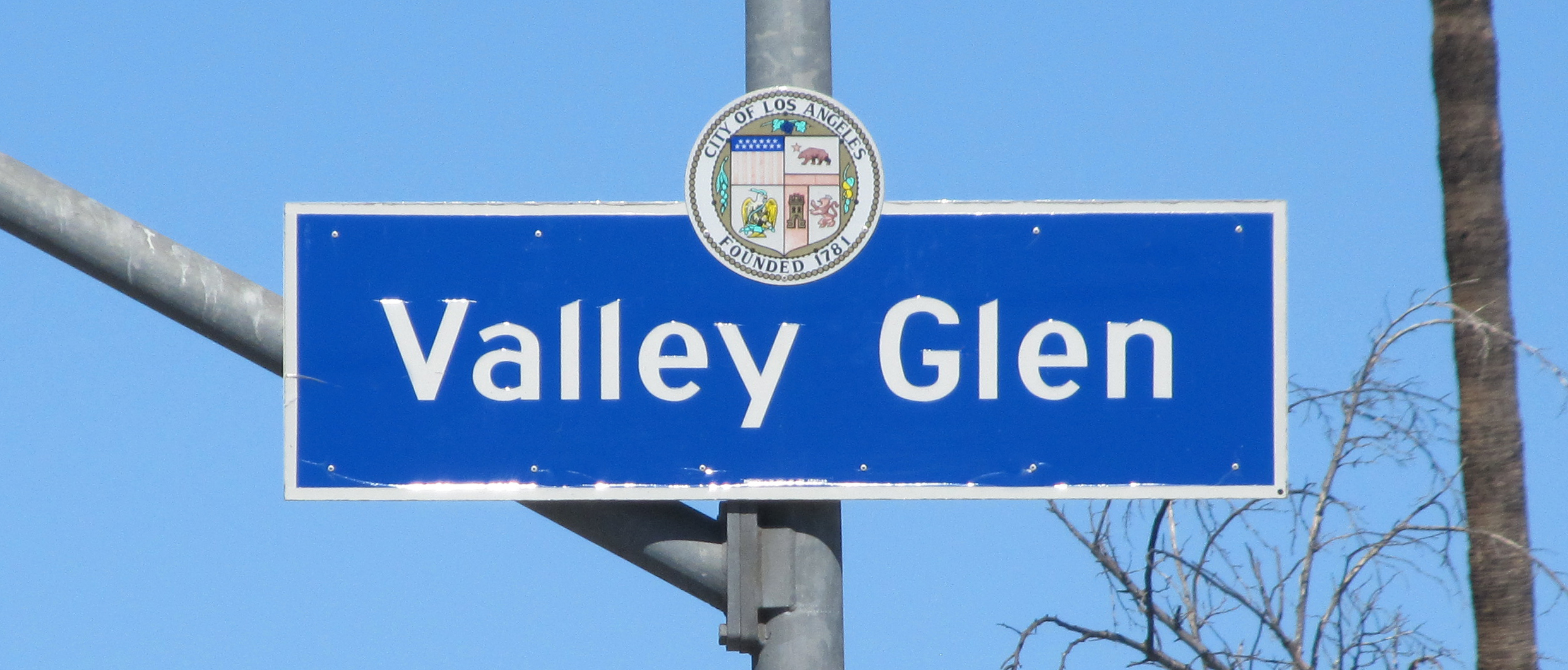
- Valley Glen neighborhood sign located at the intersection of Burbank Boulevard and Fulton Avenue

- Location within Los Angeles
- Coordinates: 34.16488°N 118.3965°W
- Country: United States of America
- State: California
- County: Los Angeles
- Time zone: Pacific Greater Valley Glen Council Contact 13654 Victory Blvd, #136 Valley Glen CA 91401
- Zip Code: 91606
- Area codes: 747, 818
- Website: greatervalleyglencouncil.org

Valley Glen is a neighborhood in the southeastern section of the San Fernando Valley in Los Angeles, California. Once part of Van Nuys and North Hollywood, it became a separate neighborhood in 1998. Valley Glen is home to Los Angeles Valley College and the Great Wall of Los Angeles, a half-mile-long California-history mural listed on the National Register of Historic Places.

== History ==
Prior to 1998, Valley Glen was part of Van Nuys and North Hollywood. In 1997, more than 70% of the area's homeowners signed a petition to change the name of a section of Van Nuys (between Burbank and Victory boulevards) to Valley Glen. The proposed Valley Glen neighborhood would encompass 1,200 homes.

In February 1998, some adjacent neighborhoods joined Valley Glen and City Councilman Mike Feuer endorsed the name change. Valley Glen became an official Los Angeles neighborhood in June 1998. The new neighborhood encompassed more than 3,000 homes between Hazeltine and Whitsett Avenues.

In 1998, the Department of Transportation installed 12 neighborhood signs. In 2004, CalTrans agreed to erect a sign on the Hollywood (170) Freeway identifying the location of Valley Glen. In 2008, the US Postal Service officially recognized the neighborhood by designating all or part of 91401 (Van Nuys), 91405 (Van Nuys) and 91606 (North Hollywood) to be Valley Glen. In 2013, the city approved the installation of a monument sign proposed by the Greater Valley Glen Council. It is located at the intersection of Burbank Boulevard and Coldwater Canyon Avenue.

== Geography ==
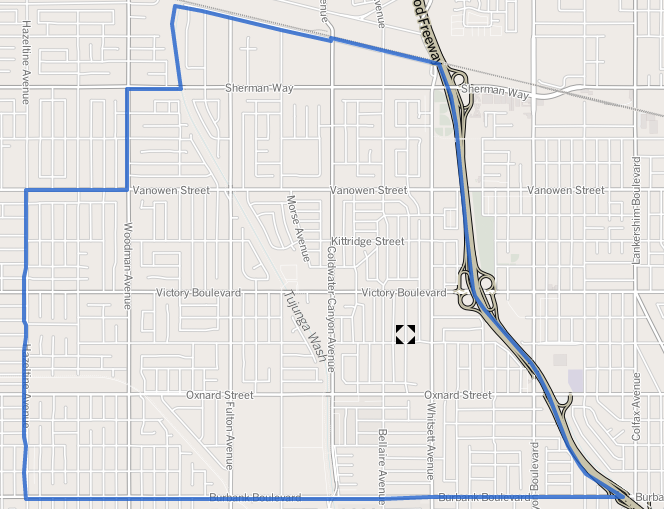
Valley Glen map from the Los Angeles Times

In the "Mapping L.A." geographical section of the Los Angeles Times website, the 4.81 square miles of Valley Glen are bounded on the north by Raymer Street, Sherman Way or Vanowen Street, on the west by the Tujunga Wash, Woodman Avenue or Hazeltine Avenue, on the south by Burbank Boulevard and on the east by the Hollywood Freeway. In most of its area it is bisected by the Tujunga Wash, which runs north to south.

== Population ==
In 2000, Valley Glen had a population of 59,230, according to the U.S. Census, and by 2008 its population was 62,846, according to the Los Angeles Department of City Planning.

Ethnically, Valley Glen is "highly diverse," with Latinos at 45.2%, whites at 39.5%, Asians at 5.4%, blacks at 3.9% and others at 6%. It is also high within the city for the percentage of foreign born (49%), with Mexico (26.9%) and Armenia (14.4%) being the most common foreign places of birth. In other respects — population density, income, university education, age, homeowners, military service, it is "about average" for the city of Los Angeles. Twenty-one percent of Valley Glen residents aged 25 and older had earned a four-year degree by 2000, an average figure for both the city and the county.

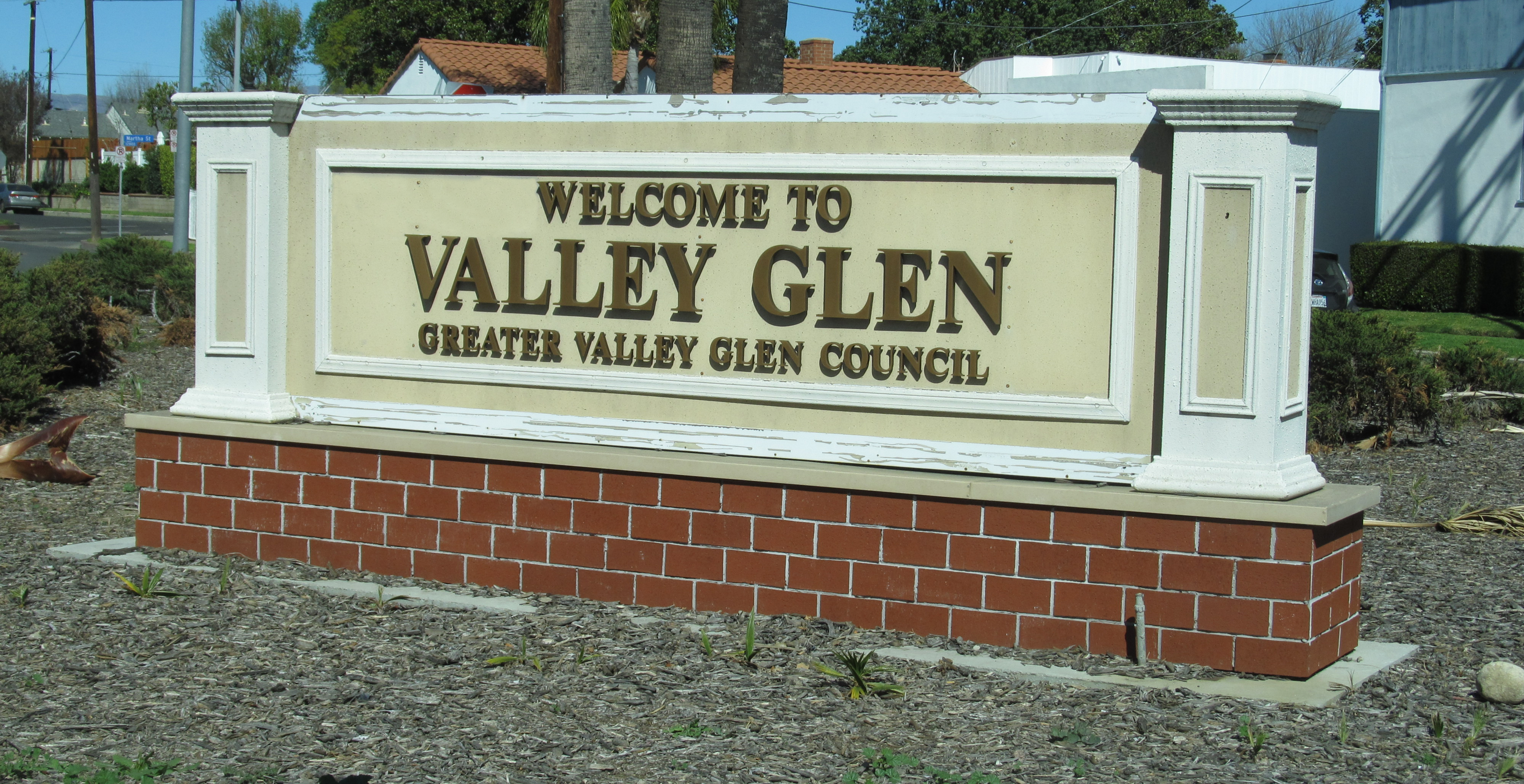
Valley Glen monument at the intersection of Burbank Boulevard and Coldwater Canyon Avenue.

== Arts and culture ==
The Great Wall of Los Angeles, a half mile-long mural portraying the history of California "as seen through the eyes of women and minorities," stretches along the concrete sides of the Tujunga Wash, and is credited with being one of the longest murals in the world. It was nominated for the National Register of Historic Places on May 10, 2017.

== Emergency services ==
=== Fire service ===
Los Angeles Fire Department operates Station 102 (South Van Nuys/Valley Glen), serving the community.

=== Police service ===
The Los Angeles Police Department operates the nearby Van Nuys Community Police Station located at 6420 Sylmar Avenue, 91401, which serves the neighborhood.

== Parks and Recreation ==
- Laurel Grove Park =

Improvements include:

- Walking and wheelchair trails and outdoor fitness stations
- New playground equipment with safe and clean resilient surfacing and shade
- New group picnic area with picnic tables, hydration station, pet fountain, shade canopy and game tables
- New butterfly garden
- New shrubs, ground cover and visually pleasing hedge plantings
- New LED lighting
- Valley Glen Community Park (formerly Erwin Park) is an unstaffed park located in Valley Glen. The park has a baseball diamond and picnic tables.
- Tujunga Wash Greenway

== Education ==
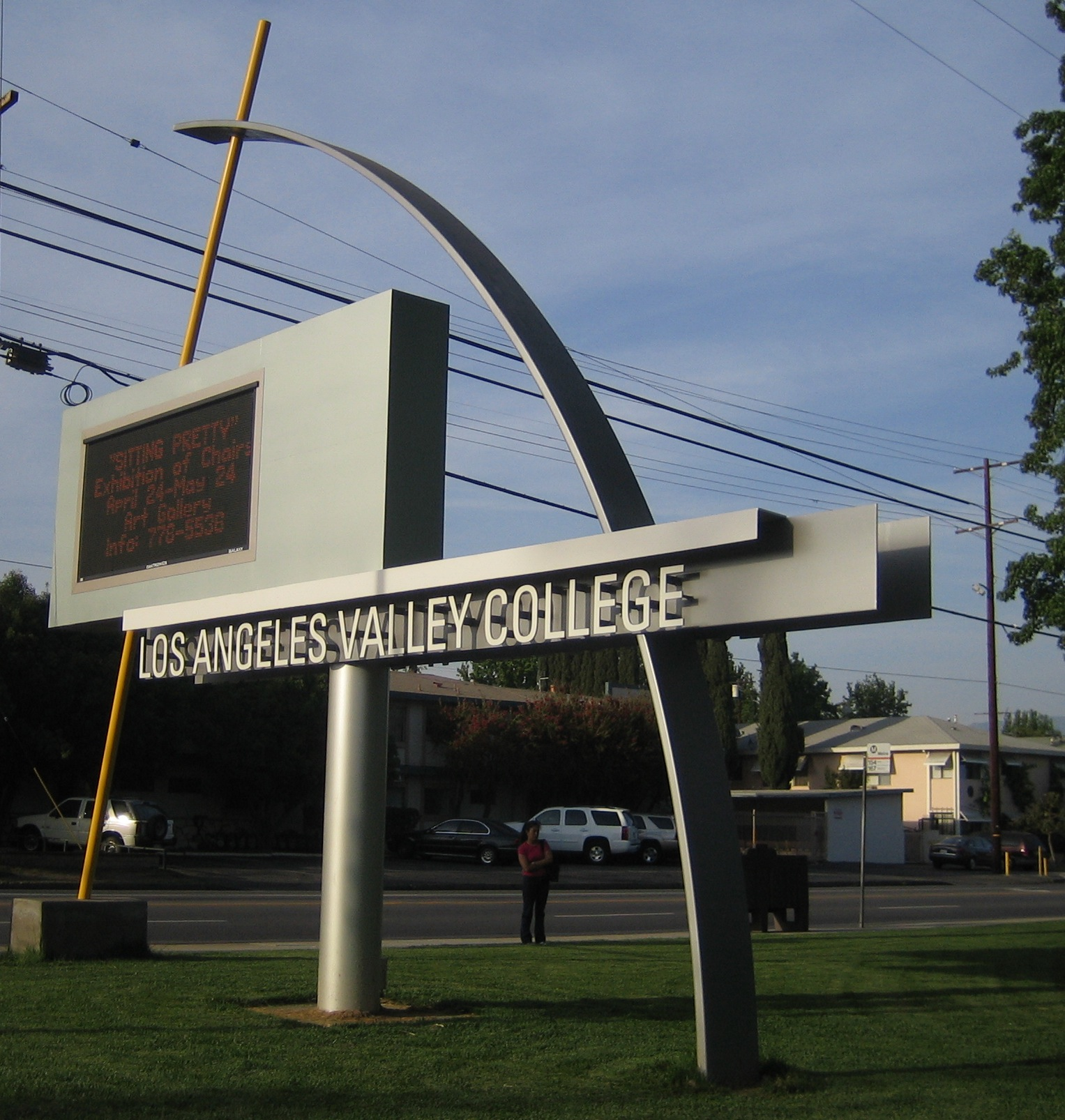
Los Angeles Valley College

Valley Glen is home to Los Angeles Valley College.

Schools within the Valley View boundaries are:

=== Public ===
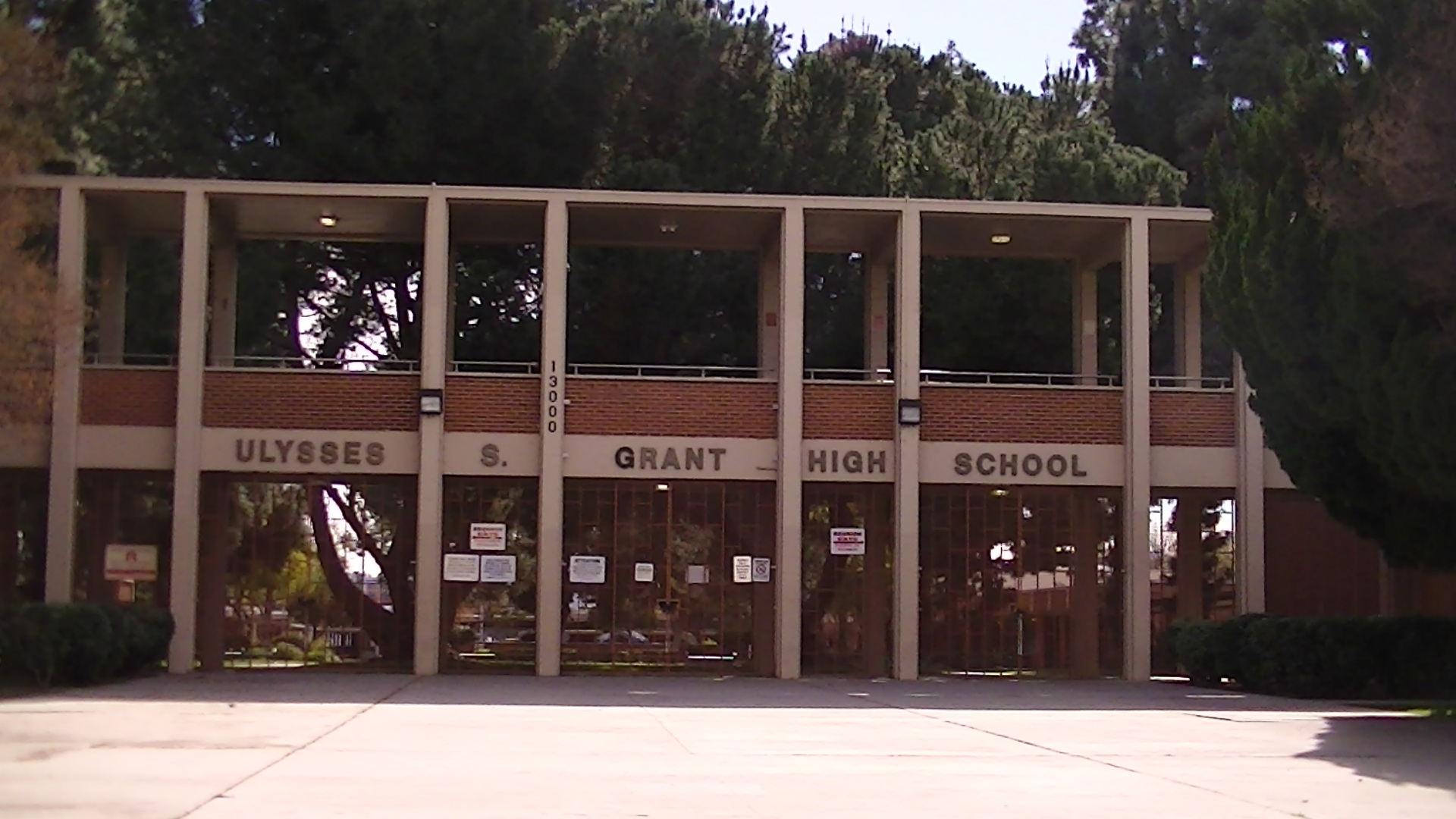
Ulysses S. Grant High School

- Ulysses S. Grant High School, 13000 Oxnard Street
- James Madison Middle School, 13000 Hart Street
- Coldwater Canyon Elementary School, 6850 Coldwater Canyon Avenue
- Kittridge Street Elementary School, 13619 Kittridge Street
- Erwin Elementary School, 13400 Erwin Street
- John B. Monlux Elementary School, 6051 Bellaire Avenue
- Jack London Continuation School, 1294 Oxnard Street
