= Documenteur =

1981 film by Agnès Varda

- Directed by: Agnès Varda
- Written by: Agnès Varda
- Starring: Sabine Mamou; Mathieu Demy
- Cinematography: Ace Armanaki; Nurith Aviv; Affonso Beato; Bob Carr; Mosh Levin; Tom Taplin
- Edited by: Sabine Mamou; Bob Gould
- Music by: Georges Delerue
- Production company: Ciné-Tamaris
- Distributed by: MK2 Diffusion
- Release date: 1981
- Running time: 65 min
- Countries: France; United States
- Languages: French; English

Documenteur also known as Documenteur: An Emotion Picture is a French-American feature film by French director Agnès Varda. The film debuted at the 1981 Toronto International Film Festival.

The film stars Sabine Mamou as a single mother and Varda's son Mathieu Demy as her son.

Though the film stands on its own it was made as a companion piece to the documentary Mur Murs in which Varda filmed mural art around L.A. and interviewed the artists who had made the pieces. Many of the murals filmed in Mur Murs appears in Documenteur and the film even opens with the same image as Mur Murs ended on.

== Plot ==
A Frenchwoman, Emilie (Sabine Mamou) slowly puts her life together after the breakup of her partner, finding a home for herself and her son and adjusting to life as a single mother.

While working as a typist, transcribing work for a writer she meets a film crew who have made a documentary on the murals of L.A. Though they originally intended to have her employer reading the narration they ask Emilie to do it instead.

== Cast ==
- Sabine Mamou as Emilie
- Mathieu Demy as Martin, her son
- Tina Odom as Tina, the waitress
- Lisa Blok as Lisa, the friend
- Tom Taplin as Tom Cooper

== Release ==
The film played a handful of festivals upon its release in 1981. In August 2015 home distribution company The Criterion Collection remastered and released the film on DVD packaged with Mur Murs and other films that Varda had made while living in California under a box set called Agnès Varda in California.
