= On the Verge (TV series) =

- Genre: Comedy drama
- Created by: Julie Delpy
- Written by: Julie Delpy; Alexia Landeau; Emily Ryan Lerner
- Story by: Julie Delpy; Alexia Landeau
- Directed by: Julie Delpy; Mathieu Demy; David Petrarca
- Starring: Julie Delpy; Elisabeth Shue; Sarah Jones; Alexia Landeau; Mathieu Demy; Troy Garity; Timm Sharp; Giovanni Ribisi
- Music by: Michael Penn
- Countries of origin: United States; France
- Original languages: English; French
- No. of episodes: 12

Production
- Executive producers: Julie Delpy; Elisabeth Shue; Alexia Landeau; Olivier Gauriat; Rola Bauer; Michael Gentile; Lauraine Heftler
- Cinematography: Doug Emmett; Nicole Whitaker
- Editors: Fabienne Bouville; Liza Cardinale; Sam Seig
- Running time: 28–35 minutes
- Production companies: The Film TV; Canal+

Original release
- Network: OCS (France); Netflix (international)
- Release: September 7, 2021

On the Verge is a comedy-drama television series created by and starring Julie Delpy, alongside Elisabeth Shue, Sarah Jones, Alexia Landeau, Mathieu Demy, Troy Garity, Timm Sharp, and Giovanni Ribisi. Produced by The Film TV, in association with Canal+, and it premiered on September 7, 2021 internationally on Netflix and on OCS in France.

== Cast ==
- Julie Delpy as Justine
- Elisabeth Shue as Anne
- Sarah Jones as Yasmin
- Alexia Landeau as Ell
- Mathieu Demy as Martin
- Troy Garity as George
- Timm Sharp as William
- Giovanni Ribisi as Jerry
- Kai To as Kai
- Christopher Convery as Albert
- Sutton Waldman as Sebastian
- Duke Cutler as Oliver
- Daphne Albert as Sarah
- Larry Weissman as Cookbook Author
