= Isabel Castro (artist) =

American multimedia artist

- Born: 1954 (age 71–72); Mexico City
- Education: USC Roski School of Fine Arts; USC Rossier School of Education
- Notable work: Women Under Fire

Isabel Castro, also known as Isabel Castro-Melendez, (born 1954) is a Mexican American artist born in Mexico City. She was raised and still resides in Los Angeles, California. Aside from being an artist, Castro's career includes curatorial work, education, journalism and photography.

== Education ==
Isabel Castro attended Belmont High School. In 1976, she received a bachelor's degree of Fine Arts at USC Roski School of Fine Arts. Castro gained her education at the University of Southern California, Los Angeles (USC) in 2015 with a master's degree in arts journalism. She also did research at USC Rossier School of Education in 1998 and received her master's degree in Arts Journalism (USC) in 2015.

== Artwork ==
Isabel Castro's “Women Under Fire” series (1980) is mixed media, scratched and dyed slides printed on Xerox. The pictures are underdeveloped and the scratched pigments element is strategically placed over the women's faces and bodies to represent the systemic violence imposed on Mexican American women. At the time, forced sterilization was occurring at USC Medical Center in Los Angeles and at an East Los Angeles hospital in the 1970s. The gun targets on the images were strategically placed on each woman to make their bodies targets of stereotypes. The women that posed for the photographs in the “Women Under Fire” Series were not survivors of forced sterilization themselves but had family or friends that had been forcibly sterilized.

Another artwork by Castro is "X Rated Bondage" (1980). The artwork includes six gelatin silver prints. The images depicted are rephotographed images from pornography magazines that illustrate the sexual exploitation of Mexican America women. This exploitation relates to Mexican American women choosing sex work due to systematic racism limiting their career opportunities.

Other artwork by Castro includes "Corpus Christi, from Méchicano 1977 Calendario" created in 1976 and is screen print on paper.

== Career ==
=== Curator ===
Isabel Castro's curatorial career began in the late 1990s. She curated a variety of fine art Chicano and music/sound of Latino Art. Castro co-curated two demonstrations, one that is held at the UCLA Fowler Museum corridos, and the other being held at the Smithsonian. Some of her curatorial activities include co-curating “Corridos Sin Fronteras: A New World Ballad Tradition”, which was an exhibition at the Fowler Museum at UCLA in June 1998. This exhibition was presented again in 2002 with support from the UCLA Chicano Studies Research Center, Smithsonian Latino Center and the Smithsonian Institution Traveling Exhibition Services. The "Corridos Sin Fronteras" exhibition represents the history and celebrates the diversity of Mexican American ballads (corridos). Around the same time, she assisted with the Arhoolie Foundation’s Strachwitz Frontera Collection project at the Chicano Studies Research Center (CSRC) at UCLA. The Frontera Collection was sponsored by Los Tigres Del Norte fund at UCLA and is the largest digitized collection of Spanish music recorded in the U.S from 1905 to 1955.

=== Educator ===
Isabel Castro has served as an executive board member and founder of the Plaza de la Raza Cultural Center for the Arts and Education. She has also worked on "Teach and Learn" by the USC Shoah Foundation Institute for Visual History and Education. Castro has also contributed to the websites of Newseum and "Recovering the U.S. Hispanic Literary Heritage Project".

=== Journalist ===
Isabel Castro's journalism master's thesis project was the archival "Echoes of the Mexican Voice" website, as part of the USC Annenberg School of Communication and Journalism's Specialized Journalism program. The project stemmed from the Mexican Voice Collection that documents Mexican American youth culture from 1930 to the 1940s. Parts of the collection are housed in various university libraries, including Charles E. Young Research Library at UCLA.

Castro worked on "The Ruben Salazar Timeline" at USC Annenberg School of Journalism, which is an archival webpage on Ruben Salazar, a Latino journalist. She has also been involved with the Johnny Cash Project .

== Select exhibitions ==
- 1976 Las Chicanas: Venas de la Mujer, Woman's Building, Los Angeles, CA
- 1978 Hecho en Latinoamérica: Primera muestra de la fotografia latinoamericana contemporanea, Museo de Arte Moderno, Mexico City
- 1981 Hecho en Latinoamérica: Segundo coloquio latinoamericano de fotografia, Palacio de Bellas Artes, Mexico City
- 1983 Con Carino: Chicano Photography, Friedrich-Alexander-Universitat Erlangen-Nurnberg, Germany
- 1983-84 Chicano Voices and Visions: A National Exhibit of Women Artists, Social and Public Art Resource Center (SPARC), Venice, CA
- 2017 Radical Women: Latin American Art (1960-1985), Hammer Museum, Los Angeles, CA
- 2024 Xican-a.o.x. Body, Pérez Art Museum Miami, Florida
