= Mur Murs =

1980 documentary film by Agnès Varda

- Film poster
- Directed by: Agnès Varda
- Written by: Agnès Varda
- Narrated by: Agnès Varda
- Cinematography: Bernard Auroux
- Edited by: Sabine Mamou
- Release date: 1981
- Running time: 82 minutes
- Country: France
- Languages: French, English

Mur Murs ([myʁ myʁ], French for "wall walls", also punning on English "murmurs") is a 1981 documentary film directed by Agnès Varda. The film explores the murals of Los Angeles, California.

== Subject and style ==
The vast majority of the scenes of the film are shots of murals, which are all located in the city of Los Angeles, often with the mural's painter or model staged in front of the mural for dramatic effect. The film alternates between voiceover narration by Agnès Varda and commentary about the murals provided by the murals' creators, as well as commentary provided by locals living in the area. The film also includes several musical performances, including by Chicano punk band Los Illegals.

Much of the film's attention is focused on work by Chicano artists, although artists from other backgrounds are also covered extensively. The film also dwells on the role of state violence, both as it affects the communities the murals are situated in and the murals themselves.

The film's title is a pun: literally "Wall Walls" in French, Varda suggests that the murals on the walls are in fact murmuring to each other.

== Production and release ==
Mur Murs was produced by Varda alongside Documenteur: An Emotion Picture, a drama film about a French woman living in Los Angeles, set against the same murals that are the subject of Mur Murs and starring several of the people who worked on Mur Murs.

The film was screened at the 1981 Cannes Film Festival.

== Reception and legacy ==
A contemporary review in The New York Times written for a screening of the film at a film festival described the film as "lively and energetic".

In a review published by Film School Rejects about a Criterion Collection box set of Agnès Varda's films shot in California, Farah Cheded describes Mur Murs as having "perfect composition" in its depiction of "dazzlingly painted" walls.

== See also ==
- Asco (art collective)
- Kent Twitchell
- Mexican muralism
- Judy Baca
- Harry Gamboa Jr.
