= Anti-Coolie Act =

Anti-immigrant law on Chinese labor in the US

On February 19, 1862, the 37th United States Congress passed An Act to Prohibit the "Coolie Trade" by American Citizens in American Vessels. A similar act, which would be called the Anti-Coolie Act of 1862 in short, was passed by the California State Legislature in an attempt to appease rising anger among white laborers about salary competition created by the influx of Chinese immigrants at the height of the California Gold Rush. The act sought to protect white laborers by imposing a monthly tax on Chinese immigrants seeking to do business in the state of California.

== Initial frustration with Chinese labor ==
Prior to the California gold rush of the 1850s, the Chinese population in the west, described at the time with the derogatory word "coolie", was minimal and tolerated by many Americans who migrated to the west to explore the new frontier. However, the California gold rush not only led to a steep increase in the white American population but also in the Chinese through immigration to the West. In 1852, California experienced an influx of 20,026 Chinese immigrants as compared to 2,716 just the year before. The large of influx of immigrants were met with race riots as white miners became frustrated with the increased competition for business.

The intense emotions felt by a dense workforce, however, had more room to heat up, as they were exacerbated when America went through a recession between 1853 and 1854. The 1853 recession, characterized by low growth in the United States economy, featured American businesses contracting by 18.4% as interest rates rose and railroad investments decreased. The decrease in railroad investments drastically slowed down investments in the Wild West of California. What's more, commodity prices, including gold, dropped during that period. Thus, coupling the decrease in railroad investments with falling gold prices, the very source of the West's boom was strongly hurt and this served to worsen conditions in the west. The atmosphere would then become increasingly hostile, as segregation tools in the region were created, beginning with the creation of "coolie clubs".

== Coolie clubs ==
In the wake of the 1853 recession, many Californians who owned the rights to the land on which the gold was mined were looking for cheap labor to maximize profits. Chinese immigrants came to America for a variety of reasons, including longstanding trans-Pacific economic connections, a culture of migrant work in the Pearl River delta region, and the presence of reasonably fast trade routes to the United States, and the allure of gold. Many Chinese immigrants made the voyage on credit, and upon arrival in California had no choice but to accept lower wages to repay their creditors. As a result of their lower demand for wages, and their tendency to form self-supporting communities without much support from their employers, Chinese immigrants became the preferred option of labor for many landowners. Domestic miners responded with the creation of "anticoolie" clubs that sought to create clear divisions between white workers and Chinese workers. The clubs almost served like white unions that represented the interests of the white miners in the west, and they expanded in prominence as manufacturing jobs moved to the west and Chinese workers continued to play the role of cheap labor. In 1857, just a few years prior to the passage of the Anti-Coolie Act in California, Chinese workers were accepting wages between one and two dollars less than their white counterparts.

== Anti-Coolie Act of 1862 ==
The California legislature's formal attack on Chinese immigrants began in 1852 with the passage of a foreign miners' tax that imposed a three-dollar monthly tax on foreign miners in the state. In 1855, the California legislature followed up the passage of that act with another act entitled Discourage the Immigration to this State of Persons who Became Citizens thereof. However, after more pressure came from white miners, who teamed up with sympathizers in the Democratic Party to encourage the passage of the Anti-Coolie Act, it was indeed passed. The act was ratified by California's state legislature on April 26, 1862 and was an attempt to increase the scope of their authority by levying a $2.50 tax on anyone of Chinese origin who applied for licenses "to work in the mines, or to prosecute some kind of business...." Yet, with the Chinese population still steadily increasing, reaching 107,000 in 1890, the act marked only the beginning of direct segregation against the Chinese.

What would follow from the 1862 Anti-Coolie Act would be several anti-Chinese acts that served to discriminate against them. Eight years later, the Naturalization Act of 1870 allowed Africans to become citizens through naturalization, while continuing to exclude Asians. In 1882, Congress passed the Chinese Exclusion Act, which more directly restricted Chinese immigration and naturalization.

== See also ==
- Stop Asian Hate
- Chinese immigration to the United States
- Chinese Labor in the Southern United States
