= Social and Public Art Resource Center =

Coordinates: 33.991606°N 118.458665°W

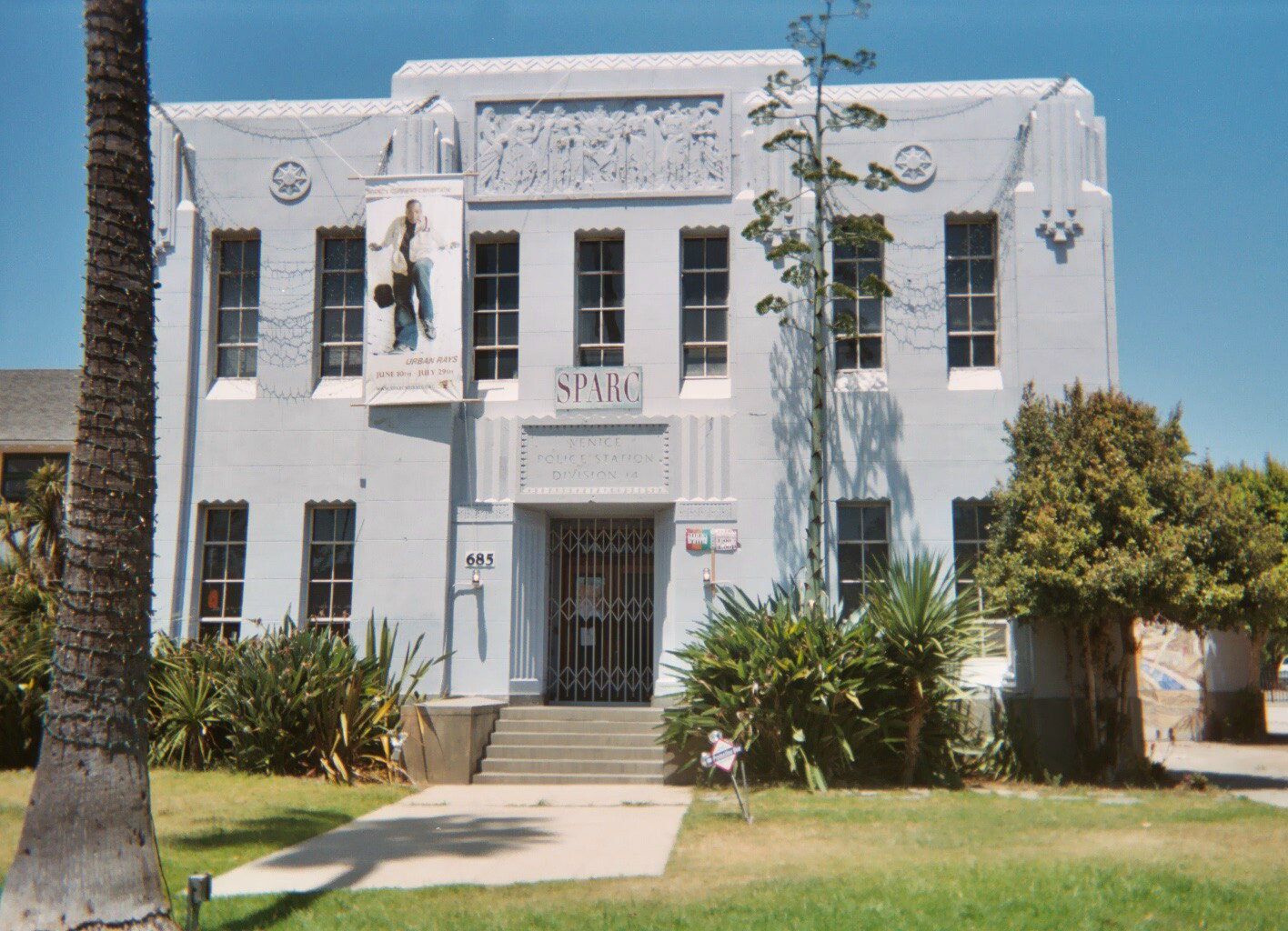
- SPARC building, Venice, California
- Abbreviation: SPARC
- Formation: 1976
- Founder: Judy Baca, Donna Deitch and Christina Schlesinger
- Type: non-profit
- Location: 685 Venice Blvd., Venice, California 90291
- Website: http://www.sparcinla.org

The Social and Public Art Resource Center (SPARC or SPARCinLA) is a non-profit community arts center based in Venice, California. SPARC hosts exhibitions, sponsors workshops and murals, and lobbies for the preservation of Los Angeles area murals and other works of public art. SPARC hosts several community programs and artist spaces, including the UCLA@SPARC Digital Mural Lab, a "comprehensive" archive, printmaking studios, an art gallery and a University of California, Los Angeles (UCLA) graduate program. According to its mission statement, "SPARC espouses public art as an organizing tool for addressing contemporary issues, fostering cross-cultural understanding and promoting civic dialogue."

== History ==
Inspired by the Chicano art movement, SPARC was founded in 1976 by muralist and activist Judy Baca, (who continues to serve as artistic director), painter Christina Schlesinger, and filmmaker Donna Deitch. It was an outgrowth of the "Friends of the Citywide Mural Program", a community organization dedicated to supporting Baca's work with the Los Angeles Citywide Mural Program, a city-funded project to beautify city walls and divert the energies of youth in gang-afflicted areas. Almost immediately, censorship issues led to the artists realizing that they need to create an organization to back up their work. The initialism "SPARC" was chosen intentionally, as the organization was intended to "spark" "a movement toward identity and justice." Schlesinger suggested the idea of a spark because she was inspired by the work of the 1960s group, the Weatherman who used that phrase initially. "And it seemed to us that we were in the middle of a time, that had a kind of, that was a renaissance. That it was a, that art was coming back to very sort of basics, that it was becoming a populace kind of activity, that it was no longer an activity only for rich people."

In 1977, SPARC took up residence in a two-story Art Deco building that had served as the Venice jail since 1929. Deitch describes that originally they "broke in" and took over and cleaned out the former jail. The building was eventually obtained through "a lot of political maneuvering," and it was free. The SPARC building features a gallery, five artists' studios, a darkroom, and houses Baca's archives as well as those of Minna Agins.

SPARC's first project was the monumental mural project The Great Wall of Los Angeles, which is one of the largest murals in the world. It depicts scenes from the history of California on the side of the Tujunga wash, and was created by thousands of volunteers and workers. The over 2,000 foot long mural was commissioned as a beautification project by the Army Corps of Engineers. About 400 of the mural's workers were teens, many of them "part of the juvenile justice system." Funding was provided by the Comprehensive Employment and Training Act.

Beginning in 1988, SPARC undertook a program called Great Walls Unlimited: Neighborhood Pride, which painted 105 murals in neighborhoods throughout Los Angeles. Ninety-five artists were hired to create the murals and then they hired about 1100 young people to work as apprentices in the community. The Great Walls program ran from 1988 to 2003, when there was a mural moratorium in Los Angeles.

Amongst other projects, SPARC took part in the creation of the World Wall: a 100-foot diameter circle composed of seven panels, each 10 feet by 30 feet, which traveled to public spaces both on a national and international scale. The project premiered in June of 1990 in Joensuu, Finland at “A Meeting of the Worlds.” A “Vision of the Future Without Fear” was artistically intervened by Finnish artists, before then travelling to Moscow, USSR, where it was exhibited and consequently added onto by Russian artist Alexi Begov.

SPARC, along with the Mural Conservancy of Los Angeles, has been instrumental in documenting and preserving murals. In addition, both groups have created an artistic culture that views the murals of Los Angeles as part of the city's "collection" of art.

== Today ==
The SPARC website hosts an archive of digital images of Los Angeles murals (currently in development), as well as a discussion forum.

Recent events include the organization's annual Día de los Muertos Celebration, and involvement in the Venice Art Crawl.

On March 7th, 2026, the LA Philharmonic presented The Great Wall of Los Angeles, an event carried out in collaboration with SPARC and featuring orchestral compositions inspired by the Great Wall of Los Angeles. Six composers were brought together by conductor Gustavo Dudamel and curator Gabriela Ortiz to create pieces based on the Great Wall of Los Angeles, as tribute to Angelenos and the history of the city. The hour-long performance, performed by the LA Philharmonic at Walt Disney Hall, featured six musical scores from composers Juhi Bansal, Nicolás Lell Benavides, Viet Cuong, Estevan Olmos, Xavier Muzik, and Nina Shekhar. In addition to this, an original film was added and synced to the performance, displayed on a sizable screen above the stage. The short film, shot at the site of the Great Wall of Los Angeles, and centered on highlighting its visuals, was directed and produced by award-winning director Alejandro González Iñárritu and cinematographer Emmanuel “Chivo” Lubezki.

In 2026, the Great Wall of Los Angeles was included in ARTnews’ “100 Best Artworks About America” list, ranking in at 19.

SPARC receives donations from different sources and in conjunction with grant funding, helps the organization deliver many of its large scale projects.

The Durón Gallery inside of the SPARC building is used to "present socially relevant and politically conscious art." It often features new exhibitions, highlighting the work of local and international artists.
