= Under the Stars (1993 film) =

1993 romantic drama film

- À la belle étoile
- Directed by: Antoine Desrosières
- Written by: Antoine Desrosières
- Produced by: Frédéric Robbes; Pierre-André Thiébaud
- Starring: Mathieu Demy; Julie Gayet; Chiara Mastroianni; Melvil Poupaud
- Cinematography: George Lechaptois
- Edited by: Catherine Bonetat
- Music by: Julien Lourau; Bojan Zulfikarpasic
- Release date: 1993
- Country: France
- Language: French

Under the Stars (French: À la belle étoile) is a 1993 drama and romance French film directed by Antoine Desrosières. It won the 1994 Winner Golden Moon of Valencia.

== Synopsis ==
Thomas, a 17-year-old looking for love, comes to understand how his life finally belongs to him with the help of four young women.

== Cast ==
- Mathieu Demy as Thomas
- Julie Gayet as Hannah
- Aurélia Thierrée as Marion Moullet
- Chiara Mastroianni as Claire
- Camila Mora-Scheihing as Rebecca
- Melvil Poupaud as Mathieu
- Liliane Dreyfus as Thomas' mother
- Luc Moullet as Professor Moullet
- Eddy Moine as Dr. Allard
- Antoine Desrosières as Alison
- Bethsabée Dreyfus as Lena
- Jérôme Estienne
- Simon Reggiani
