= Judy Baca =

American artist and academic (born 1946)

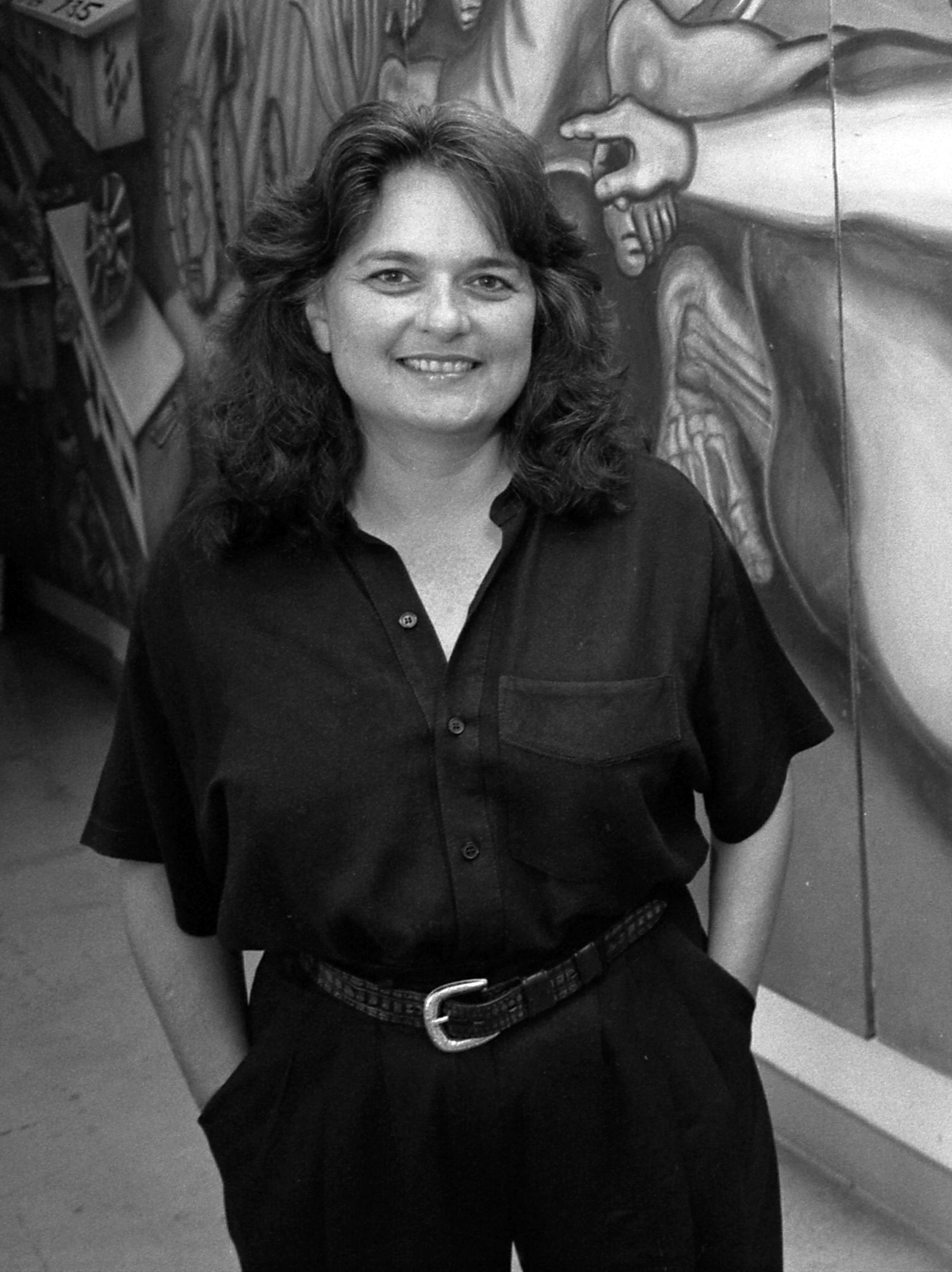
- Baca in 1988
- Born: Judith Francisca Baca; September 20, 1946 (age 80); Los Angeles, California
- Education: Cal State Northridge
- Known for: Mural; SPARC
- Notable work: Great Wall of Los Angeles
- Movement: Chicano Moratorium; Chicano Movement
- Website: judybaca.com

Judith Francisca "Judy" Baca (born September 20, 1946) is a Chicana muralist, activist, and educator best known for directing the Great Wall of Los Angeles, which was the largest known communal mural project in the world as of 2018. Painted along the Tujunga Wash in the San Fernando Valley, the mural depicts the history of California through the experiences of people of color often left out of history books, including the Dust Bowl migration, the internment of Japanese Americans, Zoot Suit Riots, and the Freedom Rides. Baca designed it from interviews with residents and consultations with historians, and painted the first phase with more than 400 young people, artists, and scholars over seven summers from 1976 to 1984; many of the youth were referred to the project by the justice system.

Baca co-founded the Social and Public Art Resource Center (SPARC) in Venice, California, in 1976, and the Great Wall was its first project. She is SPARC's artistic director and professor emerita of Chicana/o studies and world arts and cultures at the University of California, Los Angeles.

== Biography ==
=== Early life ===
Baca was born in Watts, Los Angeles on September 20, 1946, to Mexican American parents. Her military father never knew of her existence and moved back to the east coast after her birth. In her early life in Watts, she was raised in a predominately Black and Latino area. She lived in an all-female household composed of her mother, her aunts Rita and Delia, and her grandmother Francisca. Her grandmother was an herbal healer and practiced curandera, which profoundly influenced her sense of indigenous Chicano culture.

Baca's mother later married Clarence Ferrari in 1952, and the three of them moved to Pacoima, Los Angeles. Pacoima was drastically different from Watts – Mexican-Americans were minorities in Pacoima. Baca has a half-brother Gary and half-sister Diane.

=== Education ===
Baca was not allowed to speak Spanish in elementary school, as it was prohibited, but she did not know English very well. Her teacher would tell her to go paint in the corner while the other children studied. After some time, Baca started getting better in classes once she was able to understand the textbooks. With the encouragement of her art teacher, she began drawing and painting. She later graduated from Bishop Alemany High School in 1964.

She then attended California State University, Northridge (CSUN) and earned her bachelor's degree in 1969 and a master's degree in fine art in 1979. Judy was the first Baca to attend college, and actually quit for a brief period of time after becoming tired of being poor. She sought out a job in production illustration and worked there until she was inspired to go back to college and get a Bachelors of Fine Art. While there, she learned and studied modern abstract art. She wanted to make art that was accessible beyond the constraints of the gallery and the museum. She wanted to make art for the people she loved, but she knew that they didn't go to galleries. "I thought to myself, if I get my work into galleries, who will go there? People in my family hadn't ever been to a gallery in their entire lives. My neighbors never went to galleries...And it didn't make sense to me at the time to put art behind some guarded wall." After completing graduate school, Baca continued her education, studying muralism at La Tallera in Cuernavaca, Mexico.

== Works of art ==
=== Las Vistas Nuevas ===
In the summer of 1970, Baca decided to create a mural in Boyle Heights in order to bring community together. In the first team she had twenty members from four different gangs, and the group decided on the name Las Vistas Nuevas ("New Views"). The mural they would create would show images that would be familiar to the Mexican-Americans who were living in the neighborhood. "I want to use public space to create a public voice for, and a public consciousness about people who are, in fact, the majority of the population but who are not represented in any visual way.

=== Raspados Mojados ===
In Raspados Mojados Baca used a street vendor cart as a sculptural installation to address immigration issues and the misrepresentations of Mexicans living in the United States. Los Angeles street vendors constantly sell ice cream as well as Mexican snacks, fruit cocktails, corn on the cob, and raspados. This has brought attention to Los Angeles and has attempted to pass pushcarts loitering laws into any city. At the front of the cart a painting of a Mexican man captioned “illegal alien, undocumented worker” which is the main focus of the painting presented on the cart. On one side of the cart there is a painting of a man who is being dragged across a fence representing the Mexican/us border to the U.S. It is labeled Bracero Wars or also known as the Mexican Farm Labor Program. Bracero is a Spanish term meaning "manual laborer" or "one who works using his arms.”

The Bracero Program started on August 4, 1942, when many growers feared that World War II would bring labor shortages to low-paying agricultural jobs. That is when the idea of bringing Mexicans legally to help with those shortages. Mexicans signed contracts to come to the U.S. legally only to work farm jobs where needed. They were given free housing, meals at reasonable prices, insurance provided by the employer's expense, and free transportation back to Mexico at the end of their contract. They were only allowed to hire immigrants where shortages were existing but rules were not followed. Growers benefited from hungry working Mexicans from their cheap labor.

Next to that painting, there is one with Mexicans at their farm jobs, with painting or tattoos on their back, as well as one with the LA skyscrapers while women sweep and work. The tattoos show their heritage and backgrounds as well as how they have been mistreated by the U.S. and what it was like crossing with many other Mexican immigrants to help support their families.

=== Las Tres Marías ===
In 1976 Baca created an installation piece of an upholstered triptych that displays two identities of femininity in Chicana culture: La Pachuca and La Chola. These archetypes are on opposite sides, separated by a mirror in the center. Baca created this art installation as a way to bring attention to the different forms of identity expressed when one looks in the mirror.

Having drawn inspiration from the culture that Baca was born and raised in she implemented this identity of La Pachuca. An identity that is a part of the Pachuco identity and subculture that is known for challenging the societal norms within the U.S. It is also an identity that Baca herself has performed in other artworks, such as her photographed performance where Baca dressed up as a Pachuca with several photographs taken of her by Donna Deitch, and a print titled Absolutely Chicana (2009). The Chola is an identity within the Chicana culture that derives from the Pachuca identity, one that Baca implemented in her art work with the help of a member from the Tiny Locas gang known as Flaquita that can be seen as the chola on the far left panel.

The triptych itself serves as a form of symbolism and homage to the Christian religious art in the triptych format and in title since Las Tres Marías translates to the three Marys. Rather than using the image of the Virgin Mary, Baca used these illustrated panels "as a commentary on the limited range of Mexican American female types in both eras."

=== Mi Abuelita ===
Their first project was on three walls of an outdoor stage in Hollenbeck Park. Mi Abuelita ("My Grandmother") was a mural that depicted a Mexican-American grandmother with her arms outstretched as if to give a hug. "This work recognized the primary position of the matriarch in Mexican families. It also marked the first step in the development of a unique collective process that employs art to mediate between rival gang members competing for public space and public identity."

Local police did not like the idea of rival gang members working together, fearing it would spark gang violence. Baca also began to work on the mural without permission from the city or the manager of Hollenbeck Park, which engendered questions from her supervisor and other city officials.

Despite all these troubles, Baca wanted to finish the project. She had lookouts who would signal the mural team if rival gang members were headed toward the work site, or if the police were coming. One day a city official came to the park because he had been getting complaints about the project. After seeing the progress done and team members working so well with each other, he gave Baca permission from the city to complete the mural. "The city was amazed at the work I was doing, making murals with kids who scared directors out of neighborhood centers."

After its completion, the community loved Mi Abuelita. Baca said, "Everybody related to it. People brought candles to that site. For 12 years people put flowers at the base of the grandmother image." Las Vistas Nuevas would complete a total of three murals that summer.

After the murals she was offered a job in 1970 as the director of a new citywide mural program. She was in charge of creating this program from the ground up, which included choosing where murals would go, designing the murals, and supervising the mural painting teams, which would consist of teenagers who were in trouble with the police. Members of the original Las Vistas Nuevas group were hired to help run Baca's multi-site program. This group would go on to paint more than 500 murals.

In this new job she encountered her first problems with censorship. People in neighborhoods where murals were being created wanted to show all parts of life in their neighborhood, both the good and bad. The city, however, did not want any controversial subjects depicted in these murals. In one case, when the city objected to a mural that showed people struggling with police, they threatened to stop funding the program if Baca did not remove it. Baca said, "I really liked the idea that the work could not be owned by anyone. So, therefore it wasn't going to be interesting to the rich or to the wealthy, and it didn't have to meet the caveats of art that museums would be interested in. Rather than give in, she formed the Social and Public Art Resource Center (SPARC) in 1976 to continue funding the creation of murals in public.

Baca's efforts to include community in her artistic processes make her different to her time. Bringing youth together to create art left a lasting impression in Los Angeles, shifting Chicano/a culture. The involvement of poor youth of color in Baca's artistic processes changed the way white supremacist, capitalist, patriarchal culture perceived their place in society. Perhaps even more importantly, Baca's Citywide Mural Program strengthened community and gave people a sense of purpose.

=== The World Wall and other projects ===
In 1987 she began painting The World Wall: A Vision of the Future Without Fear, a painting that showed the world with no-violence. She believed the first step to world peace was imagining it, and she wanted artists from all over the world to help her paint it. She wanted it to be painted in panels so it could be moved around to different places. After years of planning and contributions made by artists from other countries, the painting had its debut in Finland in 1990. The idea was that when the panels traveled around the world each host country would add their own panel to the collection. Some of the countries included Russia, Israel/Palestine, Mexico, and Canada.

In 1988 Mayor of Los Angeles Tom Bradley commissioned her to create the Neighborhood Pride Program, a citywide project to paint murals. The project employed over 1,800 at-risk youth and has been responsible for the creation of over 105 murals throughout the city.In 1996 she created La Memoria de Nuestra Tierra ("Our Land Has Memory") for the Denver International Airport. This one was personal for Baca, as her grandparents fled Mexico during the Mexican Revolution and came to La Junta, Colorado. The mural's intent was "not only to tell the forgotten stories of people who, like birds or water, traveled back and forth across the land freely, before there was a line that distinguished which side you were from, but to speak to our shared human condition as temporary residents of the earth...The making of this work was an excavation of a remembering of their histories." It was completed in 2000.

She conducted research by interviewing residents and lead a workshop with University of Southern Colorado students. She found a picture in a garage in Pueblo by Juan Espinosa, photographer and founder El Diario de la Gente, Boulder, Colorado, of an important meeting between Corky Gonzales of the Colorado Crusade for Justice and Cesar Chavez of the United Farm Workers, and their agreement to bring the Delano grape strike to Colorado.

Baca spoke at the "Against the Wall: The ruin and renewal of LA's murals" panel held at Morono Kiang Gallery, across the street from the famous Pope of Broadway mural. In that same year, she made the Cesar Chavez Monument Arch of Dignity, Equality, and Justice. It is located at San Jose State University and has portrait mosaics of Cesar Chavez, Mahatma Gandhi, Robert F. Kennedy, and Dolores Huerta.

=== Feminism and art ===
As a Chicana woman, she wanted to empower women of color and bring community together in Los Angeles. Baca did so by illuminating the beauty and power enriched in Chicana culture through public art. The processes behind the images that Baca created are equally powerful—Baca's premise in her artistic process was to involve disempowered youth in order to evoke a sense of community and enable growth. In some ways, these acts cause Baca's art to be feminist. On the other hand, identity is personal, and only Baca has the agency to identify herself and her art as feminist. After divorcing her husband and moving to Venice she becomes involved with "Consciousness Raising" meetings. After being invited to one of the meetings by her new landlord, Baca says she began meeting other professional women for the first time in her life. "Women who were doctors, and lawyers, and biologists, and chemists, and I had never met anybody like that. I was like completely amazed at the possibility of what was available for women". Through these she was introduced to feminist art by Judy Chicago and inspired by a few of her works, naming Woman's Space, Woman's Building, and the Feminist Studio Workshop.

== Social and Public Art Resource Center (SPARC) ==
=== Great Wall of Los Angeles ===
Social and Public Art Resource Center (SPARC) was founded in 1976 by Judy Baca, artist/teacher Christina Schlesinger, and filmmaker/director Donna Deitch. The artistic direction was inspired by the idea that arts should center everyday people. SPARC's first project was the Great Wall of Los Angeles. Baca envisioned a mural project for East LA but the city council turned her project down, claiming they didn't have gangs in East LA. After Baca received advice from a friend that she didn't dream big enough, Baca reexamined the scope of her project. Baca began to plan a city-wide mural project: “This is going to be a way that we can organize people in every community. It’s going to be about Blacks in South Central Los Angeles painting. It’s going to be about Chicanos in East Los. It’s going to be about Filipinos in Echo Park. It’s going to be about the Japanese in Little Tokyo. And that’s exactly what happened.”

Judy Baca was hired by the United States Army Corps of Engineers to help improve the area around a San Fernando Valley flood control channel called the Tujunga Wash. It's essentially a ditch that contained a large concrete retaining wall. Her idea for a mural was to paint a history of the city of Los Angeles, but not the version found in history books. The events that were overlooked were the ones that interested her. "It was an excellent place to bring youth of varied ethnic backgrounds from all over the city to work on an alternate view of the history of the U.S. which included people of color who had been left out of American history books." Baca also said the defining metaphor of the mural would be that "It is a tattoo on the scar where the river once ran."

Baca was inspired by Los tres Grandes ("The Three Greats"), a novel about three of the most influential Mexican muralists: Diego Rivera, David Alfaro Siqueiros, and José Clemente Orozco. In 1977 she attended a workshop at the Taller Siqueiros in Cuernavaca, Mexico, to learn muralism techniques and see their murals in person. Even though all three were deceased by that time, she was able to work with some of Siqueiros' former students.

When she returned and began this project, Baca made the explicit decision to involve people from the community that represented voices that have been historically marginalized. At the beginning of the mural project in 1976, Baca, with funding through the Comprehensive Employment and Training Act (CETA), began work with nine other artists, five historians, and 80 young people who had been referred to the program by the criminal justice department. For Baca, the project was about more than just painting a mural, but rather about investing in the community in ways that had not been done before. Baca took the lead on the project by interviewing people about their lives, family histories, ancestry, and stories they remembered hearing from their older relatives, as well as consulting history experts. From this, she was able to create the design for the mural. Some of the events portrayed in the mural constituted the first time they had ever been displayed in public, including but not limited to the Dust Bowl Journey, Japanese American internment during World War II, Zoot Suit Riots, and the Freedom Bus Rides.

Baca wanted the project to be done by people who were as diverse as those to be painted. Baca states that "I draw on skills not normally used by artists. I've learned as much as I've taught from the youth I've had the good fortune to know by working alongside of them". In this way, although the term artivism had not yet been coined at the time of this project, by focusing on the process and involving the community in creating public art work that shared the histories of marginalized people; Judy Baca was engaging in an artivist project. Working with young people was important for Baca because she noticed that many of them who were involved in gangs were also using graffiti to express themselves and claim territory. Baca felt that muralism was one way to redirect these young people's energy and build community through positive experiences.

Even though Baca made a lot of progress in building community with gang involved young people, she struggled with how gendered muraling projects and spaces were. Most of the young people she worked with were young men because as Baca stated "at that time, boys were the only ones parents would allow". But Baca also found that there was hostility towards the idea of women in these public spaces and to feminist ideals in general. Because of this, when it came to the Great Wall of LA project, Baca began to actively work to connect to other feminist artists and to actively recruit young women to participate in her muraling projects.

She had people from all different ages and backgrounds participate. Some were scholars and artists, but the majority were just community members. "Making a mural is like a big movie production, it can involve 20 sets of scaffolding, four trucks, and food for 50 people." 400 people came out to help paint the mural, which took seven summers to complete, and was finished in 1984. By the end of the project, the mural measured half a mile (0.80 km) in length, and had provided over 400 people with employment and leadership development opportunities. Although the original project called for a mural that represented a history of California from the days of the dinosaurs to the year 1910, Baca instead kept the project going, adding about 350 feet (110 m) to the mural each year. While the mural has grown to 2,754 feet (839 m) in length, the mural is not yet complete. The project is proposed to continue until the mural reaches about a one mile (1.6 km) in length so that it may portray not only contemporary times, but also a vision of the future.

== Teaching career ==
Baca began teaching at her alma mater, Bishop Alemany High School. She taught a program known as Allied Arts, which combined many artistic disciplines, and created her first mural project with those students. Baca was fired after she was involved in public protests against the Vietnam war. At UC Irvine, Baca was an assistant professor from 1981 to 1989, associate professor from 1990 to 1991, and named professor in the Studio Arts Department in 1992. She chaired the Studio Arts Department from 1986 to 1987, and was on the UC Irvine faculty until 1995.

In 1995, she implemented the Muralist Training Workshop to teach people the techniques she had picked up. She also served as a professor at California State University, Monterey Bay from 1994 to 1996, where she co-founded the Visual & Public Arts Institute Department. In 1996 Baca moved to University of California, Los Angeles (UCLA) and took on multiple roles. In 1993, she co-founded UCLA's Cesar Chavez Center for Interdisciplinary Studies, an institution for which she serves as vice chair. In 1998, she served as a master artist in residence with the Role of the Arts in Civic Dialogue at Harvard University.

Judy Baca has been teaching art in the UC system for just over 28 years, 15 of those years have been at the UCLA Caesar E. Chavez Department of Chicana/o Studies. In 2002 she was joint appointed to the World Arts and Cultures department, and in 2010 she was named a professor (VIII) in both departments. In 2018, Baca retired from the UCLA faculty.

=== Workshops ===
- Stockholm Conference: Community Mural Art and Social Change An international exploration of collective Mural Art as a tool to raise unheard voices."
- Toronto Mural Workshop, April 10, 2015
- Emancipation Workshop: April 10, 2015

== Recent and current projects ==
In March 2010, Baca was part of a mural project in the East Bay, Northern California, the Richmond Mural Project, a five panel mural that featured different themes in each panel. The goal of the project was to connect the citizens, and share their wildly diverse backgrounds. She was also part of a group that successfully preserved her mural, Danza Indigenas, in Baldwin Park, after there were violent protests and vandalism towards the artwork. Baca has also had a huge part in the group Mural Rescue Program, which is a program that works to restore, preserve/stabilize, and conserve murals (both painted and digital) that have been painted or printed on substrates and walls built in public environments. One of Baca's most recent and ongoing projects is "New Codex-Oaxaca-Immigration and Cultural Memory" this project is about sharing artwork and stories of those who are immigrating from Mexico (namely Oaxaca) to the US; why they are immigrating, what they are leaving behind, what's happening to make them leave, etc. Baca is involved in choosing the art pieces that are being displayed, community outreach to help come up with ways for these immigrants to have a stable outcome, and getting a conversation started in the community, using these immigrants' artwork.

She was interviewed for the 2010 film !Women Art Revolution.

In 2024, her work was included in Xican-a.o.x. Body a scholarly organized group exhibition on the contributions and experiences of Chicano artists to the art historical canon. The show was first installed at the Cheech Marin Center for Chicano Art & Culture at the Riverside Art Museum, California, and later traveled to the Pérez Art Museum Miami, Florida. The show was curated by Cecilia Fajardo-Hill, Marissa Del Toro, and Gilbert Vicario, and the accompanying catalog was published by the Chicago University Press.

== Criticism ==
In February 2026, the Los Angeles Times reported that multiple former SPARC employees had accused Baca of misusing a major grant from the Mellon Foundation for personal benefit. The specific allegations included using SPARC staff and Mellon grant–funded labor for her private business; large increases in her salary after the Mellon grant arrived; blurring the line between SPARC work and her private art practice; allowing SPARC's city‑owned building to be used for private, for‑profit purposes; and favoring her own exhibitions in SPARC programming. Baca was also criticized for profiting from the sale of The Great Wall of Los Angeles archives to the Lucas Museum of Narrative Art. Baca and SPARC denied all accusations of wrongdoing.

== Publications ==
- Baca, Judy (1995). "Whose Monument Where". In Lacy, Suzanne (ed.). Mapping the Terrain: New Genre Public Art. Seattle: Bay Press. ISBN 9780941920308.
- Baca, Judy (2009). "Here to Stay: Public Art and Sustainability: Public Memory". Public Art Review. 20 (2): 28–29.

== Notable works ==
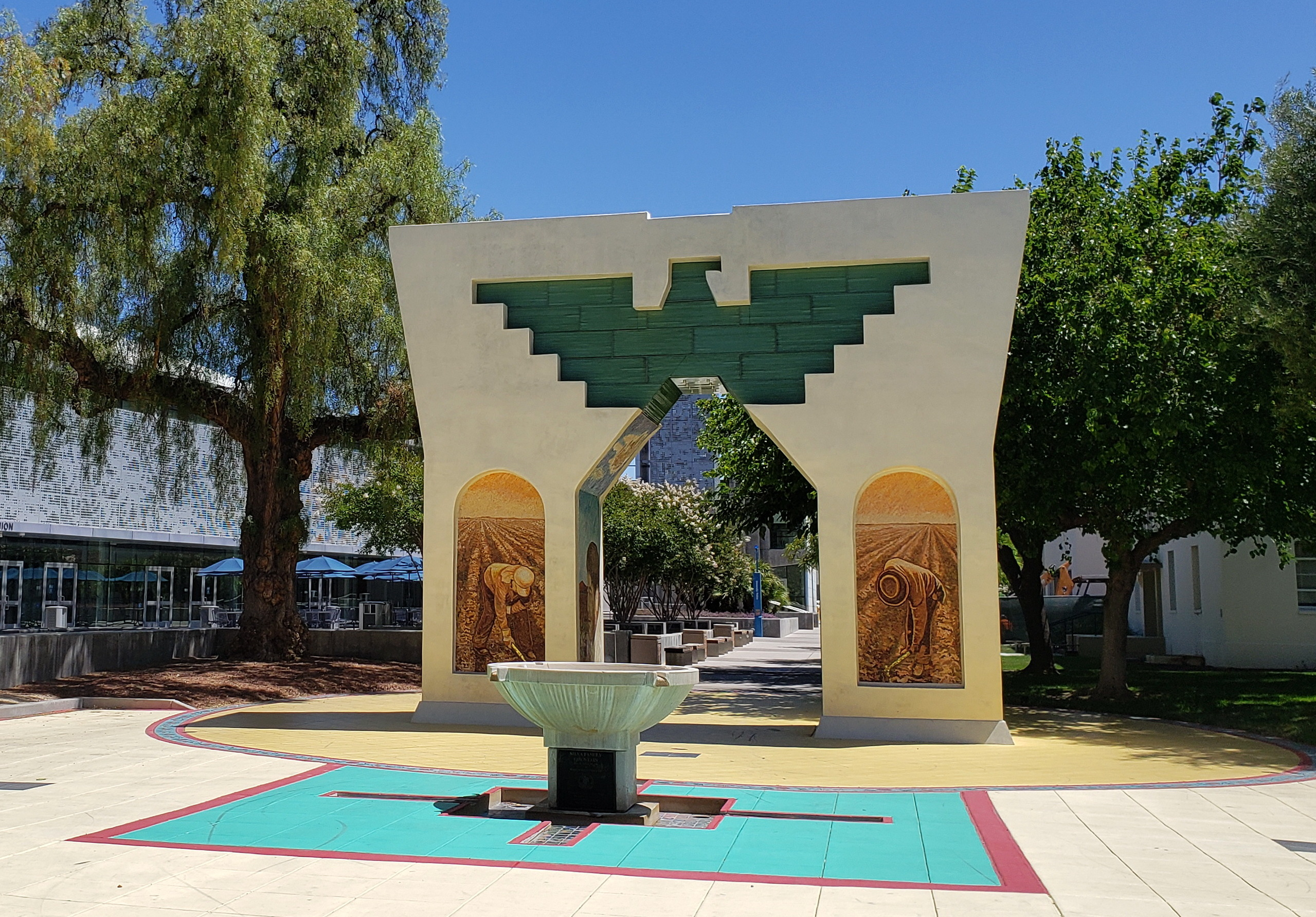
The Arch of Dignity, Equality, and Justice at San José State University.

- Mi Abuelita, 1970, Hollenbeck Park, Los Angeles, California
- Great Wall of Los Angeles, 1976–present, Van Nuys, California
- History of Unitarianism, 1981, First Unitarian Church of Los Angeles, Los Angeles, California
- Danza Indigenas, 1994, Metrolink, maintained by Amtrak, Baldwin Park, California
- La Memoria de Nuestra Tierra, 1996,University of Southern California.
- Memoria de Nuestra Tierra, 2001, Denver Colorado, Denver international airport
- Digital tile murals, 2000, City of Los Angeles, Venice Beach, California
- Migration of the Golden People, 2002, Central American Research and Education Center of Los Angeles
- Arch of Dignity, Equality, and Justice, 2008, San Jose State University, San Jose, California
- Danza de la Tierra, 2009, Dallas Latino Cultural Center, Dallas, Texas
- Ataco, El Salvador Murals, 2009 Invited by the US embassy, Ataco, El Salvador
- Tiny Ripples of Hope'' and ''Seeing Through Others Eyes, 2010, Robert F. Kennedy Memorial Ambassador Hotel, Los Angeles, California
- La Gente del Maiz, 2011, Miguel Contreras Learning Complex, Los Angeles, CA
- The Extroardinary Ordinary People, 2013, Richmond Civic Center, Richmond, CA
- Find Your True Voice, 2013 Sandra Cisneros Learning Academy, Los Angeles, CA

== See also ==
- Baca Family of New Mexico
- Murals of Los Angeles

== General references ==
- "Artist, Curator & Critic Interviews: Judith Baca". !Women Art Revolution – Spotlight at Stanford. 2018.
- Baca, Judith F. “Whose Monument Where? Public Art in a Many-Cultured Society.” Chicano and Chicana Art, 2019, 304–9. doi:10.1215/9781478003403-041.
- "Curriculum Vitae." Judy Baca Artist. N.p., n.d. Web. 4 June 2015. http://www.judybaca.com/artist/curriculum-vitae/.
- Doss, Erika. “Raising Community Consciousness with Public Art: Contrasting Projects by Judy Baca and Andrew Leicester.” American Art 6, no. 1 (1992): 63–81. JSTOR 3109047.
- Indych-López, Anna. Judith F. Baca. Chicano Studies Research Center, 2018. ISBN 978-0-89551-160-7
- Feland: Modern Curriculum Press, 1994. ISBN 0-8136-5276-6.
- Hammond, Harmony. Lesbian art in America: a contemporary history. New York: Rizzoli, 2000. ISBN 0-8478-2248-6.
- Hilderbrand, Lucas. 2018. “The Worlds Los Angeles Maricóns and Malfloras Made.” X-Tra: Contemporary Art Quarterly 20 (4): 22–35.
- Las Mujeres: Mexican American/Chicana women: photographs and biographies of seventeen women from the Spanish colonial period to the present. Windsor: National Women's History Project, 1995. ISBN 0-938625-34-9.
- Mercado, Juan Pablo (2018). Judy Baca, SPARC and a Chicana Mural Movement: Reconstructing U.S. History through Public Art (Dissertation). Los Angeles: University of California.
- Olmstead, Mary (2005). Judy Baca. Chicago, Ill.: Raintree. ISBN 978-1-4109-0709-7. LCCN 2003024764. OCLC 1150066943.
- Telgen, Diane, and Jim Kamp, editors. Latinas! : women of achievement. Detroit: Visible Ink Press, 1996. ISBN 0-7876-0883-1.
