= Chinese labor in the southern United States =

After slavery was abolished in the United States, Chinese laborers were imported to the South as cheap labor to replace freed Blacks on the plantations. Many of the early Chinese laborers came from sugar plantations in Cuba and after the transcontinental railroad was completed, California also contributed to the labor supply. These laborers formed communities in the pockets of the Southeastern part of the United States, encountering racist policies and crossing paths with the African American community.

== Reconstruction and the labor problem ==
In the mid-late 19th century, Southern planters argued that because of the American Civil War and Reconstruction policies, there wasn't a sufficient labor pool to maintain the plantations. Post-emancipation, freed Blacks demanded higher wages and migrated to rejoin families broken apart by slavery. In response, Southern planters argued that Black laborers were unreliable and unstable and implemented Black codes with labor provisions that would limit the mobility of Black people.

Starting as early as 1865, Southern newspapers began printing editorials and letters calling for Chinese labor to be the new labor supply. This interest was sparked in part by accounts boasting that the Chinese contract labor attributed to the increase in Cuban agricultural imports. The Chinese effectively became the new labor supply but were positioned societally at the same level as African Americans.

The importation of Chinese labor to the South did not happen overnight. In February 1866, R.S. Chilton, the commissioner of U.S. immigration argued in his report to Congress that under the 1862 act prohibiting coolie trade, importation of Chinese labor to the South should be prohibited and southerners should instead work out contracts with freed Blacks. However, because the commissioner associated Chinese immigration as "involuntary" immigration, southern publications and advocates of importing Chinese labor found a loophole by arguing that Chinese laborers were "voluntary" and had left Cuba after their eight-year contracts expired-.

== See also ==
- Lum v. Rice
- Chinatowns in the United States
- Hop Sing (Bonanza)
