= Wilma Cannon Fairbank =

American art historian, artist, and diplomat

- Born: Wilma Denio Cannon; April 23, 1909; Cambridge, Massachusetts, U.S.
- Died: April 4, 2002 (age 92); Cambridge, Massachusetts, U.S.
- Occupations: Art historian, Chinese studies scholar, diplomat
- Spouse: John King Fairbank
- Parent(s): Walter Bradford Cannon and Cornelia James Cannon
- Relatives: Marian Cannon Schlesinger (sister); Bradford Cannon (brother); Arthur M. Schlesinger Jr. (brother-in-law); Christina Schlesinger (niece); Stephen Schlesinger (nephew); Ida Maud Cannon (aunt)

Wilma Denio Cannon Fairbank (April 23, 1909 – April 4, 2002) (Chinese: 费慰梅 Fei Weimei) was an American artist, scholar of Chinese art and architecture, and diplomat. Her scholarship on the Han dynasty Wu Liang tombs, which she started in the early 1930s, was pioneering and influential in emphasizing artistic and architectural rather than approaches that emphasized the iconography. Following World War Two she served as cultural officer in the American Embassy in China, and in the 1950s she continued research and published articles, reviews, and translations. She was an organizer and founding member of the Far Eastern Association, which became the Association for Asian Studies.

Her husband, John King Fairbank, was an historian of modern China. She was a member of the Institute for Research in Chinese Architecture. After her husband became a professor at Harvard University, she was a faculty wife and mother, which she later called "a terrific drop in status".

In 2002 she died in the Cambridge house where she had lived for more than fifty years, a fifteen-minute walk from the Cambridge house where she was born.

== Early life and education ==
Wilma Cannon was born in Cambridge, Massachusetts, the eldest child of Walter Bradford Cannon and Cornelia James Cannon. Both of her parents were notable. Her father was a professor of physiology at Harvard Medical School, who saw medicine as a profession of social service, and her mother a Radcliffe graduate, feminist activist, writer, and novelist who travelled the country to support progressive causes, especially women's rights. Her sister Marian Cannon Schlesinger became an artist and writer, and married historian Arthur M. Schlesinger Jr. Their brother Bradford Cannon was a reconstructive surgeon who specialized in treating burns.

Her parents, together with her mother's sisters, Bernice Cannon, and Ida Maud Cannon, maintained the family house at 2 Divinity Avenue (later the site of the Harvard-Yenching Library), which became a center for progressive intellectual and social activism. Ida was Chief of Social Service at Massachusetts General Hospital and a community activist. in 1929–1930, Her mother, Cornelia, took the family on a three-month tour of Europe.

After graduating from Cambridge Latin School, Cannon entered Radcliffe College, graduating in 1931 (she did some graduate work there from 1937 to 1939). She was already a serious painter when she entered, and began a major in fine arts. During her second year she took a course on Chinese art offered by the French sinologist Paul Pelliot and in her senior year a course on the arts of China and Japan given by Langdon Warner. She was intrigued when Warner showed the rubbings taken from portrait stones in the Wu Family Temple of the Eastern Han Dynasty in Jiaxiang, Shandong. Only later, however, did she read Mission Archéologique dans la Chine Septentrionale (Paris, 1913) by Édouard Chavannes, which presented the existing scholarship on the temples and which she referred to as the "bible of Chinese art". She recalled that "Pelliot's bookish erudition and Warner's artistic sensibility together kindled my own enthusiastic interest in Chinese art."

On Valentine's Day, 1929 she met John Fairbank, then a senior at Harvard College, who would become a prominent historian of China. After his graduation, John went to begin his professional study of China in England at University of Oxford on a Rhodes Scholarship. Since the scholarship did not allow recipients to be married, the couple carried on a long-distance courtship. After graduating from Radcliffe with a bachelor's degree in Fine Arts in 1931, Wilma went to Mexico, where she studied and worked with the avant-garde painter Diego Rivera, whose bold forms and use of color greatly affected her own painting.

== Life in China ==
In summer 1932, she sailed to China, where she and Fairbank were married in July. The Japanese Army had established control of Northeast China, but Beiping, as Beijing, the former capital, was then known, was relatively safe. The couple lived in an old-style courtyard house in a neighborhood that was home to Chinese intellectuals, Western graduate students, and scholars of Chinese culture and history. They found the old culture still vibrant but eager to change. She filled the house with her paintings and drawings. Their neighbors included Chinese progressive intellectuals and Western future scholars and journalists. Their many visitors included her sister Marion. Among their neighbors were Lin Huiyin, the first woman in modern China to become an architect, and her husband, Liang Sicheng, a pioneering historian of Chinese architecture, whose late father, Liang Qichao, had been one of China's best-known intellectual reformers. She struck up a quick and deep friendship with Huiyin and Sicheng, who gave Wilma and John Chinese names. John's was Fei Zhengqing, "Fei" being a common family name, and "Zhengqing", meaning "upright and clear". Hers was "Weimei", which means "comforting plum."

The former capital was full of antique shops, museums, and art dealers, but ink rubbings were still the least expensive way for a student to acquire art. She found rubbings from the Wuliang shrines that Warner had introduced her to in his undergraduate lectures. Scholars had known the murals only through the rubbings, which were studied as illustrations of ancient mythology.

By 1934 her spoken Chinese was good enough that she and a friend could visit the site of the tombs. The mural slabs had been excavated in the eighteenth century and placed in no particular order inside a small building, some engraved on one side only, some front and back, some front and side. She later wrote that "after a long walk across the village-dotted plain ... I entered the dark building which housed the slabs and saw inset in the walls the many gable-topped stones, the various border patterns which matched from slab to slab..., I could see at once that these were constituent parts of buildings." She thought: "might it be possible to reconstruct them and set this jumble to rights? This impulse, which I can only describe as housewifely, gripped me forcibly that day and returned to haunt me in the months and years that followed."

== Scholarship and return to Cambridge ==
After the couple returned to Cambridge in 1936, John Fairbank joined the Harvard Department of History and Wilma Cannon Fairbank developed the research she had begun in China. She also helped to organize and administer the Far Eastern Association, which later became the Association for Asian Studies.

=== The Wuliang Shrines ===
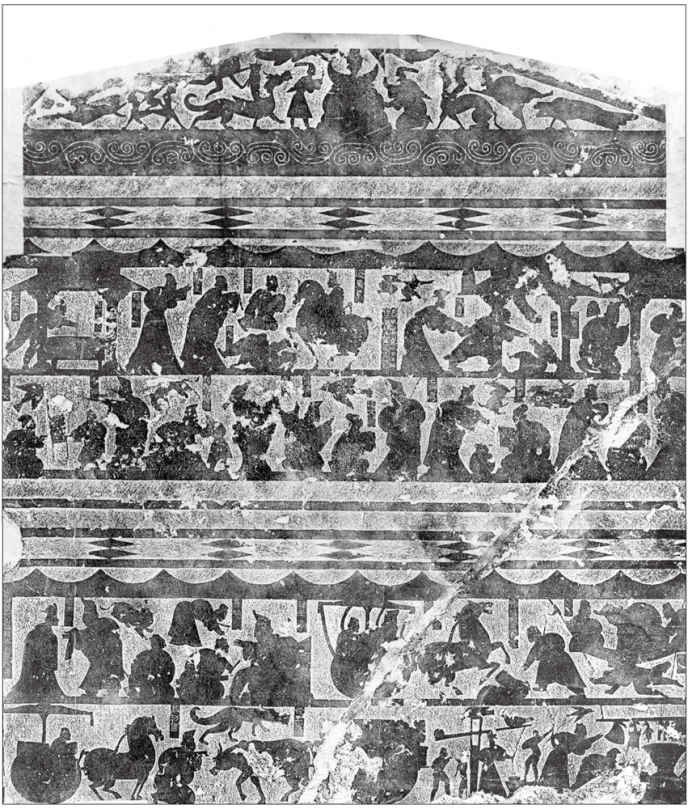
武梁祠第二石

Fairbank began her study by assembling a full set of rubbings, then had high quality photographs made of them at a uniform scale, and moved them around on a table like a jigsaw puzzle. Senior scholars had warned that a reconstruction would be clearer and more complete than the originals, which turned out to be true, since the stones had been repeatedly soaked in ink and rubbed away over the centuries. Local entrepreneurs and literati treated them as "lithographic stones," that is, stones from which prints were taken for sale. What her "desk-bound colleagues," as she later called them, did not realize was that the tablets were in fact architectural elements on which engravings had been made. Using her paper reproductions, she reconstructed the original configuration of the temple. At John's urging, she put her findings into an article, which she submitted the Harvard Journal of Asiatic Studies. Her first effort was published there in 1941, and over the next few years she published several more there.

In addition she pointed out that the walls of tombs were constructed of bricks, which influenced the pictorial methods. Potters could stamp a design on any number of bricks and assemble elaborate patterns, which led to superimposed friezes and division into panels, rather than creating an illusion of continuous pictorial space.

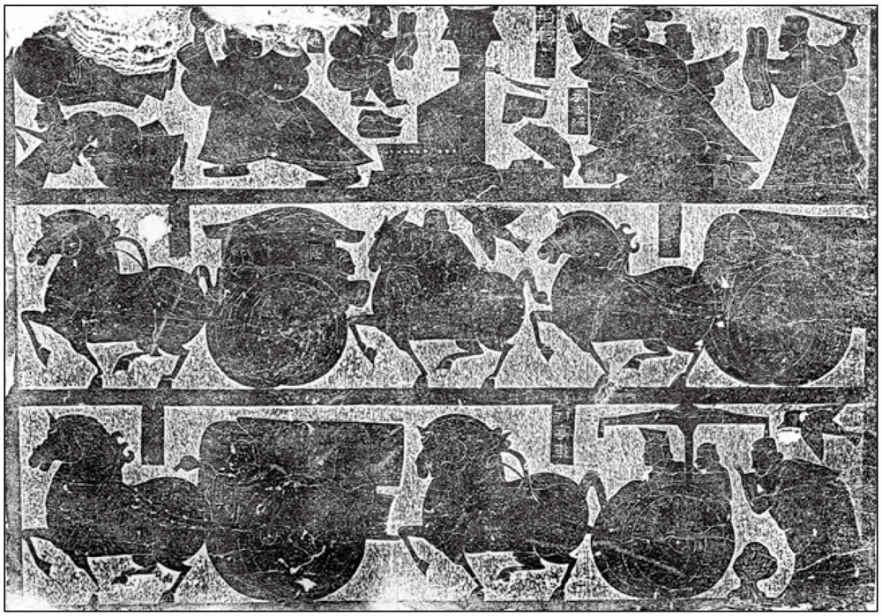
武梁祠前石室第十一石

== Wartime government service ==
In 1941 the couple moved to Washington, D.C. to participate in the war effort. Mortimer Graves of The American Council of Learned Societies commissioned her to write a report that was published as "Organizations in America Concerned with China". She became the first employee in the China section of the State Department's Cultural Relations Division, and supervised programs in cultural and academic exchange. In May 1945, she returned to China to spend two years as the Chief Cultural Officer in the American Embassy in Chongqing, and later in Nanjing. In Chongqing she re-united with the Liangs, although their poverty was shocking and Huiyin suffered from tuberculosis. At that time she investigated more than a dozen Han dynasty cliff tombs along the Min river, in Sichuan, in collaboration with Wolfgang Franke, the German sinologist, who made a set of careful rubbings.

== Postwar career ==
After returning to Cambridge in 1947, she continued to publish articles, and continued her volunteer work with the Far Eastern Association. The Fairbanks adopted two daughters. The United Nations Educational, Scientific and Cultural Organization (UNESCO) commissioned her to write a report, which was issued as "Chinese Educational Needs And Programs Of U.S-Located Agencies To Meet Them". During this time, she also researched and wrote papers on Chinese education and technical training of Asian students in the United States; served as secretary for the newly founded Far Eastern Association in 1948 and 1949; and organized and conducted a weekly radio program, “The World and You,” sponsored by the Boston World Affairs Council from 1950 to 1952.

When the Fairbanks visited Japan in 1952, she collaborated with Masao Kitano, a scholar at Kyoto University, who had investigated Eastern Han tomb murals in Beiyuan, Liaoyang, in Liaoning. Since she did not speak Japanese and Kitano did not Speak English, they communicated in Chinese.

In the 1960s she turned her attention to Shang and Zhou dynasty ritual bronzes and casting technology. Since the 1930s, the consensus had been that the Shang artisans had used the so-called lost wax process. This technique involved carving a wax model, which was covered with clay, forming a mold. When the mold was baked, the wax melts out, that is, is "lost," to be replaced with molten metal. But Fairbank disagreed. A review of the field said “the observation that turned the tide against lost-wax casting” was Fairbank's 1962 “short paper of fundamental importance” arguing that the bronzes were cast in pieces, then assembled and fired. Once again, her artists's sense was that technique and design go together. She pointed out that “the Shang moldmaker's technique is openly announced by his designs.”

The Fairbank university home at 41 Winthrop Street, just south of Harvard Square, became a center for colleagues, students, and visiting scholars. Thursday afternoon teas featured Lipton's tea and cucumber sandwiches. In the late 1940s, the liberal Chinese political scientist, Qian Duansheng, lived in a second floor bedroom.

== Influence and reception ==
At her death in 2002, Wu Hung, a specialist in the area, wrote of her 1941 article on the Wu Liangci offering shrines "revolutionized the study of Han pictorial art by redefining the subject and 'frame' of observation and interpretation". He went on that "Combining an artist's eye and instincts with the extraordinary analytical mind of a scholar, she reexamined other major issues in early Chinese art history, devising an approach that still guides some major research projects on ancient Chinese bronzes."

Her 1972 volume, Adventures In Retrieval: Han Murals And Shang Bronze Molds reprinted her articles, with an extensive preface. Reviewers commented on their pioneering originality, though noting that the field had developed since they were first published. The British art historian William Watson wrote that "Mrs. Fairbank brings to her task the customary and intermittently fruitful concern of American scholarship with aesthetic analysis, complementing Chavanne’s elucidation of the literary and mythological content”. Watson went on that Fairbank made a number of points "that were original at the time and are still acceptable."

Her wartime service was the basis of the America’s Cultural Experiment In China, 1942-1949, published by the State Department in 1976, which described and evaluated the programs run by the American State Department in China. The historian of Chinese science, Joseph Needham, who had known her during the war, wrote that "in this book the distinguished expert on Han art, Wilma Fairbank", presents "a valuable history from which there is a great deal to learn" though adding that it did not discuss parallel British efforts.

Her 1992 biography of the Liangs, Liang And Lin: Partners In Exploring China's Architectural Past, was quickly translated into Chinese. The New York Times review wrote "In her modest and straightforward way, Wilma Fairbank, who is the only person alive who could have written this story, has created an affecting portrait of the final years of an epoch, when Old China faded away and New China took its place." He added, however, that "for one brief moment her portrait is too ideal," for only in passing does she mention Liang's support for the anti-Rightist campaigns of the 1957.

== Publications ==
Fairbank's work appeared in academic journals including The Far Eastern Quarterly, Harvard Journal of Asiatic Studies, and Artibus Asiae.

=== Articles ===
- Fairbank, Wilma (1941). "The Offering Shrines of " Wu Liang Tz'ŭ "". Harvard Journal of Asiatic Studies. 6 (1): 1–36. doi:10.2307/2717961. ISSN 0073-0548. JSTOR 2717961.
- Fairbank, Wilma (1942). "A Structural Key to Han Mural Art". Harvard Journal of Asiatic Studies. 7 (1): 52–88. doi:10.2307/2717814. ISSN 0073-0548. JSTOR 2717814.
- (1951) "Han Tomb Art of West China. A Collection of First- and Second-Century Reliefs." Journal of the American Oriental Society 71/ 4: 282–284.
- Fujieda, Akira; Fairbank, Wilma (1953). "Current Trends in Japanese Studies of China and Adjacent Areas". The Far Eastern Quarterly. 13 (1): 37–47. doi:10.2307/2942368. ISSN 0363-6917. JSTOR 2942368.
- Fairbank, Wilma; Kitano, Masao (1954). "Han Mural Paintings in the Pei-Yuan Tomb at Liao-Yang, South Manchuria". Artibus Asiae. 17 (3/4): 238–264. doi:10.2307/3249057. ISSN 0004-3648. JSTOR 3249057.
- "Piece-mold craftsmanship and Shang bronze design" (1962) Arch. Chinese Art Soc. Amer 16 (1962): 8–15.

=== Major reviews ===
- (1962). (Review of Bronze Casting and Bronze Alloys in Ancient China, by N. Barnard). Technology and Culture, 3(2), 178–180. https://doi.org/10.2307/3101442
- (1970) (Review) "The Freer Chinese Bronzes" Harvard Journal of Asiatic Studies 30:240–243.
- (1976) (Review) "The China Hands: America’s Foreign Service Officers and What Befell Them. By E. J. Kahn Jr. (New York: Viking Press, 1975). The China Quarterly 67: 635–636.

=== Reports ===
- Organizations in America Concerned with China, American Council of Learned Societies
- Chinese Educational Needs and Programs of U.S-Located Agencies to Meet Them, United Nations Educational, Scientific and Cultural Organization (UNESCO)

=== Books ===
- Fairbank, Wilma (1972). Adventures in retrieval; Han murals and Shang bronze molds. --. Cambridge, Mass. : Harvard University Press. ISBN 978-0-674-00575-4 – via Internet Archive.
- Fairbank, Wilma (June 1976). America's Cultural Experiment in China, 1942-1949. Cultural Relations Programs of the U.S. Department of State: Historical Studies, Number 1. Superintendent of Documents, U.
- Fairbank, Wilma (1994). Liang and Lin: Partners in Exploring China's Architectural Past. University of Pennsylvania Press. ISBN 978-0-8122-3278-3.

=== Translations ===
- Liang, Sicheng; Fairbank, Wilma (1984). A pictorial history of Chinese architecture: a study of the development of its structural system and the evolution of its types. Cambridge, Mass.: MIT Press. ISBN 978-0-262-12103-3.
