= Ida Maud Cannon =

American social worker (1877–1960)

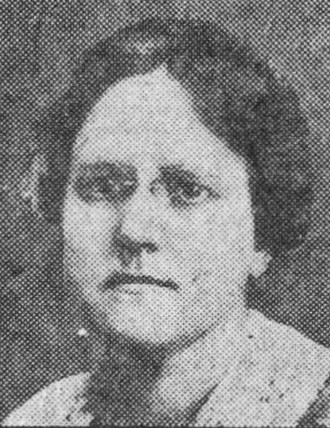
- Ida Maud Cannon, from a 1924 publication
- Born: June 29, 1877; Milwaukee, Wisconsin, U.S.
- Died: July 7, 1960 (aged 83); Watertown, Massachusetts, U.S.
- Occupation: Professor of social work
- Known for: Hospital-based social work

Ida Maud Cannon (June 29, 1877 – July 7, 1960) was an American social worker, who was Chief of Social Service at Massachusetts General Hospital from 1914 to 1945.

== Early life ==
Ida Maud Cannon was born in Milwaukee, Wisconsin, United States, the daughter of Colbert Hanchett Cannon and Sarah Wilma Denio Cannon. Her father worked for the railroad, and later trained and practiced as a homeopathic physician; her mother was a schoolteacher, who died from tuberculosis when Ida was a small child. Cannon was raised in Saint Paul, Minnesota. She trained as a nurse in St. Paul. She pursued further studies at the University of Minnesota and at the Boston School of Social Work.

== Career ==
Cannon worked briefly as a nurse at the State School for the Feeble-minded in Faribault, Minnesota, and was a visiting nurse for St. Paul Associated Charities for three years. In 1907, after her social work education, Richard Clarke Cabot hired her as a social worker at Massachusetts General Hospital. In 1914, she was named Chief of Social Service at the hospital. Through an association with the Russell Sage Foundation, Cannon advocated and lectured nationally for hospital-based social work programs, and developed a standardized curriculum for social work education, based on her combined training as a nurse and a social worker. She taught medical social work in Boston, and wrote a textbook, Social Work in Hospitals (1913), for use in the field.

In 1918 she was one of the founders of the American Association of Hospital Social Workers, and was president of the organization for two terms. In 1932, she was president of the Massachusetts Conference of Social Work; also in the 1930s, she served on the Massachusetts State Commission to Study Health Laws, and attended the White House Conference on Child Health and Protection. During World War II she was an advisor to the Massachusetts State Department of Public Health. She also worked with the Cambridge Anti-Tuberculosis Association and the Boston Society for the Relief & Control of Tuberculosis, and was a trustee of the Massachusetts State Infirmary at Tewksbury. She held honorary doctorates from the University of New Hampshire and Boston University. In 1958, the Massachusetts Public Health Association presented the Lemuel Shattuck Award to Cannon, in recognition of her lifetime of service.

Cannon retired in 1945. In retirement, she wrote On the Social Frontier of Medicine: Pioneering in Medical Social Service (1952), and Some Highlights of Fifty Years: Massachusetts Conference of Social Work, 1903–1953 (1953).

== Personal life and legacy ==
Cannon and her sister Bernice lived in their brother's household in Cambridge, Massachusetts. Walter Bradford Cannon, was a noted physiologist at Harvard Medical School, and his wife was a novelist, Cornelia James Cannon. Through them, Ida Maud Cannon was the aunt of medical researcher Bradford Cannon; Wilma Cannon Fairbank, a scholar of Asian art; and of writer and artist Marian Cannon Schlesinger, and great-aunt of Marian's children, including author Stephen Schlesinger and artist Christina Schlesinger. Cannon moved into a nursing home in 1957, and died in 1960, aged 83 years, in Watertown, Massachusetts.

Papers pertaining to Ida Cannon's life and work are in the Cannon Family Papers, Schlesinger Library, Radcliffe Institute and the Richard Clarke Cabot Papers, Harvard University Archives. There are also Ida Cannon papers at the Massachusetts General Hospital. Since 1971, the Ida M. Cannon Award has been given annually by the American Hospital Association's Society for Social Work Leadership in Health Care. The School of Social Work at the University of Pittsburgh has a Cannon Fellowship Program named for Ida M. Cannon.

== Mary Antoinette Cannon ==
Although they served on boards and committees together, and both worked in medical social work at Massachusetts General Hospital, Ida Maud Cannon and Mary Antoinette Cannon were not related to each other.
