= Robert Schlesinger =

American writer and political commentator

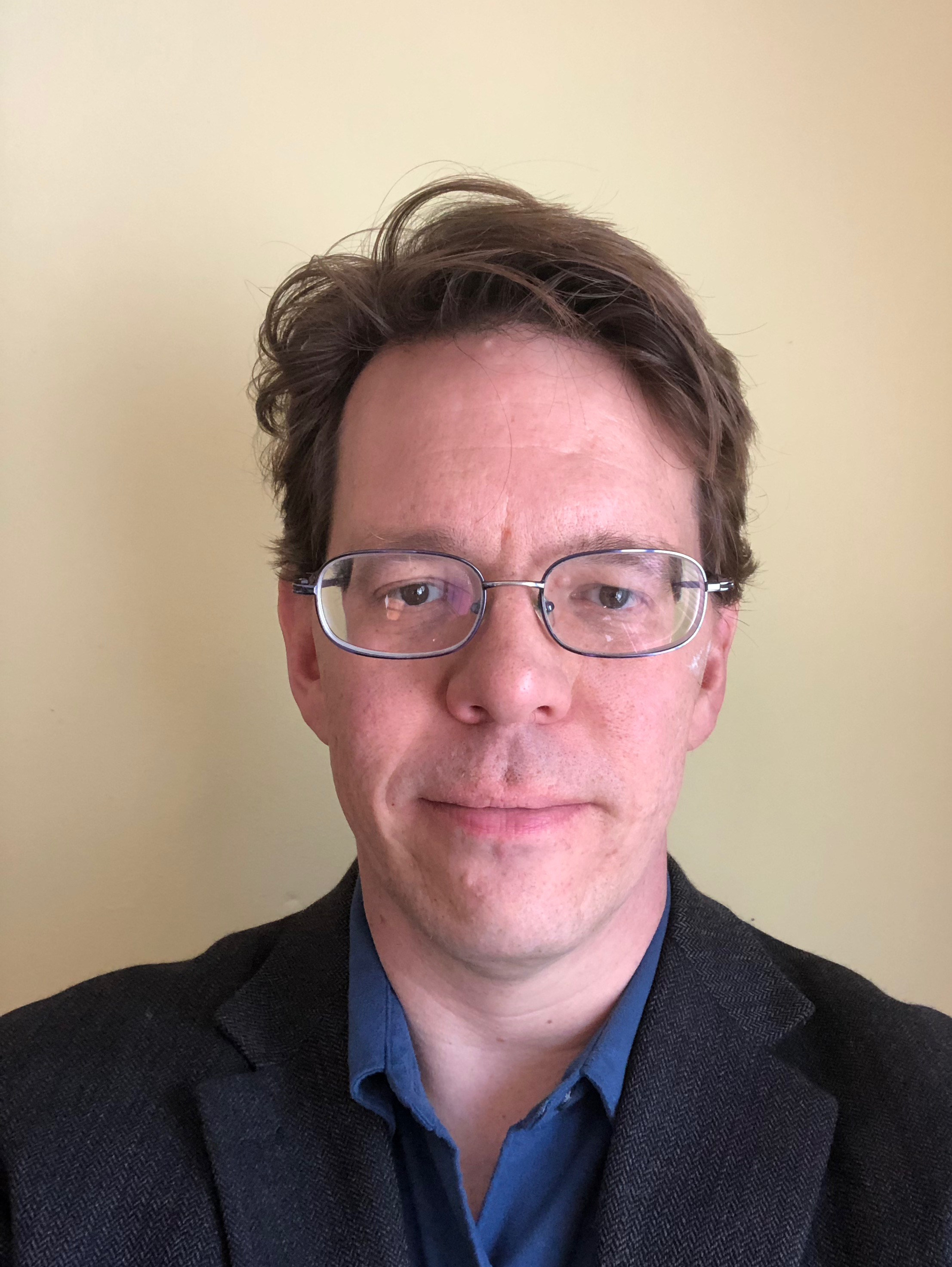

Robert Schlesinger is an American author, editor and liberal commentator emphasizing politics and political communications.

== Biography ==
A native of New York City, he is a graduate of Middlebury College, who lives in Alexandria, Virginia, with his wife and their two sons. He is the youngest son of the late historian Arthur M. Schlesinger Jr. and the brother of Stephen Schlesinger and Christina Schlesinger. He is a descendant of the Irish revolutionaries Robert Emmet (for whom he is named) and Thomas Addis Emmet.

== Professional career ==
Schlesinger has worked at the Center for Public Integrity as a researcher, then at The Hill as a reporter and political editor, at Voter.com as chief congressional correspondent, and as a Washington, DC, reporter for The Boston Globe. He was most recently managing editor for opinion at U.S. News & World Report. After quitting U.S. News, he initiated Schlesinger Communications, a company which specializes in ghostwriting. His book, White House Ghosts: Presidents and Their Speechwriters, was published in 2008. His work has appeared in numerous publications, including NBC News' Think opinion section, The Washington Monthly, The Washington Post The Weekly Standard, People, Mother Jones, The American Conservative and The New Republic among other publications. He cohosted the Bipodisan podcast, along with Jean Card, a Republican former cabinet speechwriter, from 2019 to 2021.
