= Mount Cannon =

Mountain in Montana, United States

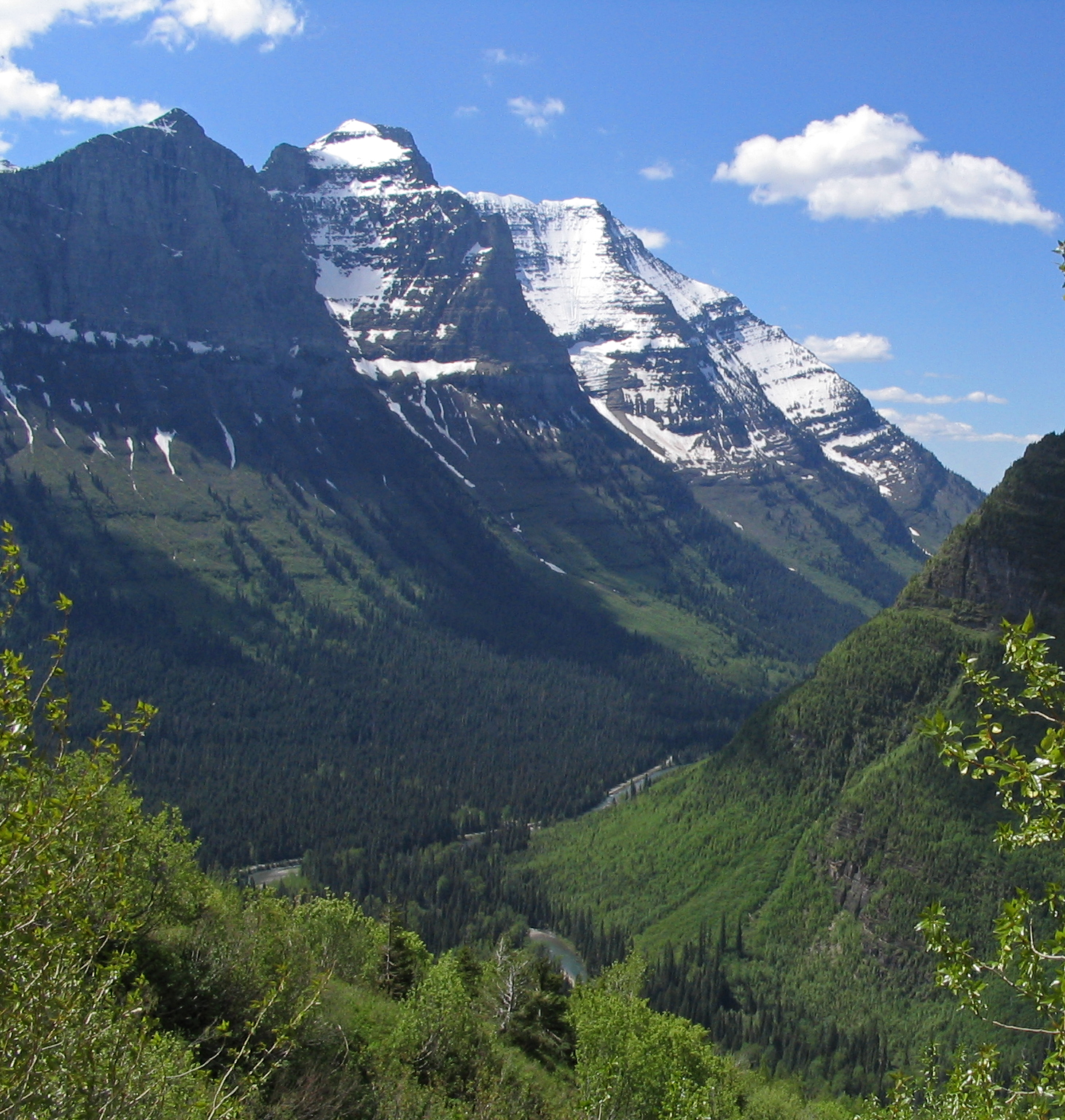
- Mount Cannon seen from Going-to-the-Sun Road

Highest point
- Elevation: 8,956 ft (2,730 m) NAVD 88
- Prominence: 1,792 ft (546 m)
- Coordinates: 48°41′33″N 113°46′27″W

Geography
- Location within Montana Location within the United States
- Location: Flathead County, Montana, U.S.
- Parent range: Lewis Range
- Topo map(s): USGS Mount Cannon, MT

Climbing
- First ascent: 1923 Norman Clyde

Mount Cannon (8,956 feet (2,730 m)) is located in the Lewis Range, Glacier National Park in the U.S. state of Montana. Formerly called Goat Mountain it was renamed for the leading physiologist Dr. Walter Bradford Cannon and his wife Cornelia, who made the first recorded ascent of the mountain in 1901.

== Geology ==
Like other mountains in Glacier National Park, Cannon is composed of sedimentary rock laid down during the Precambrian to Jurassic periods. Formed in shallow seas, this sedimentary rock was initially uplifted beginning 170 million years ago when the Lewis Overthrust fault pushed an enormous slab of precambrian rocks 3 mi (4.8 km) thick, 50 miles (80 km) wide and 160 miles (260 km) long over younger rock of the cretaceous period.

== Climate ==
Based on the Köppen climate classification, Cannon is located in a subarctic climate characterized by long, usually very cold winters, and short, cool to mild summers. Temperatures can drop below −10 °F with wind chill factors below −30 °F.

== Gallery ==
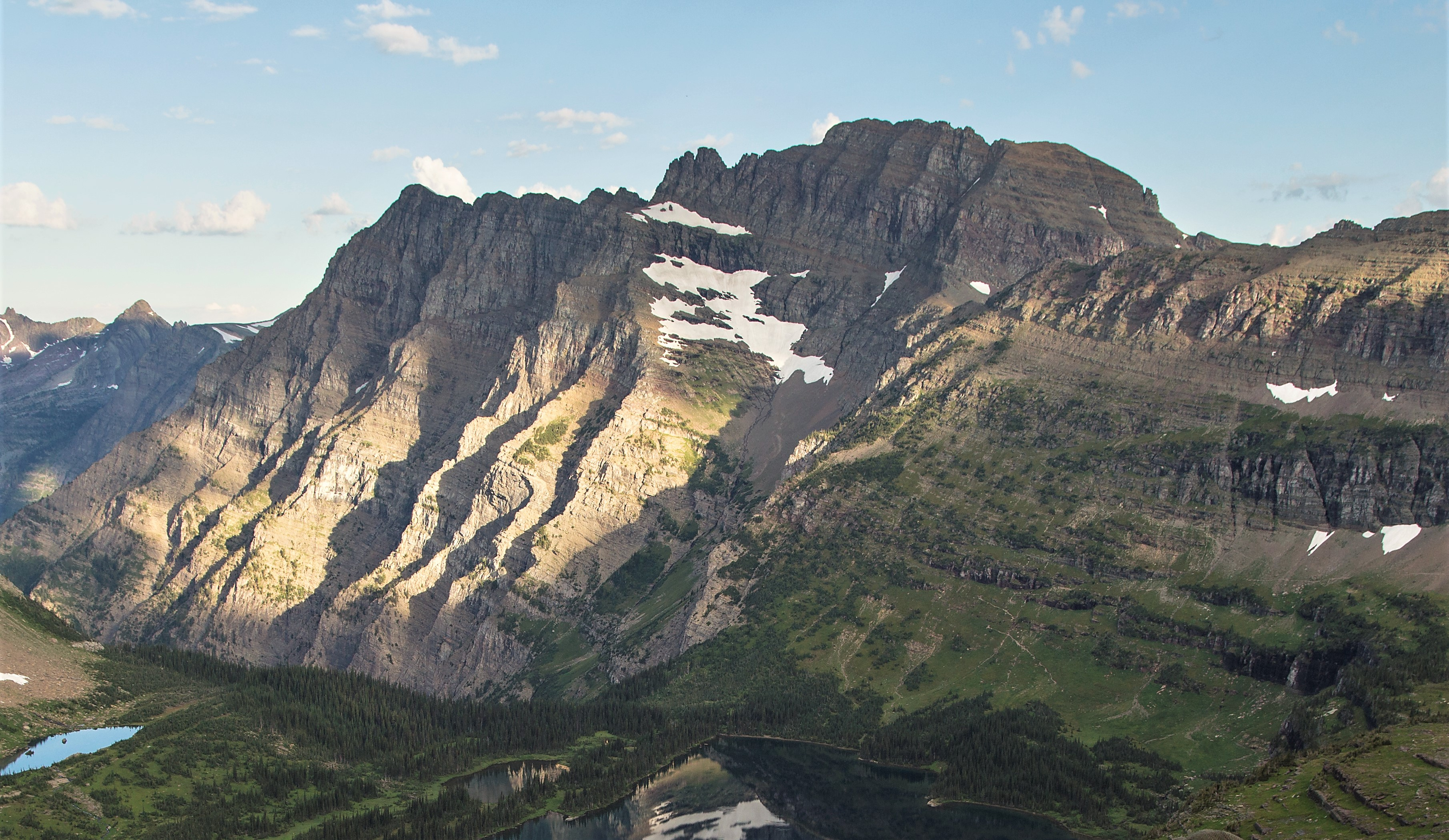
Southeast aspect of Mount Cannon rises above Hidden Lake.

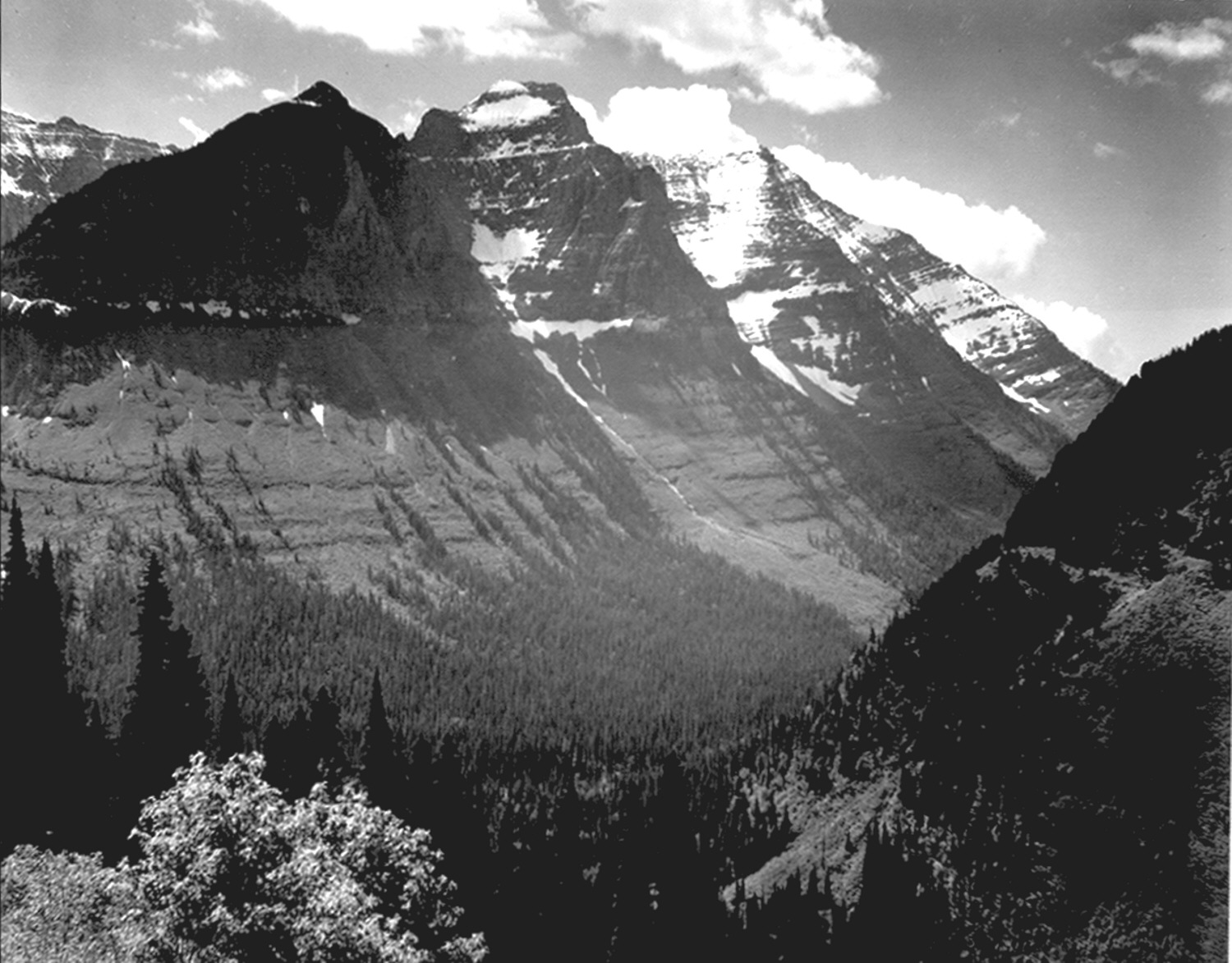
Mount Cannon by Ansel Adams

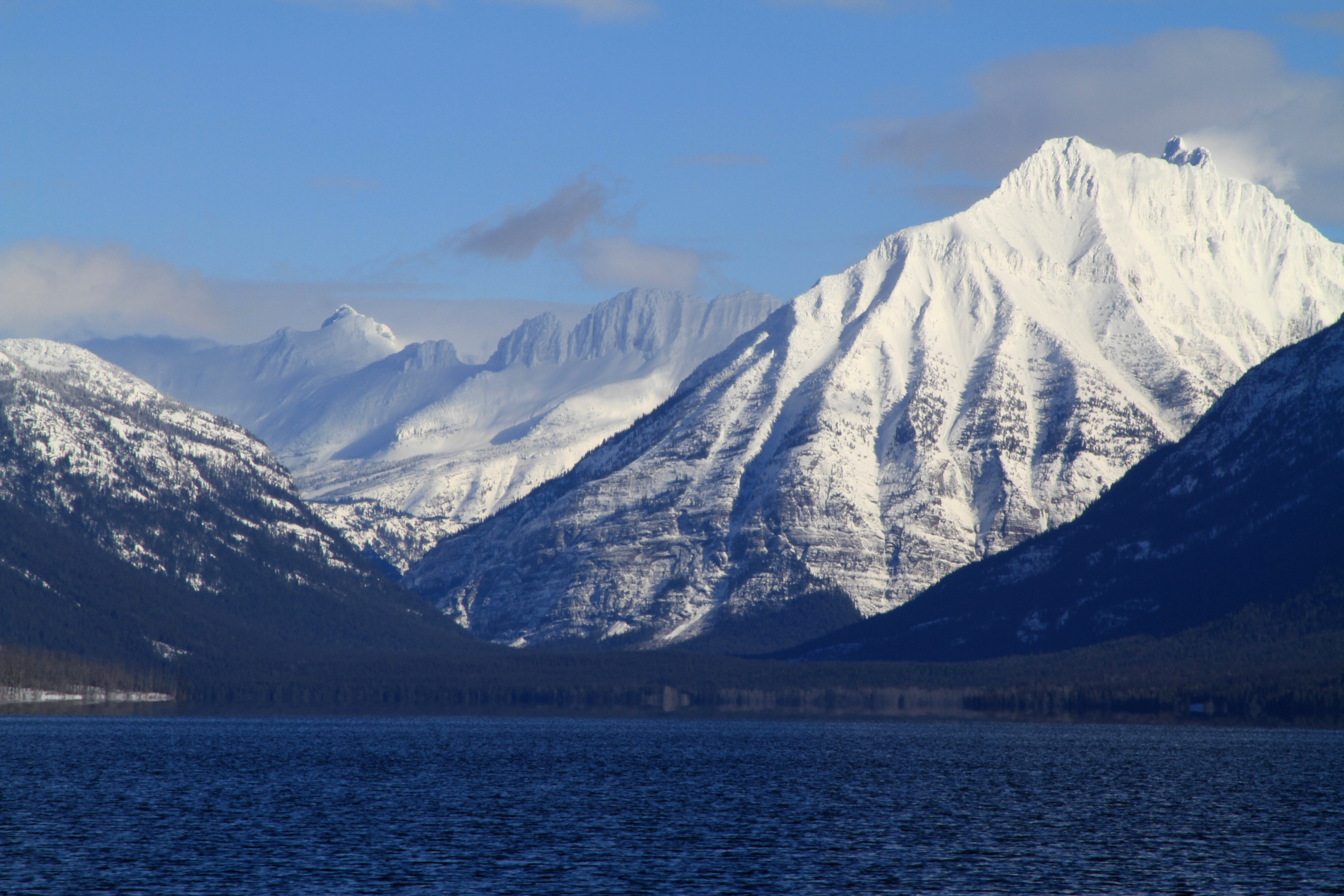
Mount Cannon (right) seen from Lake McDonald

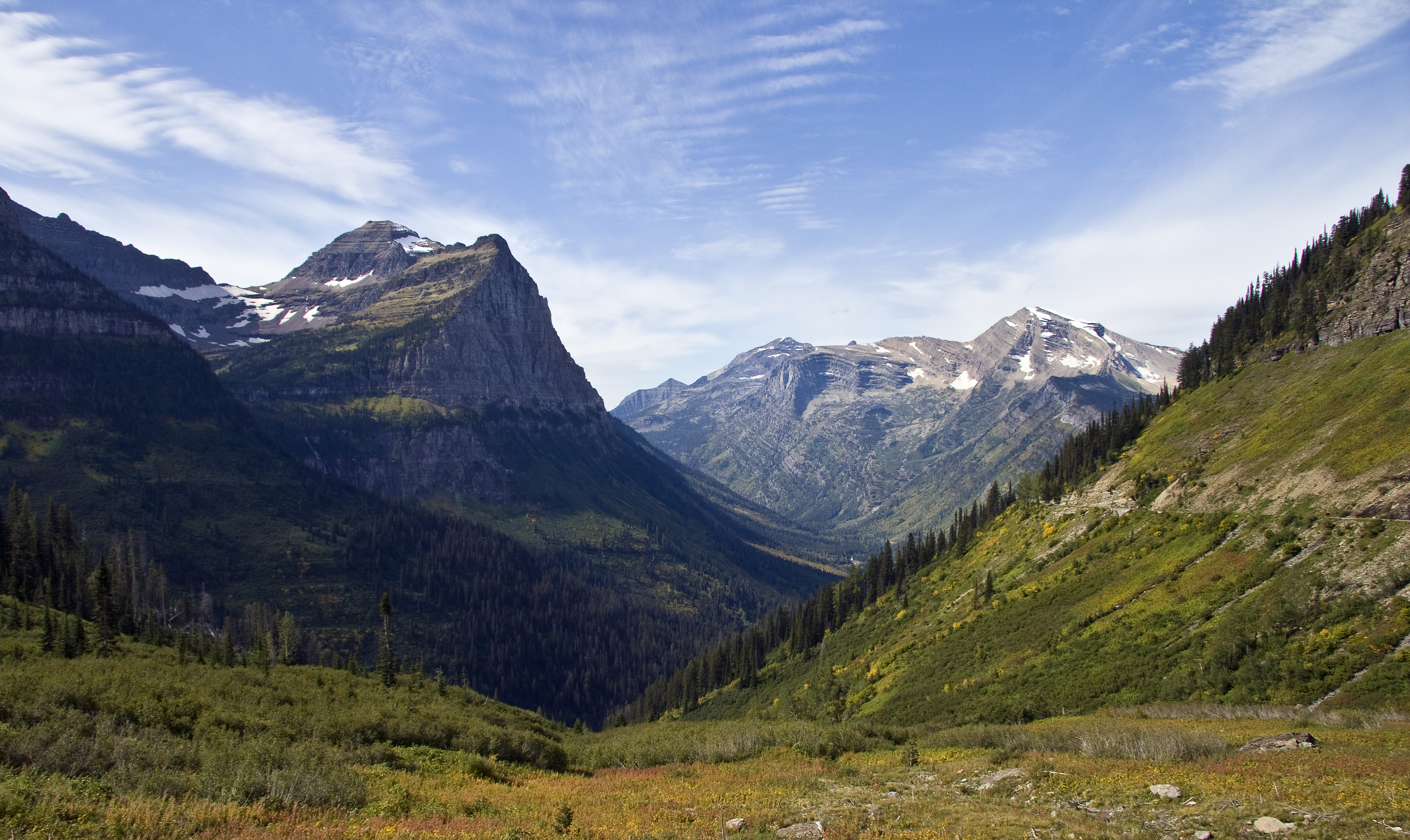
Mount Cannon at center left rises above the McDonald Valley

== See also ==
- Mountains and mountain ranges of Glacier National Park (U.S.)
- Geology of the Rocky Mountains
