= Marian Cannon Schlesinger =

American artist and author (1912–2017)

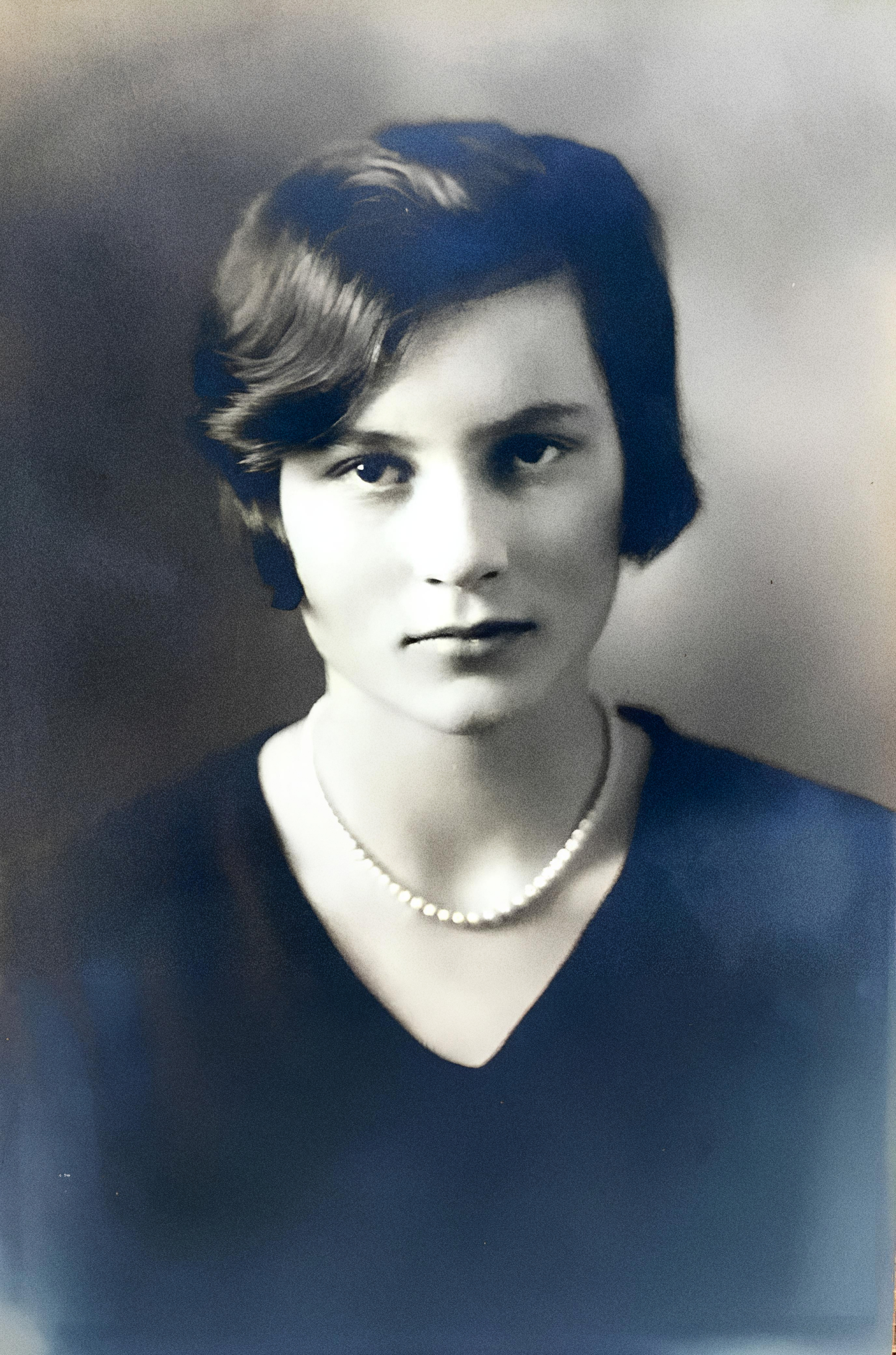
- Schlesinger, c. 1930
- Born: Marian Cannon; September 13, 1912; Franklin, New Hampshire, US
- Died: October 14, 2017 (aged 105); Cambridge, Massachusetts, US
- Education: Radcliffe College
- Occupations: Artist, author
- Spouse: Arthur M. Schlesinger Jr. (1940–1970; divorced)
- Children: 4, including Christiana and Stephen
- Parents: Walter Bradford Cannon (father); Cornelia James Cannon (mother)

Marian Cannon Schlesinger (born Marian Cannon; September 13, 1912 – October 14, 2017) was an American artist and author. From 1940 to 1970, she was the wife of historian Arthur M. Shlesinger Jr., during which she was among John F. Kennedy's circle.

== Biography ==
Schlesinger was born on September 13, 1912, in Franklin, New Hampshire, to physiologist Walter Bradford Cannon and feminist author Cornelia James Cannon. Her siblings included surgeon Bradford Cannon and art historian Wilma Cannon Fairbank. Raised in Cambridge, Massachusetts, she graduated from Radcliffe College in 1934. She travelled from an early age, including three months in Europe at age 17, and living in China for a year alongside her sister Wilma following her graduation from college.

In 1940, Schlesinger married historian Arthur M. Schlesinger Jr., whom she had met at her parents' house during college. They had four children together, including Christina and Stephen Schlesinger. Through her husband, she met John F. Kennedy, whom she endorsed. She and Arthur divorced in 1970, after which Arthur remarried in 1971; Marian never remarried.

Following their divorce, Schlesinger returned to Cambridge, where she worked as an author and painter. She published two volumes of her memoir, Snatched from Oblivion: A Cambridge Memoir and I Remember: A Life of Politics, Painting and People, as well as five children's books, which she also illustrated. She painted landscapes and portraits, and spent time in China, where she visited her sister and studied art.

The New York Times described Schlesinger as having been "raised in an opinionated family". She was a feminist, as was her mother. She was independent, with Robert F. Kennedy once asking Arthur if he was in control of his wife when she endorsed Adlai Stevenson over John F. Kennedy in the 1960 presidential election. The square in front of her house on 109 Irving St. in Cambridge, Massachusetts was named after her.

Schlesinger died on October 14, 2017, aged 105, in Cambridge.

== Works ==
- San Bao and his Adventures in Peking, 1939; 2d. edition Cambridge MA: Gale Hill Books, 1998.
- Children of the Fiery Mountain, New York: E.P. Dutton and Company, 1940.
- Snatched From Oblivion: A Cambridge Memoir, Boston: Little Brown and Company, 1979.
- I Remember: A Life of Politics, Painting and People, Cambridge MA: TidePool Press, 2012.
