= Imperial presidency =

Term for excessive US presidential power

Imperial presidency is a term describing the modern presidency of the United States. It became popular in the 1960s and served as the title of historian Arthur M. Schlesinger Jr.'s 1973 book The Imperial Presidency, addressing his concerns that the presidency was uncontrollable and had exceeded its constitutional limits.

According to political science professor Thomas E. Cronin, author of The State of the Presidency, the term "imperial presidency" describes the danger inherent in the American constitutional system's letting a president create and abuse presidential prerogatives during national emergencies, based on presidential war powers that are vaguely defined in the Constitution, and on secrecy which shields a president from checks and balances by the government's legislative and judicial branches.

== History ==
Until the 1930s, the president had few staff, most based in the Capitol, where the president had always maintained an office (the President's Room). The office later became used only for ceremonial occasions, but in the 19th and early 20th centuries, presidents regularly operated out of the Capitol Hill office. However, Franklin D. Roosevelt's presidency (1933–1945) during the Great Depression and World War II altered the previous importance of the office. The new age of electronic media, the growth of executive agencies under the New Deal, his Brain Trust advisors, and the creation of the Executive Office of the President in 1939 all marked the growth of the traditionally small presidential staff.

The post-war presidency has a large executive staff most often crowded in the West Wing (redesigned in 1934), the basement of the White House, or in the Eisenhower Executive Office Building, which is beside the White House and used by the Departments of Defense and State. Progressive overcrowding in the West Wing led President Richard Nixon to convert the former presidential swimming pool into a press room.

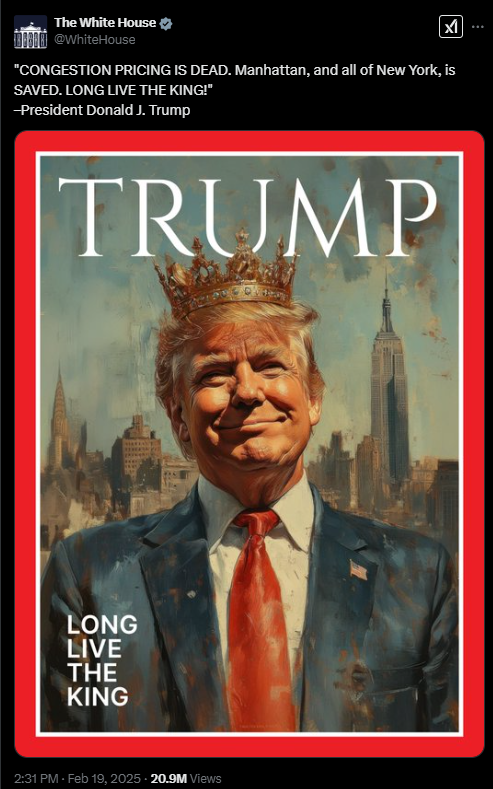
Tweet from the White House of Donald Trump as a king

Peter Baker wrote in The New York Times that the second Trump presidency had "established a new, more audacious version of the imperial presidency".

== Arguments for its existence ==
- As staff numbers increased, many people were appointed who held personal loyalty to the person serving as president and were not subject to outside approval or control.
- Advisory bodies developed around the presidency, many of which complemented the main cabinet departments, which declined in influence. The National Security Council and the Office of Management and Budget are prime examples.
- The Senate does not "advise and consent to" appointments to the Executive Office of the President (with only a handful of exceptions), as it does with cabinet appointments. A corollary is that EOP personnel are accountable only to the President and not to Congress.
- The presidency relies on implicit powers not found in the Constitution. The extent of foreign policy and war powers of the presidency are questioned. Also, the extent of presidential secrecy is questioned.
- A plebiscitary presidency is accountable only during elections or impeachment, rather than daily to the Congress, the press and the public.

The presidencies of Richard Nixon and Ronald Reagan were particularly described as surrounded by "courts" in which junior staffers acted occasionally in contravention of executive orders or Acts of Congress. Schlesinger pointed out activities of some Nixon staffers during the Watergate affair as an example. Under Reagan (1981–1989), the role of Lieutenant Colonel Oliver North, USMC, in the facilitation of funding to the Contras in Nicaragua, in explicit contravention of a congressional ban, was highlighted as an example of the ability to act by a "junior courtier" based on his position as a member of a large White House staff. Howard Baker, who served as Reagan's final Chief of Staff, was critical of the growth, complexity, and apparent unanswerability of the presidential "court".

Historian Zachary Karabell argued that executive power grew further in the 21st century, due in part to congressional inaction. Citing the presidencies of George W. Bush and Barack Obama as examples, he wrote: "9/11 saw the beginning of the current move toward an imperial presidency, as George W. Bush keyed off the crisis to expand executive authority in national security and domestic surveillance. In that, his administration had the legal but classified support of Congress, and for a time, a considerable portion of the public." Karabell said that this trend continued under Obama, and that "stonewalling" from Congress "provoked the Obama administration into finding innovative ways to exercise power," making Obama "one of the most powerful presidents ever." He wrote that this trend could potentially set precedent for further expansion of executive power.

Karabell later argued that the first presidency of Donald Trump had the possibly unintended effect of eroding executive power, citing the rescission of the DACA immigration policy and the Trump administration's threat to use its position to withdraw from NAFTA as instances which have led to some power being returned to Congress at the executive branch's expense. Nevertheless, Princeton University historians Kevin M. Kruse and Julian E. Zelizer argued that aspects of the imperial presidency were apparent in the Trump administration.

In 2024, the US Supreme Court granted presidents presumptive immunity from criminal prosecution for all official acts, and absolute immunity for acts within their "conclusive and preclusive" constitutional authority in a 6-3 ruling in the case Trump v. United States. In her dissenting opinion to the ruling, Justice Sonia Sotomayor said that "in every use of official power, the President is now a king above the law." Justice Ketanji Brown Jackson also described immunity as giving rise to a king in her dissent. Legal commentators have described the decision as enshrining the imperial presidency into law by placing the president above the law.

== Criticisms ==
- The Executive Office of the President makes up only a minute part of the federal bureaucracy, with no institutional continuity, and the president has little influence as to the appointment of most of its members.
- The organization and functioning of most of the federal government is determined by law, and the president has thus little power to reorganize it.

Alasdair Roberts argued that the concept of the imperial presidency neglects several important changes in the context of governance over the last three decades, all of which tend to restrict the president's actual power:

- The growth in the size and the complexity of the federal bureaucracy
- A battery of post-Nixon controls on executive power, including transparency rules and "watchdog bureaucracies" such as the federal Inspectors General, a strengthened Government Accountability Office, and the Congressional Budget Office
- The increased willingness of bureaucrats to protest or "blow the whistle" on policies with which they disagree, with stronger protection for whistleblowing
- Changes in information and communication technologies that amplify the effect of official dissent and increase the capacity of opponents to mobilize against executive action
- Declining public trust in and deference to federal authority
- Declining executive discretion over the use of federal funds, which are increasingly committed to mandatory programs
- Declining regulation of the private sector, as a consequence of the post-Reagan shift to neoliberal policies, economic globalization, and the growth of corporate lobbies

The "Imperiled Presidency" was a theory of former President Gerald Ford. Ford argued that rather than being too powerful, the president does not have enough power to be effective. The growth in the size of the bureaucracy surrounding the president since the New Deal made the executive more difficult to control. Ford said that "a principal weakness in the presidency is the inability of the White House to maintain control over the large federal bureaucracy. There is nothing more frustrating for a President than to issue an order to a Cabinet officer, and then find that, when the order gets out in the field, it is totally mutilated."

According to Dino P. Christenson and Douglas L. Kriner, presidents have considerable leeway to act independently of Congress and the courts, but unless domestic public opinion is in their favor, unilateral action risks inciting political pushback.

== Usage in other countries ==
The presidencies of France and South Korea have also been described as imperial presidencies.

Especially in South Korea, because of this, the Institute for Democracy and Diversity (V-Dem) insists that South Korea's dictatorship has been under way since Yoon Suk-yeol assumed office as president. V-Dem was based on the fact that the Yoon Seok-yeol government had taken suppressions against the opposition party. Yoon's attempted self-coup in the 2024 South Korean martial law crisis was the culmination of these efforts, resulting in his impeachment by the National Assembly and Constitutional Court.

== See also ==
- Abuse of power
- Color of law
- Fourth branch of government
- Madisonian model
- Monarchism in the United States
- National Emergencies Act
- Powers of the president of the United States
- President for life
- Separation of powers under the United States Constitution
- Unitary executive theory
- Democratic backsliding in the United States
