= A Thousand Days =

1965 book by Arthur M. Schlesinger Jr.

A Thousand Days: John F. Kennedy in the White House
- First edition
- Author: Arthur M. Schlesinger Jr.
- Language: English
- Subject: Kennedy administration
- Publisher: Houghton Mifflin
- Publication date: 1965
- Publication place: United States
- Media type: Print
- Pages: 1120
- ISBN: 0-618-21927-7
- OCLC: 50155083
- Dewey Decimal: 973.922/092 21
- LC Class: E841 .S3 2002

A Thousand Days: John F. Kennedy in the White House is a nonfiction book by American historian Arthur M. Schlesinger Jr., about the United States presidency of John F. Kennedy (1961–1963). As a special assistant to the president, he was able to observe the people and events that shaped the Kennedy administration. The book describes the policies, politics and personalities during Kennedy's time in office. Kennedy's cabinet is a focused aspect.

It was first published by Houghton Mifflin in 1965 and won both the National Book Award in History and Biography and the Pulitzer Prize for Biography or Autobiography in 1966.
