= The Disuniting of America =

1991 book by Arthur M. Schlesinger Jr.

- Author: Arthur M. Schlesinger Jr.
- Publisher: Whittle Books, W. W. Norton & Company
- Publication date: 1991
- Pages: 208
- ISBN: 978-0-393-31854-8

The Disuniting of America: Reflections on a Multicultural Society is a 1991 book written by American historian Arthur M. Schlesinger Jr., a former advisor to the Kennedy and other US administrations and a winner of the Pulitzer Prize.

Schlesinger states that a new attitude, one that celebrates difference and abandons assimilation, may replace the classic image of the melting pot in which differences are submerged in democracy. He argues that ethnic awareness has had many positive consequences to unite a nation with a "history of prejudice." However, the "cult of ethnicity," if pushed too far, may endanger the unity of society.

According to Schlesinger, multiculturalists are "very often ethnocentric separatists who see little in the Western heritage other than Western crimes." Their "mood is one of divesting Americans of their sinful European inheritance and seeking redemptive infusions from non-Western cultures."

The book was met with controversy in some scholarly and popular publications, and praise in others. The 91-page original work was expanded into a 208-page "revised and enlarged" edition, published in 1998.
