= Mary Antoinette Cannon =

American medical social worker and educator (1884–1962)

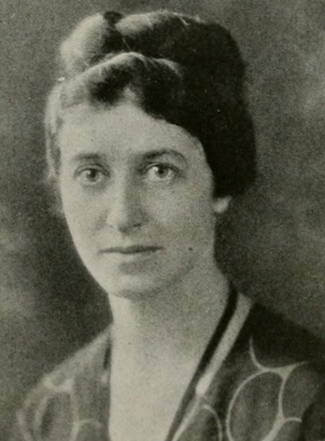
- Mary Antoinette Cannon, from a 1922 publication.
- Born: 1884; Deposit, New York
- Died: March 17, 1962 (aged 77–78)
- Occupations: social worker, college professor
- Years active: 1910–1946
- Known for: medical social work

Mary Antoinette Cannon (1884 – March 17, 1962) was an American medical social worker and social work educator. She was a professor in the New York School of Social Work at Columbia University, and president (1922–1923) of the American Association of Hospital Social Workers.

== Early life ==
Cannon was born in Deposit, New York, the daughter of Robert Miller Cannon and Antoinette Downs Wheeler Cannon. She graduated from Bryn Mawr College in 1907. She earned a master's degree at Columbia University in 1916.

== Career ==
After college, Cannon worked at Massachusetts General Hospital, one of the early practitioners of medical social work in a hospital setting. She worked at the Boston Consumptives Hospital from 1909 to 1910. From 1916 to 1921 she was Director of Social Work at University Hospital of Philadelphia. From 1921 to 1946 she was a professor in the Columbia University School of Social Work. In the 1941–1942 academic year, she took a leave from Columbia to be director of the Department of Social Work at the University of Puerto Rico.

Cannon was one of the founders of the American Association of Hospital Social Workers, and president of the organization in 1922–1923. She was co-editor of the textbook Social Case Work: An Outline for Teaching, which went through nine editions between 1933 and 1938, and author of two other monographs: Health Problems of the Foreign Born (1920), and Outline for a Course in Planned Parenthood (1944).

In 1949, Cannon was investigated by the House Committee on Un-American Activities, for her involvement in the Scientific and Cultural Conference for World Peace.

== Later life and legacy ==
After her retirement from Columbia in 1945, she was a consultant to Puerto Rico's Department of Labor, and taught at a social workers' workshop in Puerto Rico in 1953. She was director of the James Weldon Johnson Community Center in Harlem. In 1950, Columbia University established the Mary Antoinette Cannon Fellowship, for social work students of Puerto Rican birth or parentage.

== Personal life ==
Mary Antoinette Cannon shared a house in Greenwich Village from 1923 to 1962 with her partner Janet Thornton, a fellow Bryn Mawr alumna and a social worker based at the Columbia-Presbyterian Medical Center in New York City. Cannon died in 1962, aged 78 years, in New York.

== Ida Maud Cannon ==
A fellow founder of the American Association of Hospital Social Workers, Ida Maud Cannon (1877–1960), was not a relative of Mary Antoinette Cannon, though they were colleagues and worked together on committees.
