= The Almanac of American History =

1983 book

The Almanac of American History (1983) (revised edition 2004) is a reference work on American history in chronology format. Its general editor is Arthur M. Schlesinger, Jr., and the executive editor is John S. Bowman.

Schlesinger wrote the introduction; in the current edition the introduction to each of the six sections is written by a different noted scholar:

- "Founding a Nation" (986-1787)–Gordon S. Wood (Brown University)
- "Testing a Union" (1788-1865)–Marcus Cunliffe (George Washington University)
- "Forging a Nation" (1866-1900)–S.L. Mayer (University of Southern California)
- "Expanding Resources" (1901-1945)–Richard C. Wade (City University of New York)
- "Emerging as a World Power" (1946-1999)–Robert H. Ferrell (Indiana University)
- "Facing the Next Century" (2000-)–Rodney P. Carlisle (Rutgers University)
