= The Imperial Presidency =

1973 non-fiction book by Arthur M. Schlesinger Jr.

- Author: Arthur M. Schlesinger Jr.
- Language: English
- Publisher: Houghton Mifflin
- Publication date: 1973, 1989, 2004
- Publication place: United States
- Pages: 505 in 1973; 589 in 2004
- ISBN: 978-0-395-17713-6
- OCLC: 704887

The Imperial Presidency is a work by historian Arthur M. Schlesinger Jr. Published in 1973 by Houghton Mifflin, the book was reissued in 1989 with a 79-page epilogue and then re-released by Houghton Mifflin in 2004 in a Mariner Books paperback edition that included a new 16-page introduction. A one-volume work, it recounts and analyzes the history of the presidency of the United States from the office's conception as this emerged from the Constitutional Convention and then developed through the latter half of the 20th century, with special attention to aspects of war powers. Schlesinger's book popularized the term imperial presidency and has been described as "the most prominent school of thought on executive war powers" and "a lens through which to understand and critique the executive branch in the post-9/11 world".

== Background ==
Schlesinger began writing The Imperial Presidency in March, 1973, shortly after Richard Nixon's reelection as president and the escalation of the Watergate scandal. Schlesinger had intended the book to examine how war-making power had been extended unofficially by the office of the president; in his journal, he reflected that "Watergate came along to provide the climax and, I trust, denouement." The rapidly written book was published by Thanksgiving. Schlesinger, who had been a vocal advocate for a strong, activist executive being essential to democracy, acknowledges in The Imperial Presidency that expansions of presidential power had led to dangerous abuse of the office.

The reissue in 2004 included a new introduction in which Schlesinger excoriated George W. Bush as an imperial president, calling the 2003 invasion of Iraq "the needless war".

== Synopsis ==
The Imperial Presidency examines changes in the extent of executive power, particularly in the context of war, from the establishment of the United States through the presidency of Richard Nixon. It discusses how the applications of the Constitutional authority to declare war given to Congress and the Constitutional authority to conduct foreign policy and act as commander-in-chief given to the president have evolved since the government's inception, creating a dangerous imbalance in the separation of powers.

The book argues that throughout US history, the office of the president gradually appropriated authority exceeding that which was granted to the presidency by the Constitution, resulting in a concurrent erosion in congressional authority. The Imperial Presidency identifies a pattern of presidents during critical points in history setting policies and taking actions that were arguably the province of Congress, to be followed by a return to "normalcy" when the crisis had passed. Schlesinger presents James K. Polk's deployment of troops to the disputed area between Texas and Mexico, leading to the Mexican–American War, as the first example of a president exploiting the ambiguity of war-making powers in the Constitution. Another example he gives is Abraham Lincoln and his executive orders and actions during the American Civil War, such as the suspension of habeas corpus.

The book argues that the pattern of expansion and reversion was disrupted by World War II. The state of world affairs in its wake engendered a condition of "perpetual crisis", a condition that presidents relied upon to justify extending executive privilege largely unabated. Most of The Imperial Presidency addresses events after World War II. Schlesinger writes:

...by the 1970s the American President had become on issues of war and peace the most absolute monarch (with the possible exception of Mao Tse-tung of China) among the great powers of the world.

The book criticizes Nixon extensively, but concludes that the Nixon administration was "not an aberration but a culmination" of the trend toward an imperial presidency. As Congress permitted its authority to be diminished in deference to the presidents, it encouraged the presidents to extend their imperial powers in the domestic sphere as well.

The final third of the book presents prescriptions for potential reforms of the presidency.

== Reception ==
A review in The Baltimore Sun by Stuart Rochester called the book "brilliant, timely", noting that it clearly illustrates Schlesinger's personal conviction of the need for a strong presidency. Historian Laura Kalman wrote that the book "fares less well as scholarship than activism, history than polemic", but calls it a "beautifully written page-turner". She also observes that Schlesinger's preferences for specific presidents colors his evaluations of their policies and actions.

Reviewer Richard J. Walton admired Schlesinger's examination of the justification for presidents exceeding the letter of the Constitution, but wrote that the haste with which the book was written was obvious and that some of the language, particularly in regards to Nixon, could be considered overly polemic.

Christopher Lehmann-Haupt observed that The Imperial Presidency read like two overlapping books: one that presents a compelling history of the relationship between the executive and legislative branches of the government, and one that prescribes approaches for dealing with the Watergate crisis. Lehmann-Haupt concludes, "what he has ended up with is hybrid — not completely history and not quite a polemic."

Harry McPherson wrote that despite occasional bias, The Imperial Presidency is "an invaluable guide to those who wish to see, in the maelstrom of recent events, the outlines of a legitimate Presidency".

In The New York Times, Garry Wills argued that The Imperial Presidency was unable to deal with the problem that Nixon, like previous presidents, was fulfilling the demands of the general populace, and that systematic changes would not prevent a president from catering to the public.

An article in Presidential Studies Quarterly, 25 years later, noted that The Imperial Presidency "has provided political discourse with a common vocabulary and a common understanding" and called it "a classic in the field".

== See also ==
- Executive branch
- Fourth branch of government
- Signing statement
- Separation of powers under the United States Constitution
- Unitary executive theory
