= Arthur M. Schlesinger Jr. =

American intellectual (1917–2007)

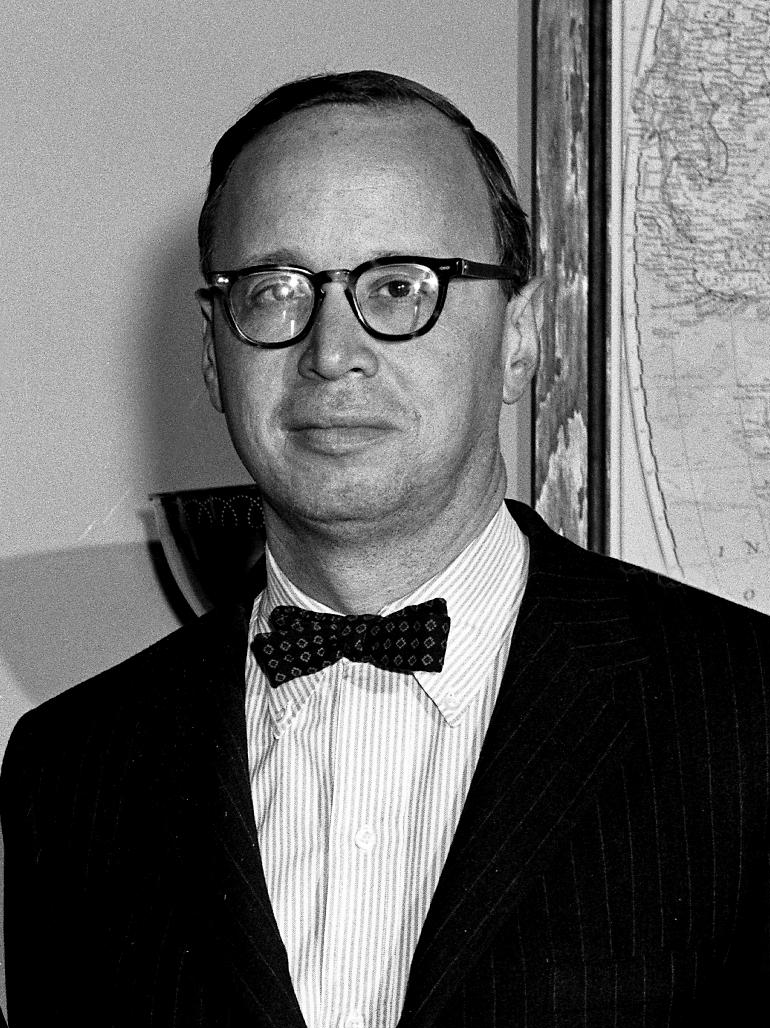
- Schlesinger in 1961
- Born: Arthur Bancroft Schlesinger; October 15, 1917; Columbus, Ohio, U.S.
- Died: February 28, 2007 (aged 89); New York City, U.S.
- Education: Harvard University (AB); Peterhouse, Cambridge
- Occupations: Historian, writer
- Spouse(s): Marian Cannon (m. 1940; div. 1970) Alexandra Emmet Allan (m. 1971)
- Children: 5
- Writing career
- Period: 1939–2007
- Subjects: Politics, social issues, history
- Notable awards: Pulitzer Prize (1946, 1966); National Humanities Medal (1998)
- Movement: American liberal theory

Arthur Meier Schlesinger Jr. (/ˈʃlɛsɪndʒər/ SHLESS-in-jər; born Arthur Bancroft Schlesinger; October 15, 1917 – February 28, 2007) was an American historian, social critic, and public intellectual. The son of the influential historian Arthur M. Schlesinger Sr. and a specialist in American history, much of Schlesinger's work explored the history of 20th-century American liberalism. In particular, his work focused on leaders such as Harry S. Truman, Franklin D. Roosevelt, John F. Kennedy, and Robert F. Kennedy. In the 1952 and 1956 presidential campaigns, he was a primary speechwriter and adviser to the Democratic presidential nominee, Adlai Stevenson II. Schlesinger served as special assistant and "court historian" to President Kennedy from 1961 to 1963. He wrote a detailed account of the Kennedy administration, from the 1960 presidential campaign to the president's state funeral, titled A Thousand Days: John F. Kennedy in the White House, which won the 1966 Pulitzer Prize for Biography or Autobiography.

In 1968, Schlesinger actively supported the presidential campaign of Senator Robert F. Kennedy, which ended with Kennedy's assassination in Los Angeles. Schlesinger wrote a popular biography, Robert Kennedy and His Times, several years later. He later popularized the term "imperial presidency" during the Nixon administration in his 1973 book, The Imperial Presidency.

== Early life and career ==
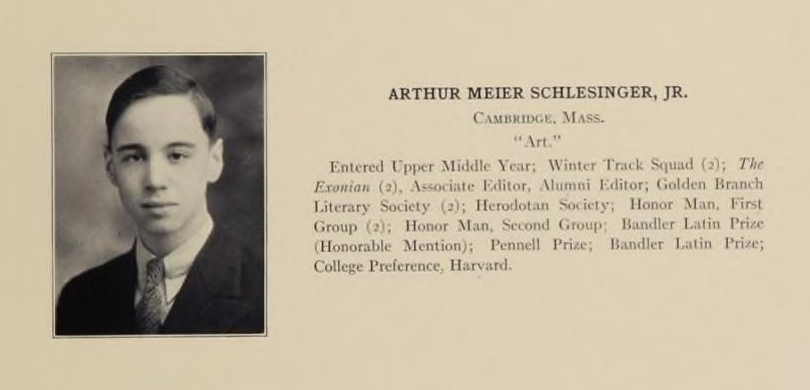
Schlesinger in the Phillips Exeter Academy yearbook, 1933

Schlesinger was born in Columbus, Ohio, the son of Elizabeth Harriet (née Bancroft) and Arthur M. Schlesinger (1888–1965), who was an influential social historian at Ohio State University and Harvard University, where he directed many PhD dissertations in American history. His paternal grandfather was a Prussian Jew who converted to Protestantism and then married an Austrian Catholic. His mother, a Mayflower descendant, was of German and New England ancestry, as well as a relative of historian George Bancroft, according to family tradition. Schlesinger practiced Unitarianism.

Schlesinger attended the Phillips Exeter Academy in New Hampshire and received his undergraduate degree at the age of 20 from Harvard College, where he graduated summa cum laude in 1938. After spending the 1938–1939 academic year at Peterhouse, Cambridge, as a Henry Fellow, he was appointed to a three-year Junior Fellowship in the Harvard Society of Fellows in the fall of 1939. At the time, Fellows were not allowed to pursue advanced degrees, "a requirement intended to keep them off the standard academic treadmill"; as such, Schlesinger would never earn a doctorate. His fellowship was interrupted by the United States entering World War II. After failing his military medical examination, Schlesinger joined the Office of War Information. From 1943 to 1945, he served as an intelligence analyst in the Research and Analysis Branch of the Office of Strategic Services (OSS), a precursor to the CIA.

Schlesinger's service in the OSS allowed him time to complete his first Pulitzer Prize–winning book, The Age of Jackson, in 1945. From 1946 to 1954, he was an associate professor at Harvard, becoming a full professor in 1954.

== Political activities before 1960 ==
In 1947, Schlesinger founded Americans for Democratic Action, together with former First Lady Eleanor Roosevelt; Minneapolis Mayor and future Senator and Vice President Hubert Humphrey; economist and longtime friend John Kenneth Galbraith; and Protestant theologian Reinhold Niebuhr. Schlesinger acted as the ADA's national chairman from 1953 to 1954.

After President Harry S. Truman announced he would not run for a second full term in the 1952 presidential election, Schlesinger became the primary speechwriter for and an ardent supporter of Governor Adlai E. Stevenson of Illinois. In the 1956 election, Schlesinger, along with 30-year-old Robert F. Kennedy, again worked on Stevenson's campaign staff. Schlesinger supported the nomination of Massachusetts Senator John F. Kennedy as Stevenson's vice-presidential running mate, but at the Democratic National Convention, Kennedy came second in the vice-presidential balloting, losing to Senator Estes Kefauver of Tennessee.

Schlesinger had known John F. Kennedy since attending Harvard and increasingly socialized with Kennedy and his wife Jacqueline in the 1950s. In 1954, The Boston Post publisher John Fox Jr. planned a series of newspaper pieces labeling several Harvard figures, including Schlesinger, as reds; Kennedy intervened in Schlesinger's behalf, which Schlesinger recounted in A Thousand Days.

During the 1960 campaign, Schlesinger supported Kennedy, causing consternation to Stevenson loyalists. Kennedy campaigned actively but Stevenson refused to run unless he was drafted at the convention. After Kennedy won the nomination, Schlesinger helped the campaign as a sometime speechwriter, speaker, and member of the ADA. He also wrote the book Kennedy or Nixon: Does It Make Any Difference? in which he lauded Kennedy's abilities and scorned Vice President Richard M. Nixon as having "no ideas, only methods.... He cares about winning."

== Kennedy administration ==
After the election, the president-elect offered Schlesinger an ambassadorship and Assistant Secretary of State for Cultural Relations before Robert Kennedy proposed that Schlesinger serve as a "sort of roving reporter and troubleshooter." Schlesinger quickly accepted, and on January 30, 1961, he resigned from Harvard and was appointed Special Assistant to the President. He worked primarily on Latin American affairs and as a speechwriter during his tenure in the White House.

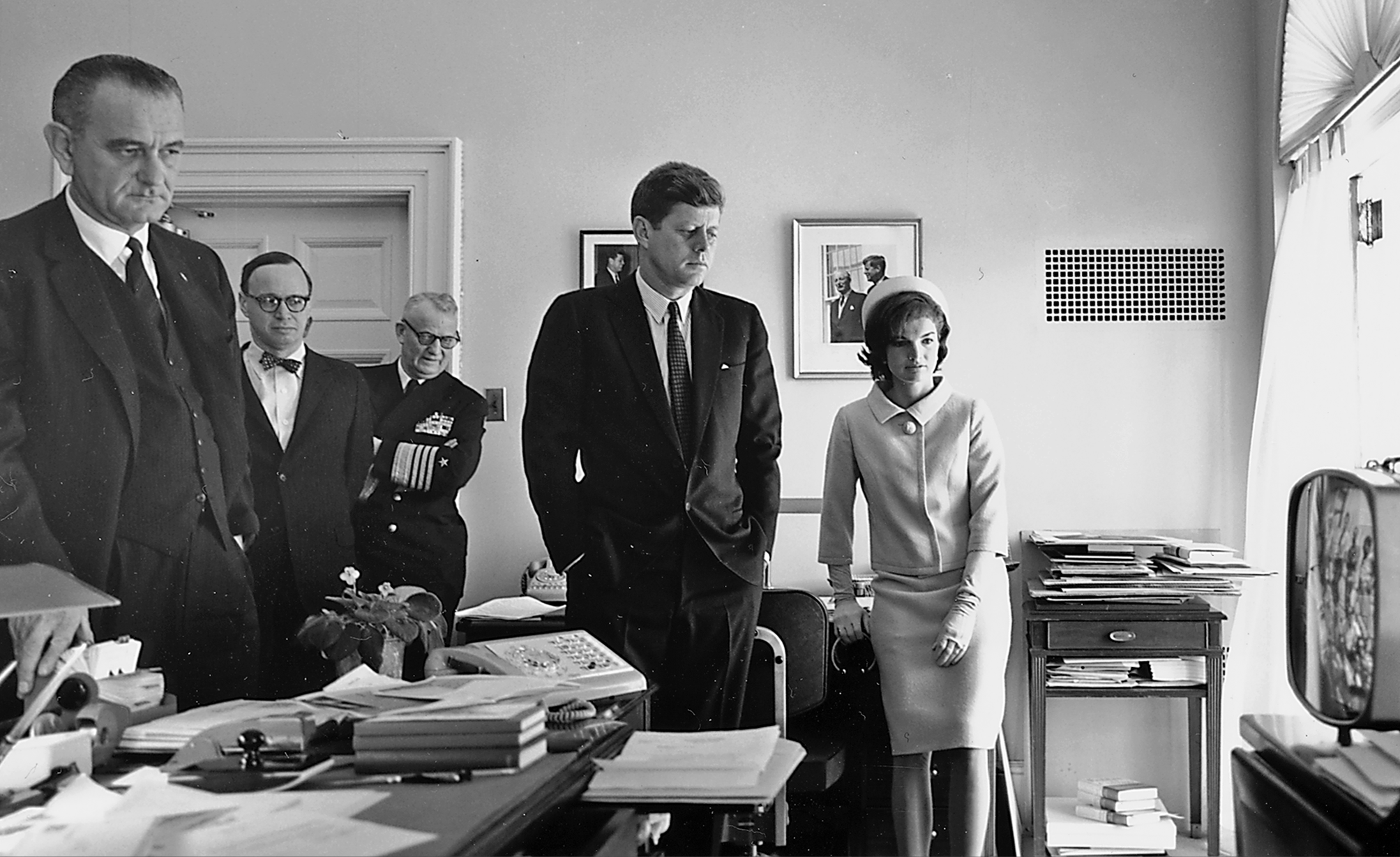
Schlesinger watching flight of Alan Shepard's Mercury-Redstone 3 with President Kennedy, Vice President Johnson, Jackie Kennedy, and Admiral Arleigh Burke in the White House Office of the President's Secretary, May 5, 1961

In February 1961, Schlesinger was first told of the "Cuba operation," which would eventually become the Bay of Pigs Invasion. He opposed the plan in a memorandum to the president: "at one stroke you would dissipate all the extraordinary good will which has been rising toward the new Administration through the world. It would fix a malevolent image of the new Administration in the minds of millions." He, however, suggested:

Would it not be possible to induce Castro to take offensive action first? He has already launched expeditions against Panama and against the Dominican Republic. One can conceive a black operation in, say, Haiti which might in time lure Castro into sending a few boatloads of men on to a Haitian beach in what could be portrayed as an effort to overthrow the Haitian regime. If only Castro could be induced to commit an offensive act, then the moral issue would be butted, and the anti-US campaign would be hobbled from the start.

During the Cabinet deliberations, he "shrank into a chair at the far end of the table and listened in silence" as the Joint Chiefs and CIA representatives lobbied the president for an invasion. Along with his friend, Senator William Fulbright, Schlesinger sent several memos to the president opposing the strike; however, during the meetings, he held back his opinion, reluctant to undermine the President's desire for a unanimous decision. Following the overt failure of the invasion, Schlesinger later lamented, "In the months after the Bay of Pigs, I bitterly reproached myself for having kept so silent during those crucial discussions in the cabinet room. ... I can only explain my failure to do more than raise a few timid questions by reporting that one's impulse to blow the whistle on this nonsense was simply undone by the circumstances of the discussion." After the furor died down, Kennedy joked that Schlesinger "wrote me a memorandum that will look pretty good when he gets around to writing his book on my administration. Only he better not publish that memorandum while I'm still alive!" During the Cuban Missile Crisis, Schlesinger was not a member of the executive committee of the National Security Council (EXCOMM) but helped UN Ambassador Adlai Stevenson draft his presentation of the crisis to the UN Security Council.

In October 1962, Schlesinger became afraid of "a tremendous advantage", which "all-out Soviet commitment to cybernetics" would provide the Soviets. Schlesinger further warned that "by 1970 the USSR may have a radically new production technology, involving total enterprises or complexes of industries, managed by closed-loop, feedback control employing self-teaching computers". The cause was a pre-vision of an algorithmic governance of economy by an internet-like computer network authored by Soviet scientists, particularly Alexander Kharkevich.

After President Kennedy was assassinated on November 22, 1963, Schlesinger resigned his position in January 1964. He wrote a memoir/history of the Kennedy administration, A Thousand Days: John F. Kennedy in the White House, which won him his second Pulitzer Prize in 1966.

== Later career ==
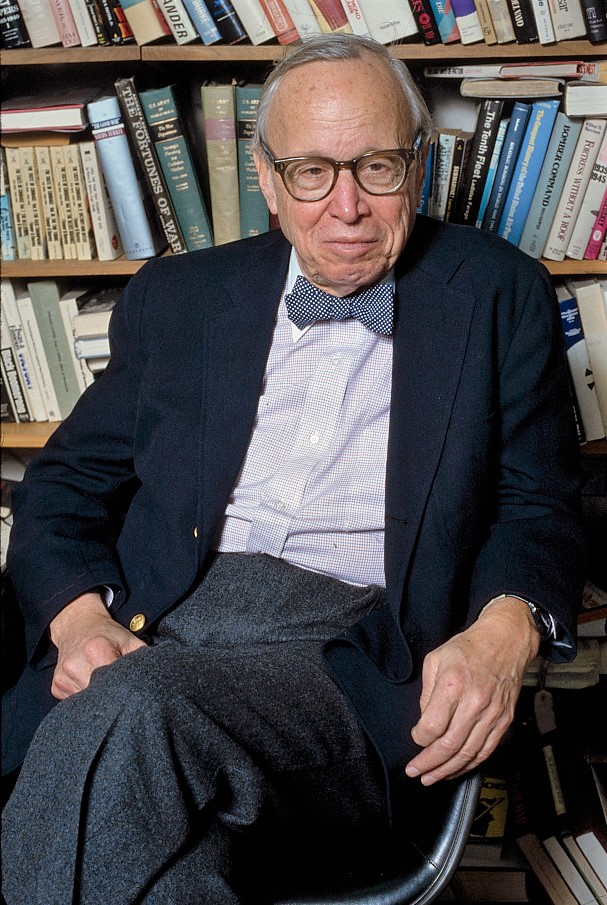
Schlesinger in his NYC office, 1988

Schlesinger returned to teaching in 1966 as the Albert Schweitzer Professor of the Humanities at the CUNY Graduate Center. After his retirement from teaching in 1994, he remained an active member of the Graduate Center community as an emeritus professor until his death.

Schlesinger was a very good friend of Katharine Graham, publisher at The Washington Post and when she died in 2001, he gave one of the eulogies at her funeral at Washington National Cathedral.

== Later politics ==
After his service for the Kennedy administration, he continued to be a Kennedy loyalist for the rest of his life, campaigning for Robert Kennedy's tragic presidential campaign in 1968 and for Senator Edward M. Kennedy in 1980. At the request of Robert Kennedy's widow, Ethel Kennedy, he wrote the biography Robert Kennedy and His Times, which was published in 1978.

Throughout the 1960s and 1970s, he criticized Richard Nixon as a candidate and as president. His prominent status as a liberal Democrat and outspoken disdain of Nixon led to his placement on the master list of Nixon's political opponents. Ironically, Nixon would become his next-door neighbor in the years following the Watergate scandal.

After retiring from teaching, he remained involved in politics through his books and public speaking tours. Schlesinger was a critic of the Clinton Administration, resisting President Clinton's co-opting of his "Vital Center" concept in an article for Slate in 1997. In 1999, Schlesinger, along with thousands of other public figures in the United States, signed an open letter calling for a moratorium on U.S. executions. Schlesinger was also a critic of the 2003 Iraq War, calling it a misadventure. He blamed the media for not covering a reasoned case against the war.

== Personal life ==
Schlesinger's name at birth was Arthur Bancroft Schlesinger; since his mid-teens, he had instead used the signature Arthur M. Schlesinger Jr. He had five children, four from his first marriage to author and artist Marian Cannon Schlesinger and a son and stepson from his second marriage to Alexandra Emmet, also an artist:

- Stephen Schlesinger (b. 1942), a notable author of books on foreign affairs and former director of the World Policy Institute
- Katharine Kinderman (1942–2004), an author and producer, who was married to Gibbs Kinderman and later Thomas Tiffany
- Christina Schlesinger (b. 1946), a prominent artist and muralist
- Andrew Schlesinger, writer and editor
- Robert Schlesinger (b. 1972) writer and editor

== Career ==
=== Education ===
- 1933 Phillips Exeter Academy
- 1938 A.B. summa cum laude, Harvard University
- 1938–1939 Henry Fellow, Peterhouse, Cambridge
- 1939–1942 Society of Fellows, Harvard University

=== World War II service ===
- 1942–1943 Office of War Information
- 1943–1945 Office of Strategic Services

=== Educator ===
- 1946–1954 Associate Professor of History, Harvard University
- 1954–1962 Professor of History, Harvard University
- 1966 Visiting Fellow, Institute for Advanced Study, Princeton, New Jersey
- 1966–1994 Albert Schweitzer Professor of Humanities, CUNY Graduate Center (Emeritus, 1994–2007)

=== Democratic Party activist ===
- Among the founders of Americans for Democratic Action
- Speechwriter for Adlai Stevenson's two presidential campaigns in 1952 and 1956
- Speechwriter for John F. Kennedy's campaign in 1960
- 1961–1964 Special Assistant to the President for Latin American affairs and speechwriting
- Speechwriter for Robert F. Kennedy's campaign in 1968
- Speechwriter for George McGovern's campaign in 1972
- Active in the presidential campaign of Ted Kennedy in 1980

== Death ==
On February 28, 2007, Schlesinger suffered a heart attack while dining with family at Bobby Van's Steakhouse on Park Avenue in Manhattan. He was taken to New York Downtown Hospital, where he died at the age of 89. His New York Times obituary described him as a "historian of power." He is buried in Mount Auburn Cemetery in Cambridge, Massachusetts.

== Works ==
He won a Pulitzer Prize for History in 1946 for his book The Age of Jackson, covering the intellectual environment of Jacksonian democracy.

His 1949 book The Vital Center made a case for the New Deal policies of Franklin D. Roosevelt and was harshly critical of both unregulated capitalism and of those liberals such as Henry A. Wallace who advocated coexistence with communism.

In his book The Politics of Hope (1962), Schlesinger terms conservatives the "party of the past" and liberals "the party of hope" and calls for overcoming the division between both parties.

He won a second Pulitzer in the Biography category in 1966 for A Thousand Days.

His 1986 book The Cycles of American History, a collection of essays and articles, contains "The Cycles of American Politics," an early work on the topic; it was influenced by his father's work on cycles.

He became a leading opponent of multiculturalism in the 1980s and articulated this stance in his book The Disuniting of America (1991).

Published posthumously in 2007, Journals 1952–2000 is the 894-page distillation of 6,000 pages of Schlesinger diaries on a wide variety of subjects, edited by Andrew and Stephen Schlesinger.

== Selected bibliography ==
This is a partial listing of Schlesinger's published works:

=== Articles ===
- "The Future of Socialism". Partisan Review, May/June 1947.
- "The Crisis of American Masculinity" Esquire, November 1958.
- "The Many Faces of Communism, Part 1: The Theological Society". Harper's Magazine, January 1960.
- "Origins of the Cold War". Foreign Affairs, Vol. 46, No. 1, October 1967.
- "Against Academic Apartheid". The Social Contract, Vol. 1, No. 1, Inaugural Issue, Fall 1990.

=== Books ===
- 1939 Orestes A. Brownson: A Pilgrim's Progress
- 1945 The Age of Jackson
- 1949 The Vital Center: The Politics of Freedom
- 1950 What About Communism?
- 1951 The General and the President, and the Future of American Foreign Policy
- 1957 The Crisis of the Old Order: 1919–1933 (The Age of Roosevelt, Vol. I)
- 1958 The Coming of the New Deal: 1933–1935 (The Age of Roosevelt, Vol. II)
- 1960 The Politics of Upheaval: 1935–1936 (The Age of Roosevelt, Vol. III)
- 1960 Kennedy or Nixon: Does It Make Any Difference?
- 1962 The Politics of Hope
- 1963 Paths of American Thought (ed. with Morton White)
- 1965 A Thousand Days: John F. Kennedy in the White House
- 1965 The MacArthur Controversy and American Foreign Policy
- 1967 The Bitter Heritage: Vietnam and American Democracy, 1941–1966
- 1967 Congress and the Presidency: Their Role in Modern Times
- 1968 Violence: America in the Sixties
- 1969 The Crisis of Confidence: Ideas, Power, and Violence in America
- 1970 The Origins of the Cold War
- 1973 The Imperial Presidency – reissued in 1989 (with a 79-page epilogue) and in 2004 (with a new 16-page introduction to the Mariner Books paperback edition)
- 1978 Robert Kennedy and His Times – adapted into a 1985 TV miniseries
- 1983 Creativity in Statecraft
- 1983 The Almanac of American History – revised edition, 2004
- 1986 The Cycles of American History
- 1988 JFK Remembered
- 1988 War and the Constitution: Abraham Lincoln and Franklin D. Roosevelt
- 1988 Cleopatra, New York: Chelsea House (Hoobler, Dorothy; Hoobler, Thomas; introductory essay "On leadership" by Arthur M. Schlesinger Jr.)
- 1990 Is the Cold War Over?
- 1991 The Disuniting of America: Reflections on a Multicultural Society
- 2000 20th Century Day by Day: 100 Years Of News From January 1, 1900, to December 31, 1999
- 2000 A Life in the 20th Century, Innocent Beginnings, 1917–1950
- 2004 War and the American Presidency
- 2007 Journals 1952–2000
- 2011 Jacqueline Kennedy: Historic Conversations on Life With John F Kennedy (Mrs. Kennedy's interview shortly after her husband's assassination)

Besides writing biographies he also wrote a foreword to a book on Vladimir Putin which came out in 2003 under the same name and was published by Chelsea House Publishers.

Schlesinger's papers will be available at the New York Public Library.

== Awards ==
- 1946 Pulitzer Prize for History – The Age of Jackson
- 1955 Elected member of the American Academy of Arts and Sciences
- 1958 Bancroft Prize – The Crisis of the Old Order
- 1958 Francis Parkman Prize – The Crisis of the Old Order
- 1966 National Book Award in History and Biography – A Thousand Days
- 1966 Pulitzer Prize for Biography – A Thousand Days
- 1978 Golden Plate Award of the American Academy of Achievement
- 1979 National Book Award in Biography – Robert Kennedy and His Times
- 1987 Elected member of the American Philosophical Society
- 1998 National Humanities Medal
- 2003 Four Freedoms Award
- 2006 Paul Peck Award
- 2006 Niebuhr Medal Awarded by Elmhurst College to an individual who exemplifies the ideals of Reinhold and H. Richard Niebuhr. Schlesinger was greatly influenced by Reinhold Niebuhr.

== See also ==
- Political history in the United States, for historiography
