= Bradford Cannon =

American surgeon (1907–2005)

- Born: 2 December 1907
- Died: 20 December 2005 (aged 98)
- Education: Columbia University (BA)
- Spouse: Ellen (died 2003)
- Children: Sarah
- Parent(s): Walter Cannon; Cornelia James

Bradford Cannon (December 2, 1907 – December 20, 2005), the son of Dr. Walter Cannon, was a pioneer in the field of reconstructive surgery, specialising in burn victims. He was the first chief of plastic and reconstructive surgery at Massachusetts General Hospital and is credited with saving the lives of thousands of soldiers maimed during World War 2. As a young doctor, he used a new method he developed with Oliver Cope to treat survivors of the Cocoanut Grove fire in November 1942.

From 1943 to 1947, Cannon served in the U.S. Army as chief of the plastic surgical section of Valley Forge General Hospital in Pennsylvania, which cared for casualties from Europe and the Pacific. His daughter, Sarah Cannon Holden, said his group performed more than 15,000 operations.

He also served as president of the Boston Surgical Society, the New England Society of Plastic & Reconstructive Surgery, and the American Association of Plastic Surgeons.

In the 1950s, Cannon also worked as a consultant for the U.S. Atomic Energy Commission and visited the Marshall Islands to study effects of radioactivity on the population from atomic tests.

He graduated from Harvard College and Harvard Medical School.

== Family ==
Cannon and his wife Ellen DeNormandie Cannon (died 2003) lived in Lincoln, Massachusetts.
