= Christina Schlesinger =

American painter (born 1946)

- Born: November 19, 1946 (age 79); Washington, D.C., United States
- Education: Radcliffe College; Rutgers University
- Occupation: Artist
- Known for: Painting and mural creation
- Parent(s): Arthur Schlesinger, Jr; Marian Cannon Schlesinger

Christina Schlesinger (born November 19, 1946) is an American painter and muralist. Daughter of historian Arthur M. Schlesinger Jr., she sought independence from her family's fame, practiced "protest art", and came out as a lesbian. She made a strong rapport with the Chicano community in Venice, California, where she founded the multi-cultural art center SPARC.

== Life and career ==
Schlesinger is the daughter of the famous historian, Arthur M. Schlesinger Jr. and artist Marian Cannon Schlesinger. Schlesinger grew up in Cambridge, Massachusetts. She had two brothers, Stephen and Andrew, a half-brother, Robert and a sister, Katharine who died in 2004 of ovarian cancer. She was the middle child. Schlesinger's mother was an accomplished artist in her own right.

Schlesinger always considered herself a tomboy and recalls that she and her mother argued about her wearing dresses. Instead, she wanted to do things which were considered traditionally male at the time.

Schlesinger attended Radcliffe College and was an English and Fine Arts major, graduating cum laude in 1968. She attended the Skowhegan School of Painting and Sculpture during the summer of 1968. After Schlesinger finished school, she started to create "protest art." Her mother and father were divorced in 1970. The divorce created a desire in Schlesinger to "get away" and she had her own things to say.

In 1971, Schlesinger moved to Los Angeles. Schlesinger came out as a lesbian in Venice, California and found the Chicano community to be supportive of her. Schlesinger met artist, Judy Baca, at a lesbian bar, Big Brothers, in Venice where Baca was recruiting artists to paint The History of Venice murals. The two artists then collaborated on that mural. In 1976, she and Baca and filmmaker Donna Deitch, co-founded SPARC. Schlesinger was instrumental in coming up with the name of the center. Schlesinger remains proud of her part in SPARC and its commitment to public art that uncovers hidden parts of history and lends a political and social consciousness to art. She was also part of the team of artists who helped design The Great Wall of Los Angeles.

Schlesinger moved back to New York in the 1980s, where she quickly started showing her work. In the early 1990s, Schlesinger became part of the Guerrilla Girls. Each artist in the Guerrilla Girls chooses to remain anonymous and go by an artist's name. Schlesinger chose the name Romaine Brooks.

Schlesinger received an MFA from Rutgers in 1994.

Schlesinger was a cultural history and art teacher at the Ross School, where she worked from 1996 until 2005. During this time, she and her partner, sculptor Nancy Fried, adopted their daughter, Chun from China.

In 2001, she moved to East Hampton and later built a studio there.

In 2008, Schlesinger was diagnosed with non-Hodgkin lymphoma. The treatment and complications from the cancer kept her from painting for two years. After her recovery, Schlesinger continued to work, teach and show her art in different venues.

== Art ==
In the 1990s Schlesinger created "explicitly erotic work." During the 1990s, it was very taboo for lesbians to bring up issues of sexuality, and many felt as if they were "forced into hiding." Schlesinger boldly depicted lesbians (including portraits of herself) wearing dildos and penetrating other women. Schlesinger was interested in "representing female masculinity" and "refuting the notion that the artist's erotic gaze is exclusively male." Her work was also very much about embracing and celebrating her sexuality. These paintings and etchings of a very erotic nature were considered gutsy and ground-breaking, and many of them were not shown again until 2014.

Chagall Comes to Venice Beach (1991) is a large mural, 138 by 18 feet long, painted on the Israel Levin Senior Adult Center in Venice, California. The mural celebrates the Jewish community of Los Angeles. In 1994, the mural was destroyed in the Northridge earthquake. Schlesinger returned to Los Angeles in 1996 to repaint the mural now called Chagall Returns to Venice Beach. In 2016, the mural was land marked by the city of Los Angeles. In 2018 the building was renovated and the mural was destroyed a second time. In 2021, the Jewish Federation re-commissioned Schlesinger to paint a 15 by 9 foot interior mural, printed on metal and visible to the public from the boardwalk through a bank of windows.

Schlesinger's landscape paintings include her birch trees series which use images of nature as a stand-in for love and eroticism. The Long Good-Bye depicts two trees in the moonlight.

Schlesinger's current work embraces her love of mural painting and nature. It consists of large scale ink paintings of trees and waterfalls on bed sheets, influenced by both the scale of mural painting as well as earlier brush painting techniques she learned in China.

Some of her artistic influences include Henri de Toulouse-Lautrec, Giotto, photographer BrassaÏ, Miriam Schapiro, and Sigmar Polke.

== Quotes ==
"The tomboy is the lesbian's inner core, her secret weapon."
