= Stephen Schlesinger =

American historian and author

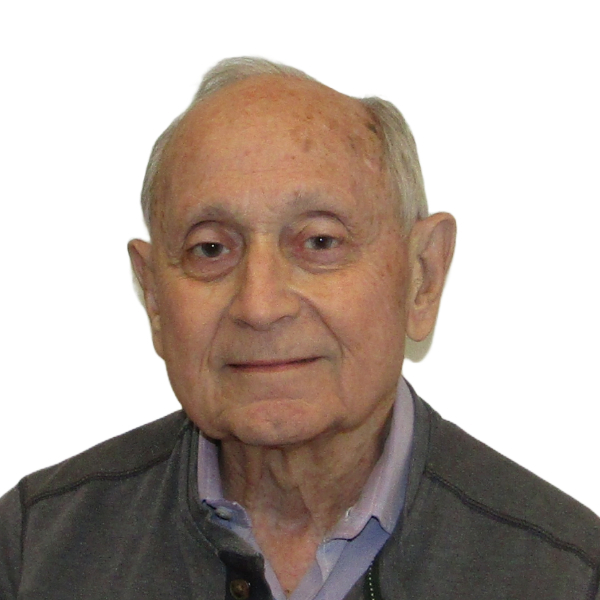
- Born: Stephen Schlesinger; August 17, 1942 (age 84); Cambridge, Massachusetts, United States
- Occupations: Author, political commentator, historian, international affairs specialist
- Writing career
- Genre: Nonfiction
- Notable works: Act of Creation: The Founding of the United Nations; Bitter Fruit: The Story of the U.S. Coup in Guatemala

Stephen C. Schlesinger (born August 17, 1942) is an American historian, political commentator, and international affairs specialist. He is a Fellow at the Century Foundation in New York City. He served as director of the World Policy Institute at the New School University from 1997 to 2006. He was foreign policy advisor to New York State Governor Mario Cuomo during his three terms in office.

He has authored and co-authored books, including Act of Creation: The Founding of the United Nations and Bitter Fruit: The Story of the U.S. Coup in Guatemala. His work spans journalism, public policy, and academia, focusing on foreign relations, political history, and the role of international organizations.

== Early life and education ==
Schlesinger was born to Arthur M. Schlesinger Jr. and Marian Cannon Schlesinger in Cambridge, Massachusetts. His two grandfathers, father, and uncle all held teaching positions at Harvard University. Schlesinger attended Phillips Exeter Academy, Harvard College, and Harvard Law School.

== Career ==
=== Journalism ===
Schlesinger began as a freelance writer investigating the 1967 Algiers Motel murders in Detroit and covering the 1968 Czechoslovakia uprisings against the Soviet occupation. Later he served as special assistant to Edward Logue at the New York State Urban Development Corporation from 1968 to 1969. In the early 1970s, Schlesinger edited and published The New Democrat Magazine, a monthly publication focused on uniting progressive voices within the Democratic Party. The magazine was critical of Democratic National Committee chairman Larry O'Brien, and promoted the candidacy of South Dakota Senator George McGovern rather than of Maine Senator Ed Muskie and former Vice President Hubert Humphrey during the 1972 Democratic presidential primaries. He later worked as a staff writer for Time Magazine, where he reported on a variety of domestic and international topics.

=== Public service ===
For twelve years, Schlesinger served as speechwriter and foreign policy advisor to New York State Governor Mario Cuomo during his three terms in office. In the mid-1990s, he joined the United Nations, working with Habitat, the agency focused on urban development and housing.

=== Academia ===
From 1997 to 2006, Schlesinger was the director of the World Policy Institute at The New School in New York City. He also served as publisher of its flagship quarterly magazine, The World Policy Journal.

=== Author ===
Schlesinger's book, Bitter Fruit (1982), co-authored with Stephen Kinzer, was about the 1954 US coup in Guatemala. His subsequent book, about the UN's founding, was Act of Creation (2003), an account of the 1945 San Francisco conference that drafted the UN Charter. In 2007, with his brother, Andrew, he edited his father's Journals 1952-2000 Arthur Schlesinger Jr. (2007) which covers Schlesinger's life through the second half of the twentieth century. Subsequently, Schlesinger co-edited with his brother The Letters of Arthur Schlesinger Jr. (2013).

== Bibliography ==
- Why England Slept by John F. Kennedy (new edition, Praeger 2016, with introduction by Stephen Schlesinger)
- The Letters of Arthur Schlesinger Jr. (Random House 2013, co-editor)
- Journals 1952-2000 Arthur M. Schlesinger, Jr. (Penguin Press 2007, co-editor)
- Act of Creation: The Founding of The United Nations (Westview Press 2003)
- Bitter Fruit: The Story of the U.S. Coup in Guatemala (Doubleday 1982, with Stephen Kinzer)
- The New Reformers (Houghton Mifflen 1975)
