= Cornelia James Cannon =

American feminist reformer and author (1876–1969)

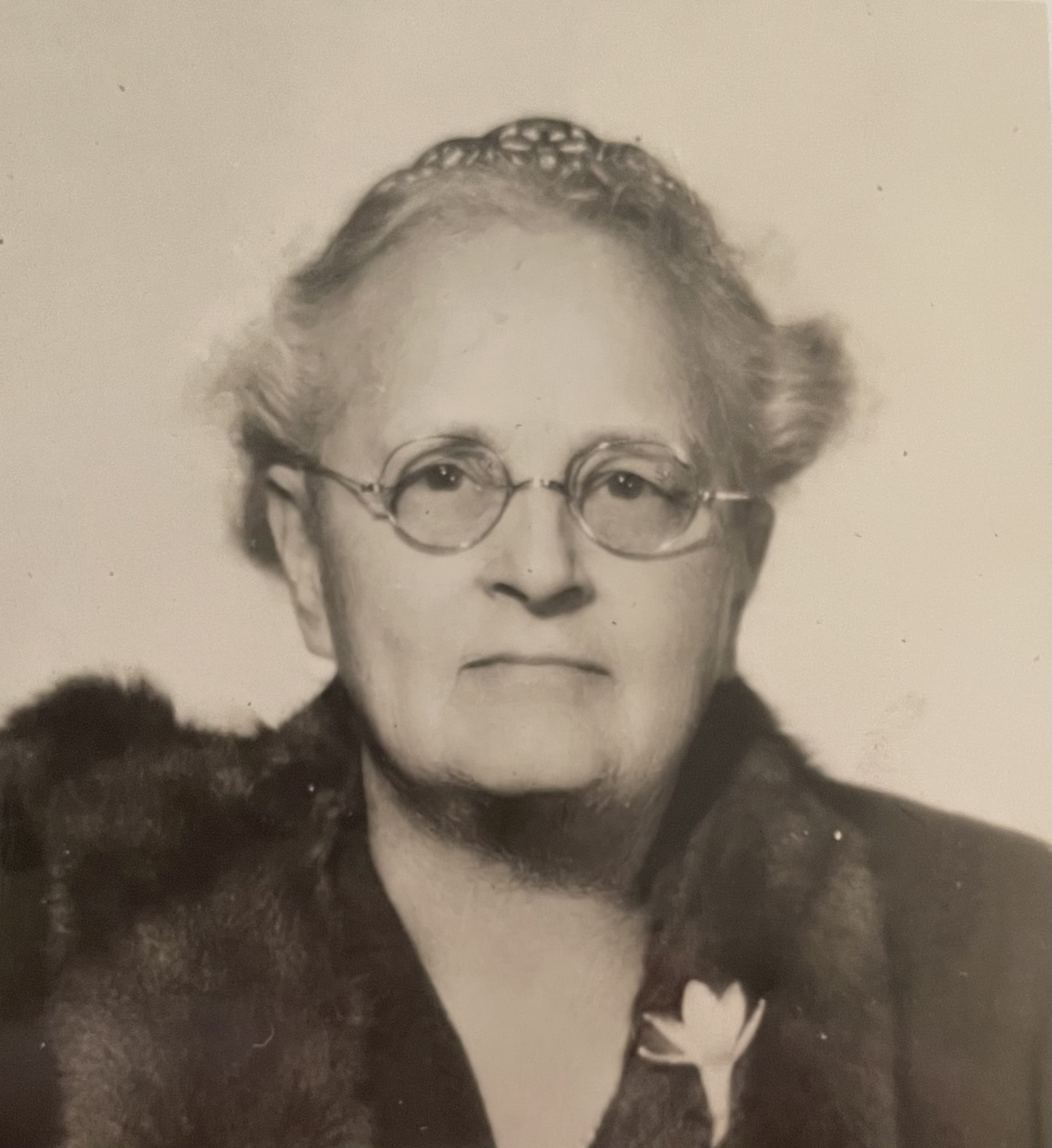
- Born: Cornelia James; November 17, 1876; Saint Paul, Minnesota, U.S.
- Died: December 7, 1969 (aged 93); Franklin, New Hampshire, U.S.
- Education: Radcliffe College
- Occupations: Writer, social reformer
- Spouse: Walter Bradford Cannon
- Children: 4, including Marian Cannon Schlesinger

Cornelia James Cannon (November 17, 1876 – December 7, 1969) was a feminist reformer and best-selling author of the novel Red Rust.

== Biography ==
Cornelia James was raised in Saint Paul, Minnesota and was a graduate of Radcliffe College. She was married to Walter Bradford Cannon, a professor at Harvard University. She was the mother of Marian Cannon Schlesinger, an author and artist.

Cannon was a progressive thinker and an advocate for women's rights, birth control, and public education. She wrote eight novels in total as well as numerous essays on controversial topics such as women's rights, birth control, and immigration policy. Cannon was active with Planned Parenthood, the League of Women Voters, and a local political association in Massachusetts.

In 2011, Maria I. Diedrich published a biography of Cannon, Cornelia James Cannon and the Future American Race, juxtaposing her life and work as a feminist reformer with her beliefs in eugenics in the context of the 1920s and 1930s.
