= George Alexander Kennedy =

George Alexander Kennedy may refer to:

- George A. Kennedy (sinologist) (1901–1960), American professor of Chinese at Yale University, 1938–1960
- George A. Kennedy (classicist) (born 1928), American classical scholar
