= Otto Franke (sinologist) =

German sinologist

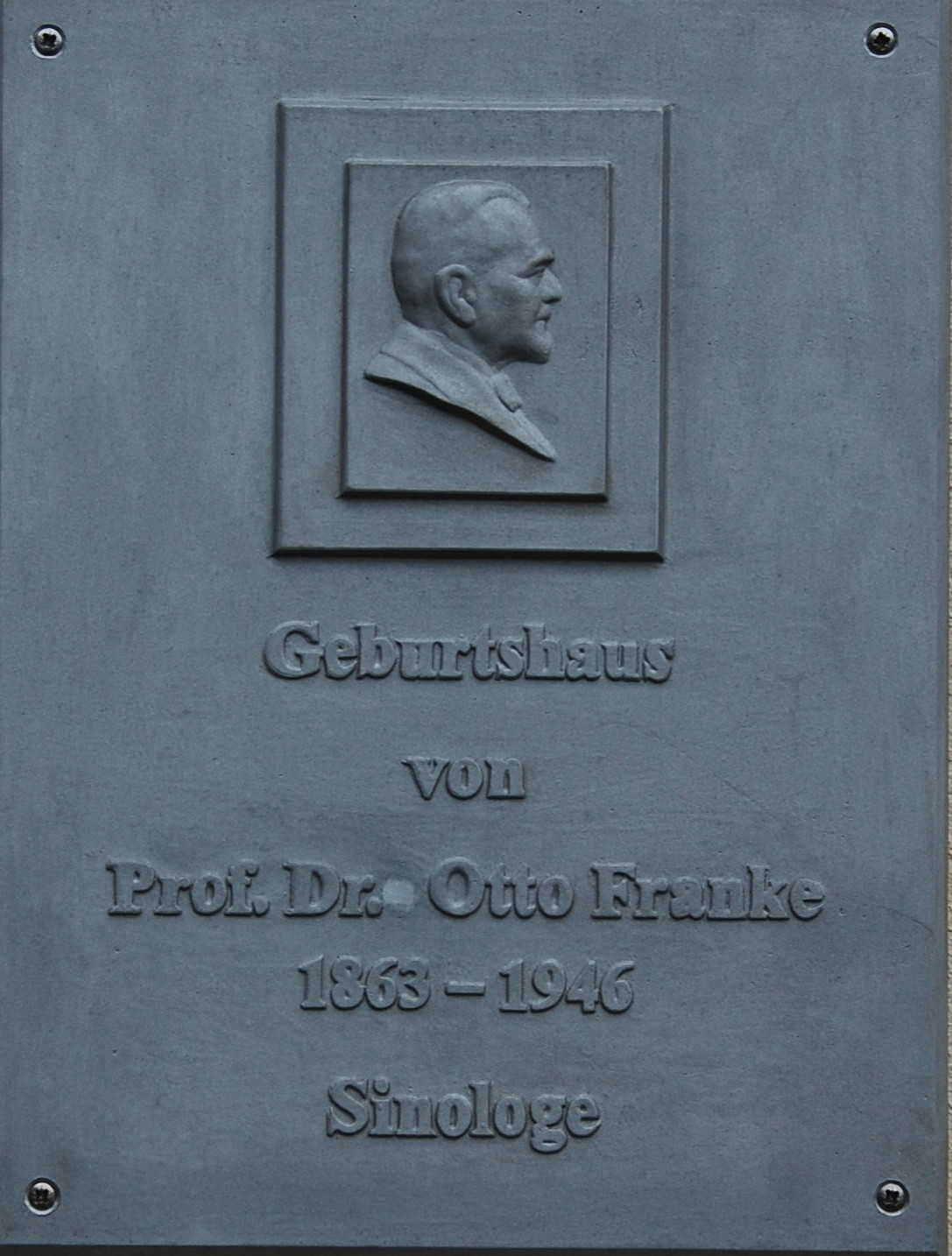
- Commemorative plaque for Otto Franke at his birth house in Gernrode
- Born: 27 September 1863; Gernrode, Anhalt-Dessau
- Died: 5 August 1946 (aged 82); Berlin, Germany
- Education: University of Freiburg, University of Göttingen
- Scientific career
- Fields: Chinese history
- Workplaces: University of Hamburg, Humboldt University of Berlin

Otto Franke (Chinese: 福蘭閣; pinyin: Fúlángé; 27 September 1863 – 5 August 1946) was a German diplomat, sinologist, and historian. He was the preeminent German sinologist of his time, called the "Nestor of German Sinology" by Hellmut Wilhelm. He served as a diplomat at the German embassy to the Qing empire for 13 years, before becoming the inaugural Sinology Chair at the University of Hamburg and then at the University of Berlin. His five-volume Geschichte des Chinesischen Reiches (History of the Chinese Empire), though unfinished because of World War II, remains the standard history of China in Germany decades after its publication. His son Wolfgang Franke was also a well-known sinologist who succeeded him as the Sinology Chair at Hamburg.

== Education and diplomatic career ==
Otto Franke was born 27 September 1863 in Gernrode, Harz. His father was the mayor of the town. He earned a bachelor's degree in history and comparative linguistics at the University of Freiburg. After serving in the military, he entered the graduate school of the University of Göttingen, studying Sanskrit, German history, law, and Chinese.

Although inclined toward an academic career, Franke was unable to pursue it at the time and instead found a job as an interpreter for the German embassy in Beijing, capital of the Qing Empire. He served for 13 years in China from 1888 to 1901 and traveled extensively in the country, as well as in Mongolia (then under Qing rule), Korea, and Japan. He kept diaries in the period which were later published.

== Academic career ==
After returning to Germany in 1902, he worked as a journalist covering Asian events, and as an advisor to the Qing embassy in Berlin. In 1910 he entered academia, becoming the inaugural chair of the Chinese Language and Culture department at the University of Hamburg. In 1913, he published his first major work, a translation of the Geng Zhi Tu (耕織圖), a Song dynasty Chinese manual for farming and sericulture. In 1920 he published a study of the Spring and Autumn Annals and the Zuozhuan, but it was later criticized by Bernhard Karlgren for its translation errors. Franke's student George Kennedy would improve upon this work in the 1930s.

Franke was hardworking; his son Wolfgang later recalled that he spent very little time with his family. By 1923, he had published more than 100 works, although some of them were in journalistic rather than academic publications. In that year, he was appointed chair of the Sinology department of the University of Berlin at the age of 60, succeeding J. J. M. de Groot. His seminar became a major center for German sinology, attracting scholars such as Wolfram Eberhard, Hellmut Wilhelm, Étienne Balazs, as well as his own son Wolfgang.

== History of the Qing Empire ==
In 1931, Franke retired at the age of 68, and was succeeded by Erich Haenisch as the sinology chair of Berlin. He devoted his retirement to researching and writing his magnum opus, Geschichte des Chinesischen Reiches (History of the Chinese Empire); the first volume was published in 1931. Soon afterward, the Nazi Party came to power in Germany and in 1933 nearly wiped out German sinology in its purging of universities. In 1935 Otto Franke became a member of the Göttingen Academy of Sciences and Humanities. By 1937, Franke had finished the third volume which covers Chinese history up to the Tang dynasty.

Soon World War II interceded and he did not complete the fourth volume, covering the Song and Yuan dynasties, until 1944. He wrote in the foreword of that volume explaining the delay: "The only reason is the terrible great war since 1939, the end of which is not to be seen anywhere. It not only made the required concentration difficult, but also increasingly limited my use of libraries, and finally made it altogether impossible. [...] My history of the Chinese empire remains but a torso [...] and I am not to finish the last volume."

Though unfinished, Geschichte des Chinesischen Reiches remains the standard history of China in Germany to this day. De Gruyter reprinted the work in 2001. A major contribution of Franke's history is to present China as a dynamic and changing entity, rejecting the view held by Hegel and Leopold von Ranke that Chinese history was mostly static.

== Death ==
After the surrender of Nazi Germany, Franke wrote in the addendum to his memoirs in October 1945: "As far as I can see there is no glimmer of hope in the dark clouds in the middle of this international storm, but I think to recognize in the gloomy light that verse of solace for the desperate: Una salus victis, nullam sperare salutem [The only hope for the doomed, is no hope at all]. Perhaps it will be granted to a later generation to experience a new German spring, today I can no longer muster faith in our people. I am grateful that only a very short distance separates me from the dark gate, and the only wish that moves my wife and myself is that we can pass it together to the end."

On 5 August 1946, Franke died at the age of 82, "practically from hunger and exhaustion" according to Hellmut Wilhelm. Swiss historian Marc Winter compares his end to that of French sinologist Henri Maspero, who died in the Buchenwald concentration camp: "Otto Franke lived to see the end of the war as an old and broken man, unable to finish his Geschichte des Chinesischen Reiches [...] his life was ruined like Maspero's, albeit in a less direct and criminal manner."

== Family ==
Otto Franke was married to Luise Niebuhr and they had three sons and a daughter. Two of their sons died in their teens. Their youngest child, Wolfgang Franke (1912–2007), became a sinologist and succeeded his father as sinology chair of the University of Hamburg.
