= Table of syllables in Palladius system =

Table of syllables used in Palladius cyrillization of Chinese

This article is a complete listing of syllables used in the Palladius system for the cyrillization of Standard Chinese. Each syllable in a cell is composed of an initial (columns) and a final (rows). An empty cell indicates that the corresponding syllable does not exist in Standard Chinese.

Nucleus and Coda		а	о	э	ай	эй	ао	оу	ань	энь	ан	эн
Medial	и	я	йо	е	яй		яо	ю	янь	инь	ян	ин
Medial	у	уа	уо		уай	уй			уань	унь	уан	ун
Medial	юй			юэ					юань	юнь		юн

The below table indicates possible combinations of initials and finals in Standard Chinese, but does not indicate tones, which are equally important to the proper pronunciation of Chinese. Although some initial-final combinations have some syllables using each of the five different tones, most do not. Some utilize only one tone. Finals are grouped into subsets а (a), и (i), у (u) and юй (ü).

Palladius table		Initials																						Palladius table	
Palladius table		∅	б	п	м	ф	д	т	н	л	г	к	х	цз	ц	с	чж	ч	ш	ж	цз	ц	с	Palladius table	
Group а Finals	и/ы																чжи	чи	ши	жи	цзы	цы	сы	и/ы	Group а Finals
Group а Finals	а	а	ба	па	ма	фа	да	та	на	ла	га	ка	ха				чжа	ча	ша		цза	ца	са	а	Group а Finals
Group а Finals	о	о	бо	по	мо	фо	до	то	но	ло	го	ко	хо				чжо	чо	шо	жо	цзо	цо	со	о	Group а Finals
Group а Finals	э	э			мэ		дэ	тэ	нэ	лэ	гэ	кэ	хэ				чжэ	чэ	шэ	жэ	цзэ	цэ	сэ	э	Group а Finals
Group а Finals	ай	ай	бай	пай	май		дай	тай	най	лай	гай	кай	хай				чжай	чай	шай		цзай	цай	сай	ай	Group а Finals
Group а Finals	эй	эй	бэй	пэй	мэй	фэй	дэй	тэй	нэй	лэй	гэй		хэй				чжэй		шэй		цзэй			эй	Group а Finals
Group а Finals	ао	ао	бао	пао	мао		дао	тао	нао	лао	гао	као	хао				чжао	чао	шао	жао	цзао	цао	сао	ао	Group а Finals
Group а Finals	оу	оу		поу	моу	фоу	доу	тоу	ноу	лоу	гоу	коу	хоу				чжоу	чоу	шоу	жоу	цзоу	цоу	соу	оу	Group а Finals
Group а Finals	ань	ань	бань	пань	мань	фань	дань	тань	нань	лань	гань	кань	хань				чжань	чань	шань	жаn	цзань	цань	сань	ань	Group а Finals
Group а Finals	энь	энь	бэнь	пэнь	мэнь	фэнь	дэнь		нэнь		гэнь	кэнь	хэнь				чжэнь	чэнь	шэнь	жэнь	цзэнь	цэнь	сэнь	энь	Group а Finals
Group а Finals	ан	ан	бан	пан	ман	фан	дан	тан	нан	лан	ган	кан	хан				чжан	чан	шан	жан	цзан	цан	сан	ан	Group а Finals
Group а Finals	эн	эн	бэн	пэн	мэн	фэн	дэн	тэн	нэн	лэн	гэн	кэн	хэн				чжэн	чэн	шэн	жэн	цзэн	цэн	сэн	эн	Group а Finals
Group а Finals	эр	эр																						эр	Group а Finals
Group и Finals	и	и	би	пи	ми		ди	ти	ни	ли				цзи	ци	си								и	Group и Finals
Group и Finals	я	я					дя			ля				цзя	ця	ся								я	Group и Finals
Group и Finals	йо	йо																						йо	Group и Finals
Group и Finals	е	е	бе	пе	ме		де	те	не	ле				цзе	це	се								е	Group и Finals
Group и Finals	яй	яй																						яй	Group и Finals
Group и Finals	яо	яо	бяо	пяо	мяо		дяо	тяо	няо	ляо				цзяо	цяо	сяо								яо	Group и Finals
Group и Finals	ю	ю			мю		дю		ню	лю				цзю	цю	сю								ю	Group и Finals
Group и Finals	янь	янь	бянь	пянь	мянь		дянь	тянь	нянь	лянь				цзянь	цянь	сянь								янь	Group и Finals
Group и Finals	инь	инь	бинь	пинь	минь				нинь	линь				цзинь	цинь	синь								инь	Group и Finals
Group и Finals	ян	ян							нян	лян				цзян	цян	сян								ян	Group и Finals
Group и Finals	ин	ин	бин	пин	мин		дин	тин	нин	лин				цзин	цин	син								ин	Group и Finals
Group у Finals	у	у	бу	пу	му	фу	ду	ту	ну	лу	гу	ку	ху				чжу	чу	шу	жу	цзу	цу	су	у	Group у Finals
Group у Finals	уа	ва									гуа	куа	хуа				чжуа	чуа	шуа	жуа				уа	Group у Finals
Group у Finals	уо	во																						уо	Group у Finals
Group у Finals	уай	вай									гуай	куай	хуай				чжуай	чуай	шуай					уай	Group у Finals
Group у Finals	уй	вэй					дуй	туй			гуй	куй	хуэй				чжуй	чуй	шуй	жуй	цзуй	цуй	суй	уй	Group у Finals
Group у Finals	уань	вань					дуань	туань	нуань	луань	гуань	куань	хуань				чжуань	чуань	шуань	жуань	цзуань	цуань	суань	уань	Group у Finals
Group у Finals	унь	вэнь					дунь	тунь	нунь	лунь	гунь	кунь	хунь				чжунь	чунь	шунь	жунь	цзунь	цунь	сунь	унь	Group у Finals
Group у Finals	уан	ван									гуан	куан	хуан				чжуан	чуан	шуан					уан	Group у Finals
Group у Finals	ун	вэн					дун	тун	нун	лун	гун	кун	хун				чжун	чун		жун	цзун	цун	сун	ун	Group у Finals
Group юй Finals	юй	юй							нюй	люй				цзюй	цюй	сюй								юй	Group юй Finals
Group юй Finals	юэ	юэ							нюэ	люэ				цзюэ	цюэ	сюэ								юэ	Group юй Finals
Group юй Finals	юань	юань												цзюань	цюань	сюань								юань	Group юй Finals
Group юй Finals	юнь	юнь												цзюнь	цюнь	сюнь								юнь	Group юй Finals
Group юй Finals	юн	юн												цзюн	цюн	сюн								юн	Group юй Finals
Palladius table		∅	б	п	м	ф	д	т	н	л	г	к	х	цз	ц	с	чж	ч	ш	ж	цз	ц	с	Palladius table	
Palladius table		Initials																						Palladius table	

Syllables with final о have multiple counterparts in different romanization systems

IPA	pu̯ɔ	pʰu̯ɔ	mu̯ɔ	fu̯ɔ	tu̯ɔ	tʰu̯ɔ	nu̯ɔ	lu̯ɔ	ku̯ɔ	kʰu̯ɔ	xu̯ɔ	ʈʂu̯ɔ	ʈʂʰu̯ɔ	ʂu̯ɔ	ʐu̯ɔ	ʦu̯ɔ	ʦʰu̯ɔ	su̯ɔ
Palladius	бо	по	мо	фо	до	то	но	ло	го	ко	хо	чжо	чо	шо	жо	цзо	цо	со
Wade–Giles	po	p'o	mo	fo	to	t'o	no	lo	kuo	k'uo	huo	cho	ch'o	shuo	jo	tso	ts'o	so
Pinyin	bo	po	mo	fo	duo	tuo	nuo	luo	guo	kuo	huo	zhuo	chuo	shuo	ruo	zuo	cuo	suo
Bopomofo	ㄅㄛ	ㄆㄛ	ㄇㄛ	ㄈㄛ	ㄉㄨㄛ	ㄊㄨㄛ	ㄋㄨㄛ	ㄌㄨㄛ	ㄍㄨㄛ	ㄎㄨㄛ	ㄏㄨㄛ	ㄓㄨㄛ	ㄔㄨㄛ	ㄕㄨㄛ	ㄖㄨㄛ	ㄗㄨㄛ	ㄘㄨㄛ	ㄙㄨㄛ

== See also ==
- Cyrillization of Chinese
- Pinyin table
- Wade–Giles table
- Zhuyin table
