= Wade–Giles table =

Table of all possible syllables of Standard Mandarin

This Wade–Giles table is a complete listing of all Wade–Giles syllables used in Standard Chinese. Each syllable in a cell is composed of an initial (columns) and a final (rows). An empty cell indicates that the corresponding syllable does not exist in Standard Chinese.

The below table indicates possible combinations of initials and finals in Standard Chinese, but does not indicate tones, which are equally important to the proper pronunciation of Chinese. Although some initial-final combinations occur with each of the five different tones, most do not. Some only occur with one tone.

Finals are grouped into subsets a, i, u and ü. i, u and ü groupings indicate a combination of those finals with finals from Group a. The following exceptions exist:

| Group | Special combination | | | | | |
|---|---|---|---|---|---|---|
| i | i+ê/o=ieh | | i+ou=iu | i+an=ien | i+ên=in | i+êng=ing |
| u | u+ê/o=o/uo | u+ei=ui/uei | | | u+ên=un | u+êng=ung |
| ü | ü+ê/o=üeh | | | | ü+ên=ün | ü+êng=iung |

Most syllables are a combination of an initial and a final. However, some syllables have no initials. These are written in Wade–Giles according to the following rules:

- if the final begins with a u, replace the u with a w
- if the final begins with an ü, add y in the beginning (no exceptions)
- if the final begins with an i, replace the i with a y if there are other vowels; if there are no other vowels, add y in the beginning
- if the final begins in any other way, keep the final as is
- exceptions to the rules above are indicated by blue in the table's no initial column:

| Wade–Giles table | | Initials | | | | | | | | | | | | | | | | | | | | | | Wade–Giles table | |
| Wade–Giles table | | ∅ | p | pʻ | m | f | t | tʻ | n | l | k | kʻ | h | ch | chʻ | hs | ch | chʻ | sh | j | ts | tsʻ | s | Wade–Giles table | |
|---|---|---|---|---|---|---|---|---|---|---|---|---|---|---|---|---|---|---|---|---|---|---|---|---|---|
| Group a Finals | ih/ŭ | | | | | | | | | | | | | | | | chih | chʻih | shih | jih | tzŭ | tzʻŭ | ssŭ | ih/ŭ | Group a Finals |
| Group a Finals | a | a | pa | pʻa | ma | fa | ta | tʻa | na | la | ka | kʻa | ha | | | | cha | chʻa | sha | | tsa | tsʻa | sa | a | Group a Finals |
| Group a Finals | ê/o | ê/o | | | mê | | tê | tʻê | nê | lê | ko | kʻo | ho | | | | chê | chʻê | shê | jê | tsê | tsʻê | sê | ê/o | Group a Finals |
| Group a Finals | ai | ai | pai | pʻai | mai | | tai | tʻai | nai | lai | kai | kʻai | hai | | | | chai | chʻai | shai | | tsai | tsʻai | sai | ai | Group a Finals |
| Group a Finals | ei | ei | pei | pʻei | mei | fei | tei | tʻei | nei | lei | kei | | hei | | | | chei | | shei | | tsei | | | ei | Group a Finals |
| Group a Finals | ao | ao | pao | pʻao | mao | | tao | tʻao | nao | lao | kao | kʻao | hao | | | | chao | chʻao | shao | jao | tsao | tsʻao | sao | ao | Group a Finals |
| Group a Finals | ou | ou | | pʻou | mou | fou | tou | tʻou | nou | lou | kou | kʻou | hou | | | | chou | chʻou | shou | jou | tsou | tsʻou | sou | ou | Group a Finals |
| Group a Finals | an | an | pan | pʻan | man | fan | tan | tʻan | nan | lan | kan | kʻan | han | | | | chan | chʻan | shan | jan | tsan | tsʻan | san | an | Group a Finals |
| Group a Finals | ên | ên | pên | pʻên | mên | fên | tên | | nên | | kên | kʻên | hên | | | | chên | chʻên | shên | jên | tsên | tsʻên | sên | ên | Group a Finals |
| Group a Finals | ang | ang | pang | pʻang | mang | fang | tang | tʻang | nang | lang | kang | kʻang | hang | | | | chang | chʻang | shang | jang | tsang | tsʻang | sang | ang | Group a Finals |
| Group a Finals | êng | êng | pêng | pʻêng | mêng | fêng | têng | tʻêng | nêng | lêng | kêng | kʻêng | hêng | | | | chêng | chʻêng | shêng | jêng | tsêng | tsʻêng | sêng | êng | Group a Finals |
| Group a Finals | êrh | êrh | | | | | | | | | | | | | | | | | | | | | | êrh | Group a Finals |
| Group i Finals | i | i/yi | pi | pʻi | mi | | ti | tʻi | ni | li | | | | chi | chʻi | hsi | | | | | | | | i | Group i Finals |
| Group i Finals | ia | ya | | | | | tia | | | lia | | | | chia | chʻia | hsia | | | | | | | | ia | Group i Finals |
| Group i Finals | ieh | yeh | pieh | pʻieh | mieh | | tieh | tʻieh | nieh | lieh | | | | chieh | chʻieh | hsieh | | | | | | | | ieh | Group i Finals |
| Group i Finals | iai | yai | | | | | | | | | | | | | | | | | | | | | | iai | Group i Finals |
| Group i Finals | iao | yao | piao | pʻiao | miao | | tiao | tʻiao | niao | liao | | | | chiao | chʻiao | hsiao | | | | | | | | iao | Group i Finals |
| Group i Finals | iu | yu | | | miu | | tiu | | niu | liu | | | | chiu | chʻiu | hsiu | | | | | | | | iu | Group i Finals |
| Group i Finals | ien | yen | pien | pʻien | mien | | tien | tʻien | nien | lien | | | | chien | chʻien | hsien | | | | | | | | ien | Group i Finals |
| Group i Finals | in | yin | pin | pʻin | min | | | | nin | lin | | | | chin | chʻin | hsin | | | | | | | | in | Group i Finals |
| Group i Finals | iang | yang | | | | | | | niang | liang | | | | chiang | chʻiang | hsiang | | | | | | | | iang | Group i Finals |
| Group i Finals | ing | ying | ping | pʻing | ming | | ting | tʻing | ning | ling | | | | ching | chʻing | hsing | | | | | | | | ing | Group i Finals |
| Group u Finals | u | wu | pu | pʻu | mu | fu | tu | tʻu | nu | lu | ku | kʻu | hu | | | | chu | chʻu | shu | ju | tsu | tsʻu | su | u | Group u Finals |
| Group u Finals | ua | wa | | | | | | | | | kua | kʻua | hua | | | | chua | chʻua | shua | jua | | | | ua | Group u Finals |
| Group u Finals | o/uo | wo | po | pʻo | mo | fo | to | tʻo | no | lo | kuo | kʻuo | huo | | | | cho | chʻo/chʻuo | shuo | jo | tso | tsʻo | so | o/uo | Group u Finals |
| Group u Finals | uai | wai | | | | | | | | | kuai | kʻuai | huai | | | | chuai | chʻuai | shuai | | | | | uai | Group u Finals |
| Group u Finals | ui/uei | wei | | | | | tui | tʻui | | | kuei | kʻuei | hui | | | | chui | chʻui | shui | jui | tsui | tsʻui | sui | ui/uei | Group u Finals |
| Group u Finals | uan | wan | | | | | tuan | tʻuan | nuan | luan | kuan | kʻuan | huan | | | | chuan | chʻuan | shuan | juan | tsuan | tsʻuan | suan | uan | Group u Finals |
| Group u Finals | un | wên | | | | | tun | tʻun | nun | lun | kun | kʻun | hun | | | | chun | chʻun | shun | jun | tsun | tsʻun | sun | un | Group u Finals |
| Group u Finals | uang | wang | | | | | | | | | kuang | kʻuang | huang | | | | chuang | chʻuang | shuang | | | | | uang | Group u Finals |
| Group u Finals | ung | wêng | | | | | tung | tʻung | nung | lung | kung | kʻung | hung | | | | chung | chʻung | | jung | tsung | tsʻung | sung | ung | Group u Finals |
| Group ü Finals | ü | yü | | | | | | | nü | lü | | | | chü | chʻü | hsü | | | | | | | | ü | Group ü Finals |
| Group ü Finals | üeh | yüeh | | | | | | | nüeh | lüeh | | | | chüeh | chʻüeh | hsüeh | | | | | | | | üeh | Group ü Finals |
| Group ü Finals | üan | yüan | | | | | | | | lüan | | | | chüan | chʻüan | hsüan | | | | | | | | üan | Group ü Finals |
| Group ü Finals | ün | yün | | | | | | | | | | | | chün | chʻün | hsün | | | | | | | | ün | Group ü Finals |
| Group ü Finals | iung | yung | | | | | | | | | | | | chiung | chʻiung | hsiung | | | | | | | | iung | Group ü Finals |
| Wade–Giles table | | ∅ | p | pʻ | m | f | t | tʻ | n | l | k | kʻ | h | ch | chʻ | hs | ch | chʻ | sh | j | ts | tsʻ | s | Wade–Giles table | |
| Wade–Giles table | | Initials | | | | | | | | | | | | | | | | | | | | | | Wade–Giles table | |

Colour Legend:

| "regular" initial or final Final is in Group a or is a direct combination of: i+Group a final; u+Group a final; ü+Group a final | Final of i, u, ü groups is a modified combination of: i+Group a final; u+Group a final; ü+Group a final | syllable is direct combination of initial and final (or follows rules for no-initial syllables outlined at the top of the page) | syllable is written with the less common of the two spellings of the final; note the special spelling of the initials ts, tsʻ, s in the syllables tzŭ, tzʻŭ, ssŭ, and the two variants chʻo and chʻuo. |

Syllables that end with o have either the o/uo final or the ê/o final:

| IPA | pu̯ɔ | pʰu̯ɔ | mu̯ɔ | fu̯ɔ | tu̯ɔ | tʰu̯ɔ | nu̯ɔ | lu̯ɔ | kɤ | kʰɤ | xɤ | ku̯ɔ | kʰu̯ɔ | xu̯ɔ | ʈʂu̯ɔ | ʈʂʰu̯ɔ | ʂu̯ɔ | ʐu̯ɔ | ʦu̯ɔ | ʦʰu̯ɔ | su̯ɔ | ɤ | u̯ɔ |
| Wade–Giles | po | pʻo | mo | fo | to | tʻo | no | lo | ko | kʻo | ho | kuo | kʻuo | huo | cho | chʻo | shuo | jo | tso | tsʻo | so | o/ê | wo |
| Bopomofo | ㄅㄛ | ㄆㄛ | ㄇㄛ | ㄈㄛ | ㄉㄨㄛ | ㄊㄨㄛ | ㄋㄨㄛ | ㄌㄨㄛ | ㄍㄜ | ㄎㄜ | ㄏㄜ | ㄍㄨㄛ | ㄎㄨㄛ | ㄏㄨㄛ | ㄓㄨㄛ | ㄔㄨㄛ | ㄕㄨㄛ | ㄖㄨㄛ | ㄗㄨㄛ | ㄘㄨㄛ | ㄙㄨㄛ | ㄜ | ㄨㄛ |
| Pinyin | bo | po | mo | fo | duo | tuo | nuo | luo | ge | ke | he | guo | kuo | huo | zhuo | chuo | shuo | ruo | zuo | cuo | suo | e | wo |

== See also ==
- Wade–Giles
- Pinyin table
- Palladius table
- Zhuyin table
