= Wolfgang Franke =

German sinologist (1912–2007)

Wolfgang Leopold Friedrich Franke
- Born: 24 July 1912; Hamburg, Kingdom of Prussia, German Empire
- Died: 6 September 2007 (aged 95); Berlin, Germany

Academic background
- Education: Humboldt University of Berlin; University of Hamburg

Academic work
- Discipline: History
- Sub-discipline: Sinology
- Institutions: University of Hamburg; Sichuan University; Peking University

Wolfgang Leopold Friedrich Franke (Chinese: 傅吾康; pinyin: Fù Wúkāng; 24 July 1912 – 6 September 2007) was a German sinologist whose research was focused on the history of the Ming dynasty and of the Chinese diaspora in Southeast Asia. He served as Chair of Sinology at the University of Hamburg for 27 years. His father Otto Franke, also a sinologist, had set up the chair in 1910.

== Biography ==
Wolfgang Franke was born in Hamburg on 24 July 1912, the fourth and youngest child of the prominent sinologist Otto Franke and his wife Luise Niebuhr. He had a sister, as well as two brothers who died in their teens.

Franke graduated from the Grunewald Gymnasium in Berlin, and studied sinology at the University of Berlin from 1931 to 1934, but transferred in his final year to the University of Hamburg where he studied under Fritz Jäger. He received his doctorate degree in 1935, with a dissertation on the 1898 Hundred Days' Reform of Kang Youwei.

After serving in the military for a year, Franke left for China, arriving in Shanghai on 18 May 1937, just before the Battle of Shanghai and the Second Sino-Japanese War began. From 1937 to 1945 he worked as a research assistant at the German Institute (Deutschland-Institut) in Beijing, thus avoided being drafted into the German Army in the Second World War, during which many of his friends were killed. In his autobiography, he writes that "I had the feelings of having lived here in my previous life and felt from the first day on at home."

In 1941 Franke fell in love with Hu Junyin (Chinese: 胡隽吟; Wade–Giles: Hu Chün-yin; 1910–1988), the daughter of a Chinese scholar who had studied in Germany. However, because of Nazi Germany's prohibition of interracial marriage, they did not marry until March 1945, near the end of World War II. They had a son and a daughter.

After the end of World War II, he became a professor at Sichuan University and the private West China Union College in Chengdu, teaching Ming history and German history. Two years later, he became a professor of German language at Peking University.

When peace was restored in post-war Germany, Franke returned to Hamburg with his family in 1950. He was appointed Chair of Sinology at the University of Hamburg, and was also Director of the Seminar for Language and Culture in China. He was the fourth holder of the Chair of Sinology and succeeded his father Otto Franke, who had set up the chair in 1910. He worked there until his retirement in 1977.

After his wife died in 1988, Franke moved to Petaling Jaya near the University of Malaya, where he had students and friends. He lived in Malaysia until his late eighties, when he moved to Berlin in May 2000 to live with his daughter. In his final years, when he could no longer travel, his daughter hired Chinese students to look after him, so that he could speak Chinese to someone. He died in Berlin on 6 September 2007, at the age of 95.

== Publications ==
Franke was internationally known as a China expert with research focuses on the Ming dynasty and history of the Chinese in Southeast Asia. He worked in various national and international committees on China and Asia studies and was a member of the university club of the University of Hamburg.

Important works by Franke include:

- Das Jahrhundert der chinesischen Revolution 1851-1949, München (1958). English translation: A Century of Chinese Revolution 1851–1949, Oxford (1970).
- The Reform and Abolition of the Traditional Chinese Examination System, Harvard University Press, 1960.
- China und das Abendland (1962). English translation: China and the West (1962).
- An Introduction to the Sources of Ming History (1968). Chinese translation: 明代史籍彙考引言 (1970).
- China-Handbuch (China Handbook) (1974).

He also wrote a two-volume autobiography Im Banne Chinas (Under the Spell of China; part 1: 1912–1950 and part 2: 1950–1998). From the mid-1960s onwards, he dealt intensively with scholars in Southeast Asia and collected epigraphic material. The results of his research were published in English in several volumes for Malaysia 1983–87, Indonesia 1997 and Thailand 1998.
