= Yale romanization of Mandarin =

Romanization system for Mandarin Chinese

The Yale romanization of Mandarin is a system for transcribing the sounds of Standard Chinese, based on the Beijing dialect of Mandarin. It was devised in 1943 by the Yale sinologist George Kennedy for a course teaching Chinese to American soldiers, and was popularized by continued development of that course at Yale. The system approximated Chinese sounds using English spelling conventions, in order to accelerate acquisition of correct pronunciation by English speakers.

The Yale romanization was widely used in Western textbooks until the late 1970s. In fact, during the height of the Cold War, the use outside of China of pinyin rather than Yale romanization was regarded as a political statement or identification with the communist Chinese regime. The situation was reversed once relations between the People's Republic of China and the West had improved. Communist China (PRC) became a member of the United Nations in 1971, replacing Nationalist China (ROC). By 1979, much of the world adopted pinyin as the standard romanization for Chinese geographical names, becoming an ISO standard in 1982. Interest in Yale Mandarin declined rapidly thereafter.

== Initials and finals ==
The tables below show the Yale Mandarin representation of each Chinese sound (in bold type), together with the corresponding IPA phonetic symbol (in square brackets), and equivalent representations in bopomofo and pinyin.

=== Initials ===
In Mandarin, stop and affricate consonants are all voiceless, but show a contrast between an aspirated and unaspirated series. A much-criticized feature of the Wade–Giles system was its use of an apostrophe to indicate aspiration, as in the syllable t'a contrasting with the unaspirated ta.

The corresponding Yale spellings, ta and da respectively, suggest an approximation of the aspiration distinction to speakers of English, in which (unlike, say, Romance languages) voiceless consonants like t are pronounced with distinct aspiration when they occur at the start of a word, but voiced ones like d are pronounced unaspirated and with weakened voicing in that position. Similar conventions were used in the earlier Gwoyeu Romatzyh system and the later pinyin system.

The Yale system, like Wade–Giles and Gwoyeu Romatzyh, represents palatal consonants using letters for the similar retroflex sounds with which they are in complementary distribution, aside from sy for /ɕ/. That is more intuitive for English speakers than the pinyin usage of the letters q and x, which no longer carry their values expected in English text. For example, q in pinyin is pronounced something like the ch in chicken and is written as ch in Yale Romanization. Xi in pinyin is pronounced something like English see; in Yale it is written as syi.

		Labial	Alveolar	Retroflex	Alveolo-palatal	Velar
Nasal		**m** [m] ㄇ m	**n** [n] ㄋ n			
Plosive	Unaspirated	**b** [p] ㄅ b	**d** [t] ㄉ d			**g** [k] ㄍ g
Plosive	Aspirated	**p** [pʰ] ㄆ p	**t** [tʰ] ㄊ t			**k** [kʰ] ㄎ k
Affricate	Unaspirated		**dz** [ts] ㄗ z	**j** [ʈʂ] ㄓ zh	**j** [tɕ] ㄐ j	
Affricate	Aspirated		**ts** [tsʰ] ㄘ c	**ch** [ʈʂʰ] ㄔ ch	**ch** [tɕʰ] ㄑ q	
Fricative		**f** [f] ㄈ f	**s** [s] ㄙ s	**sh** [ʂ] ㄕ sh	**sy** [ɕ] ㄒ x	**h** [x] ㄏ h
Liquid			**l** [l] ㄌ l	**r** [ɻ~ʐ] ㄖ r		

=== Finals ===
Nucleus		a					ə						∅
Coda		∅	i	u	n	ŋ	∅	i	u	n	ŋ	ɻ	∅
Medial	∅	**a** [a] ㄚ a	**ai** [ai] ㄞ ai	**au** [au] ㄠ ao	**an** [an] ㄢ an	**ang** [aŋ] ㄤ ang	**e** [ɤ] ㄜ e	**ei** [ei] ㄟ ei	**ou** [ou] ㄡ ou	**en** [ən] ㄣ en	**eng** [əŋ] ㄥ eng	**er** [aɚ] ㄦ er	**r/z** [ɨ] ㄭ -i
Medial	i	**ya** [ja] ㄧㄚ ia		**yau** [jau] ㄧㄠ iao	**yan** [jɛn] ㄧㄢ ian	**yang** [jaŋ] ㄧㄤ iang	**ye** [je] ㄧㄝ ie		**you** [jou] ㄧㄡ iu	**in** [in] ㄧㄣ in	**ing** [iŋ] ㄧㄥ ing		**i** [i] ㄧ i
Medial	u	**wa** [wa] ㄨㄚ ua	**wai** [wai] ㄨㄞ uai		**wan** [wan] ㄨㄢ uan	**wang** [waŋ] ㄨㄤ uang	**wo** [wo] ㄨㄛ uo	**wei** [wei] ㄨㄟ ui		**wun** [wən] ㄨㄣ un	**ung** [ʊŋ] ㄨㄥ ong		**u** [u] ㄨ u
Medial	y				**ywan** [ɥɛn] ㄩㄢ üan		**ywe** [ɥe] ㄩㄝ üe			**yun** [yn] ㄩㄣ ün	**yung** [jʊŋ] ㄩㄥ iong		**yu** [y] ㄩ ü

Syllables with syllabic fricatives are spelled jr (ㄓ zhi), chr (ㄔ chi), shr (ㄕ shi), r (ㄖ ri), dz (ㄗ zi), tsz (ㄘ ci), sz (ㄙ si), suggesting approximate pronunciations to English speakers. In pinyin, these are all spelled -i. For example, "knowledge" (知識) is spelled chih-shih in Wade–Giles and zhīshì in pinyin, but in Yale romanization it is written jr-shr—only the last will elicit a near-correct pronunciation from an unprepared English speaker.

== Tones ==
Tone was marked using diacritics, the shape of which suggested the corresponding pitch contour: ā (high level), á (rising), ǎ (falling-rising) and à (falling). The same method was adopted by pinyin.

The dash (-) is used to divide syllables, indicating that syllable-final ng before a vowel is pronounced /ŋ/ where it could be read as two separate syllables ending with /n/ and beginning with /k/; for instance, /ʈ͡ʂʰaŋ˧˥ an˥/ is spelt Cháng-ān.

== See also ==
- Yale romanization of Cantonese
- Yale romanization of Korean
- Comparison of Chinese transcription systems
