= Pinyin table =

Table of all sounds in Standard Chinese

This pinyin table is a complete listing of all Hanyu Pinyin syllables used in Standard Chinese. Each syllable in a cell is composed of an initial (columns) and a final (rows). An empty cell indicates that the corresponding syllable does not exist in Standard Chinese.

The below table indicates possible combinations of initials and finals in Standard Chinese, but does not indicate tones, which are equally important to the proper pronunciation of Chinese. Although some initial-final combinations have some syllables using each of the four different tones, most do not. Some utilize only one tone.

Pinyin entries in this page can be compared to syllables using the (unromanized) Zhuyin phonetic system in the Zhuyin table page.

Finals are grouped into subsets a, i, u and ü.

i, u and ü groupings indicate a combination of those finals with finals from Group a. Certain combinations are treated in a special way:

Group	Special combination				
i	i + ê = ie	i + ou = iu		i + en = in	i + eng = ing
u			u + ei = ui	u + en = un	u + eng = ong
ü	ü + ê = üe			ü + en = ün	ü + eng = iong

Most syllables are a combination of an initial and a final. However, some syllables have no initials. This is shown in Pinyin as follows:

- if the syllable begins with an i, it is replaced with a y
- if the syllable begins with an u, it is replaced with a w
- if the syllable begins with an ü, it is replaced with yu
- exceptions to the rules above are indicated by yellow in the table's no initial column:

Note that the y, w, and yu replacements above do not change the pronunciation of the final in the final-only syllable. They are used to avoid ambiguity when writing words in pinyin. For example, instead of:

- "uan" and "ian" forming "uanian", which could be interpreted as:
  - "uan-ian"
  - "uan-i-an" or
  - "u-an-i-an"
- the syllables are instead written "wan" and "yan", which results in the more distinct "wanyan".

There are discrepancies between the Bopomofo tables and the pinyin table due to some minor differences between the Mainland standard, putonghua, and the Taiwanese standard, guoyu, in the standard readings of characters. For example, the variant sounds 挼 (ruá; ㄖㄨㄚˊ), 扽 (dèn; ㄉㄣˋ), 忒 (tēi; ㄊㄟ) are not used in guoyu. Likewise the variant sound 孿 (lüán; ㄌㄩㄢˊ) is not recognized in putonghua, or it is folded into (luán; ㄌㄨㄢˊ). A few readings reflect a Standard Chinese approximation of a regionalism that is otherwise never encountered in either putonghua or guoyu. For instance, 覅 (fiào; ㄈㄧㄠˋ) is a borrowing from Shanghainese (and other dialects of Wu Chinese) that are commonly used, and are thus included in most large dictionaries, even though it is usually labeled as a nonstandard regionalism (方, short for 方言 (topolect)), with the local reading viau [vjɔ], which is approximated in Standard Chinese as fiào.

== Overall table ==
Syllables in italics are considered nonstandard, and only exist in the form of regionalisms, neologisms or slang.

Pinyin table		Initials																						Pinyin table	
Pinyin table		∅	b	p	m	f	d	t	n	l	g	k	h	j	q	x	zh	ch	sh	r	z	c	s	Pinyin table	
Group a Finals	∅																zhi	chi	shi	ri	zi	ci	si	∅	Group a Finals
Group a Finals	a	a	ba	pa	ma	fa	da	ta	na	la	ga (Note: See 嘎.)	ka	ha				zha	cha	sha		za	ca	sa	a	Group a Finals
Group a Finals	o	o (Note: See 哦.)								lo (Note: See 咯.)														o	Group a Finals
Group a Finals	e	e			me (Note: See 麼.)		de	te	ne	le	ge	ke	he				zhe	che	she	re	ze	ce	se	e	Group a Finals
Group a Finals	ê	ê (Note: See 誒.)																						ê	Group a Finals
Group a Finals	ai	ai	bai	pai	mai	fai (Note: See the neologism WiFi (wāifài).)	dai	tai	nai	lai	gai	kai	hai				zhai	chai	shai		zai	cai	sai	ai	Group a Finals
Group a Finals	ei	ei (Note: See 欸.)	bei	pei	mei	fei	dei (Note: See 得.)	tei (Note: See 忒.)	nei	lei	gei	kei (Note: See 剋.) (Note: See http://research.chtsai.org/papers/pinyin-xref.html)	hei				zhei (Note: See 這.)		shei		zei	cei (Note: See 𤭢.)	sei (Note: See 塞 and the neologism C.)	ei	Group a Finals
Group a Finals	ao	ao	bao	pao	mao		dao	tao	nao	lao	gao	kao	hao				zhao	chao	shao	rao	zao	cao	sao	ao	Group a Finals
Group a Finals	ou	ou		pou (Note: See 剖.)	mou	fou	dou	tou	nou (Note: See 耨.)	lou	gou	kou	hou				zhou	chou	shou	rou	zou	cou	sou	ou	Group a Finals
Group a Finals	an	an	ban	pan	man	fan	dan	tan	nan	lan	gan	kan	han				zhan	chan	shan	ran	zan	can	san	an	Group a Finals
Group a Finals	en	en	ben	pen	men	fen	den (Note: See 扽.)		nen	len (Note: See 啉.)	gen	ken	hen				zhen	chen	shen	ren	zen (Note: See 怎.)	cen (Note: See 岑.)	sen	en	Group a Finals
Group a Finals	ang	ang	bang	pang	mang	fang	dang	tang	nang	lang	gang	kang	hang				zhang	chang	shang	rang	zang	cang	sang	ang	Group a Finals
Group a Finals	eng	eng (Note: See 鞥.)	beng	peng	meng	feng	deng	teng	neng	leng	geng	keng	heng				zheng	cheng	sheng	reng	zeng	ceng	seng	eng	Group a Finals
Group a Finals	er	er																						er	Group a Finals
Group i Finals	i	yi	bi	pi	mi		di	ti	ni	li				ji	qi	xi								i	Group i Finals
Group i Finals	ia	ya		pia (Note: See 啪.)			dia (Note: See 嗲.)		nia (Note: See 㖸.)	lia (Note: See 倆.)				jia	qia	xia								ia	Group i Finals
Group i Finals	io	yo (Note: See 唷.)																						io	Group i Finals
Group i Finals	ie (iê)	ye	bie	pie	mie		die	tie	nie	lie				jie	qie	xie								ie (iê)	Group i Finals
Group i Finals	iai	yai (Note: See the Taiwan variant pronunciations of e.g. 厓, 崖, 睚, 啀.)																						iai	Group i Finals
Group i Finals	iao	yao	biao	piao	miao	fiao (Note: See 𧟰.)	diao	tiao	niao	liao				jiao	qiao	xiao								iao	Group i Finals
Group i Finals	iu (iou)	you			miu (Note: See 謬.)		diu		niu	liu		kiu (Note: See the neologism Q.)		jiu	qiu	xiu								iu (iou)	Group i Finals
Group i Finals	ian	yan	bian	pian	mian		dian	tian	nian	lian				jian	qian	xian								ian	Group i Finals
Group i Finals	in (ien)	yin	bin	pin	min		din (Note: See 𨈖.)		nin	lin	gin (Note: See the neologism ㄍㄧㄣ.)			jin	qin	xin								in (ien)	Group i Finals
Group i Finals	iang	yang	biang (Note: See 𰻞, biangbiang noodles and ㄅㄧㄤˋ.)				diang (Note: See 噹.)		niang	liang		kiang (Note: See the neologism ㄎㄧㄤ.)		jiang	qiang	xiang								iang	Group i Finals
Group i Finals	ing (ieng)	ying	bing	ping	ming		ding	ting	ning	ling	ging (Note: See the neologism ㄍㄧㄥ.)			jing	qing	xing								ing (ieng)	Group i Finals
Group u Finals	u	wu	bu	pu	mu	fu	du	tu	nu	lu	gu	ku	hu				zhu	chu	shu	ru	zu	cu	su	u	Group u Finals
Group u Finals	ua	wa									gua	kua	hua				zhua	chua (Note: See 欻.)	shua	rua (Note: See 挼.)				ua	Group u Finals
Group u Finals	uo	wo	bo	po	mo	fo	duo	tuo	nuo	luo	guo	kuo	huo				zhuo	chuo	shuo	ruo	zuo	cuo	suo	uo	Group u Finals
Group u Finals	uai	wai									guai	kuai	huai				zhuai (Note: See 拽.)	chuai (Note: See 揣.)	shuai					uai	Group u Finals
Group u Finals	ui (uei)	wei					dui	tui	nui (Note: See 捼.)		gui	kui	hui				zhui	chui	shui	rui	zui	cui	sui	ui (uei)	Group u Finals
Group u Finals	uan	wan					duan	tuan	nuan	luan	guan	kuan	huan				zhuan	chuan	shuan	ruan	zuan	cuan	suan	uan	Group u Finals
Group u Finals	un (uen)	wen		pun (Note: See the neologism ㄆㄨㄣ.)			dun	tun	nun (Note: See 黁.)	lun	gun	kun	hun				zhun	chun	shun	run	zun	cun	sun	un (uen)	Group u Finals
Group u Finals	uang	wang					duang (Note: See the neologism duang.)				guang	kuang	huang				zhuang	chuang	shuang					uang	Group u Finals
Group u Finals	ong (ueng)	weng					dong	tong	nong	long	gong	kong	hong				zhong	chong		rong	zong	cong	song	ong (ueng)	Group u Finals
Group u Finals	ong (ueng)	ong (Note: See the variant pronunciation of 唵.)					dong	tong	nong	long	gong	kong	hong				zhong	chong		rong	zong	cong	song	ong (ueng)	Group u Finals
Group ü Finals	ü	yu							nü	lü				ju	qu	xu								ü	Group ü Finals
Group ü Finals	üe (üê)	yue							nüe	lüe				jue	que	xue								üe (üê)	Group ü Finals
Group ü Finals	üan	yuan								lüan (Note: See the Taiwan variant pronunciations of e.g. 孌, 攣, 孿, 臠, 癵.)				juan	quan	xuan								üan	Group ü Finals
Group ü Finals	ün (üen)	yun								lün (Note: See the Beijing variant pronunciation of 淋.)				jun	qun	xun								ün (üen)	Group ü Finals
Group ü Finals	iong (üeng)	yong												jiong (Note: See 窘, 囧.)	qiong	xiong								iong (üeng)	Group ü Finals
Pinyin table		∅	b	p	m	f	d	t	n	l	g	k	h	j	q	x	zh	ch	sh	r	z	c	s	Pinyin table	
Pinyin table		Initials																						Pinyin table	

Color Legend:

"regular" initial or final Final is in Group a or is a direct combination of: i+Group a final; u+Group a final; ü+Group a final	Final of i, u, ü group is a modified combination of: i+Group a final; u+Group a final; ü+Group a final	syllable is direct combination of initial and final (or follows rules for no-initial syllables outlined at the top of the page)	syllable is modified combination of initial and final

There are also a very small number of syllables consisting only of consonants: m (呣), n (嗯), ng (嗯), hm (噷), hng (哼).

== Erhua contraction ==
Additional syllables in pinyin exist to represent the erhua phenomenon by combining the affected syllable with an -r ending, rather than transcribing 兒/儿 as a separate ér syllable. This can be seen as analogous to certain contractions in English such as "they're" in place of "they are".

Original characters	那裡、那里	人緣、人缘	兒媳婦、儿媳妇
Original pinyin	nàli	rényuán	érxífu
Erhua characters	那兒、那儿	人緣兒、人缘儿	兒媳婦兒、儿媳妇儿
Erhua pinyin	nàr	rényuánr	érxífur

== See also ==
- Wade–Giles table
- Palladius table
- Zhuyin table
- Cyrillization of Chinese
- Comparison of Chinese transcription systems
