= Comparison of Standard Chinese transcription systems =

This comparison of Standard Chinese transcription systems comprises a list of all syllables which are considered phonemically distinguishable within Standard Chinese.

Gwoyeu Romatzyh employs a different spelling for each tone, whereas other systems employ tone marks or superscript numerals.

== Comparison table ==
Hanyu Pinyin	Bopomofo	Tong- yong	Wade– Giles	MPS II	Yale	EFEO	Lessing –Othmer	Gwoyeu Romatzyh				IPA	Note
Hanyu Pinyin	Bopomofo	Tong- yong	Wade– Giles	MPS II	Yale	EFEO	Lessing –Othmer	Tone 1	Tone 2	Tone 3	Tone 4	IPA	Note
a	ㄚ	a	a	a	a	a	a	a	ar	aa	ah	a	
ai	ㄞ	ai	ai	ai	ai	ngai	ai	ai	air	ae	ay	ai	
an	ㄢ	an	an	an	an	ngan	an	an	arn	aan	ann	an	
ang	ㄤ	ang	ang	ang	ang	ngang	ang	ang	arng	aang	anq	aŋ	
ao	ㄠ	ao	ao	au	au	ngao	au	au	aur	ao	aw	au	
ba	ㄅㄚ	ba	pa	ba	ba	pa	ba	ba	bar	baa	bah	pa	
bai	ㄅㄞ	bai	pai	bai	bai	pai	bai	bai	bair	bae	bay	pai	
ban	ㄅㄢ	ban	pan	ban	ban	pan	ban	ban	barn	baan	bann	pan	
bang	ㄅㄤ	bang	pang	bang	bang	pang	bang	bang	barng	baang	banq	paŋ	
bao	ㄅㄠ	bao	pao	bau	bau	pao	bau	bau	baur	bao	baw	pau	
bei	ㄅㄟ	bei	pei	bei	bei	pei	be	bei	beir	beei	bey	pei	
ben	ㄅㄣ	ben	pên	ben	ben	pen	bën	ben	bern	been	benn	pən	
beng	ㄅㄥ	beng	pêng	beng	beng	peng	bëng	beng	berng	beeng	benq	pəŋ	
bi	ㄅㄧ	bi	pi	bi	bi	pi	bi	bi	byi	bii	bih	pi	
bian	ㄅㄧㄢ	bian	pien	bian	byan	pien	biän	bian	byan	bean	biann	piɛn	
biao	ㄅㄧㄠ	biao	piao	biau	byau	piao	biau	biau	byau	beau	biaw	piau	
bie	ㄅㄧㄝ	bie	pieh	bie	bye	pie	biä	bie	bye	biee	bieh	pie	
bin	ㄅㄧㄣ	bin	pin	bin	bin	pin	bin	bin	byn	biin	binn	pin	
bing	ㄅㄧㄥ	bing	ping	bing	bing	ping	bing	bing	byng	biing	binq	piŋ	
bo	ㄅㄛ	bo	po	bo	bwo	po	bo	bo	bor	boo	boh	puo	
bu	ㄅㄨ	bu	pu	bu	bu	pou	bu	bu	bwu	buu	buh	pu	
ca	ㄘㄚ	ca	tsʻa	tsa	tsa	ts'a	tsa	tsa	tsar	tsaa	tsah	tsʰa	
cai	ㄘㄞ	cai	tsʻai	tsai	tsai	ts'ai	tsai	tsai	tsair	tsae	tsay	tsʰai	
can	ㄘㄢ	can	tsʻan	tsan	tsan	ts'an	tsan	tsan	tsarn	tsaan	tsann	tsʰan	
cang	ㄘㄤ	cang	tsʻang	tsang	tsang	ts'ang	tsang	tsang	tsarng	tsaang	tsanq	tsʰaŋ	
cao	ㄘㄠ	cao	tsʻao	tsau	tsau	ts'ao	tsau	tsau	tsaur	tsao	tsaw	tsʰau	
ce	ㄘㄜ	ce	tsʻê	tse	tse	ts'ö	tsö	tse	tser	tsee	tseh	tsʰɤ	
cen	ㄘㄣ	cen	tsʻên	tsen	tsen	ts'en	tsën	tsen	tsern	tseen	tsenn	tsʰən	
ceng	ㄘㄥ	ceng	tsʻêng	tseng	tseng	ts'eng	tsëng	tseng	tserng	tseeng	tsenq	tsʰəŋ	
cha	ㄔㄚ	cha	chʻa	cha	cha	tch'a	tscha	cha	char	chaa	chah	ʈʂʰa	
chai	ㄔㄞ	chai	chʻai	chai	chai	tch'ai	tschai	chai	chair	chae	chay	ʈʂʰai	
chan	ㄔㄢ	chan	chʻan	chan	chan	tch'an	tschan	chan	charn	chaan	chann	ʈʂʰan	
chang	ㄔㄤ	chang	chʻang	chang	chang	tch'ang	tschang	chang	charng	chaang	chanq	ʈʂʰaŋ	
chao	ㄔㄠ	chao	chʻao	chau	chau	tch'ao	tschau	chau	chaur	chao	chaw	ʈʂʰau	
che	ㄔㄜ	che	chʻê	che	che	tch'ö	tschö	che	cher	chee	cheh	ʈʂʰɤ	
chen	ㄔㄣ	chen	chʻên	chen	chen	tch'en	tschën	chen	chern	cheen	chenn	ʈʂʰən	
cheng	ㄔㄥ	cheng	chʻêng	cheng	cheng	tch'eng	tschëng	cheng	cherng	cheeng	chenq	ʈʂʰəŋ	
chi	ㄔ	chih	chʻih	chr	chr	tch'e	tschï	chy	chyr	chyy	chyh	ʈʂʰɨ	
chong	ㄔㄨㄥ	chong	chʻung	chung	chung	tch'ong	tschung	chong	chorng	choong	chonq	ʈʂʰʊŋ	
chou	ㄔㄡ	chou	chʻou	chou	chou	tch'eou	tschou	chou	chour	choou	chow	ʈʂʰou	
chu	ㄔㄨ	chu	chʻu	chu	chu	tch'ou	tschu	chu	chwu	chuu	chuh	ʈʂʰu	
chua	ㄔㄨㄚ	chua	chʻua	chua	chwa	tch'oua	tschua	chua	chwa	choa	chuah	ʈʂʰua	
chuai	ㄔㄨㄞ	chuai	chʻuai	chuai	chwai	tch'ouai	tschuai	chuai	chwai	choai	chuay	ʈʂʰuai	
chuan	ㄔㄨㄢ	chuan	chʻuan	chuan	chwan	tch'ouan	tschuan	chuan	chwan	choan	chuann	ʈʂʰuan	
chuang	ㄔㄨㄤ	chuang	chʻuang	chuang	chwang	tch'ouang	tschuang	chuang	chwang	choang	chuanq	ʈʂʰuaŋ	
chui	ㄔㄨㄟ	chuei	chʻui	chuei	chwei	tch'ouei	tschui	chuei	chwei	choei	chuey	ʈʂʰuei	
chun	ㄔㄨㄣ	chun	chʻun	chuen	chwun	tch'ouen	tschun	chuen	chwen	choen	chuenn	ʈʂʰuən	
chuo	ㄔㄨㄛ	chuo	chʻo/chʻuo	chuo	chwo	tch'ouo	tscho	chuo	chwo	chuoo	chuoh	ʈʂʰuo	
ci	ㄘ	cih	tzʻŭ	tsz	tsz	ts'eu	tsï	tsy	tsyr	tsyy	tsyh	tsʰɨ	
cong	ㄘㄨㄥ	cong	tsʻung	tsung	tsung	ts'ong	tsung	tsong	tsorng	tsoong	tsonq	tsʰʊŋ	
cou	ㄘㄡ	cou	tsʻou	tsou	tsou	ts'eou	tsou	tsou	tsour	tsoou	tsow	tsʰou	
cu	ㄘㄨ	cu	tsʻu	tsu	tsu	ts'ou	tsu	tsu	tswu	tsuu	tsuh	tsʰu	
cuan	ㄘㄨㄢ	cuan	tsʻuan	tsuan	tswan	ts'ouan	tsuan	tsuan	tswan	tsoan	tsuann	tsʰuan	
cui	ㄘㄨㄟ	cuei	tsʻui	tsuei	tswei	ts'ouei	tsui	tsuei	tswei	tsoei	tsuey	tsʰuei	
cun	ㄘㄨㄣ	cun	tsʻun	tsuen	tswun	ts'ouen	tsun	tsuen	tswen	tsoen	tsuenn	tsʰuən	
cuo	ㄘㄨㄛ	cuo	tsʻo	tsuo	tswo	ts'o	tso	tsuo	tswo	tsuoo	tsuoh	tsʰuo	
da	ㄉㄚ	da	ta	da	da	ta	da	da	dar	daa	dah	ta	
dai	ㄉㄞ	dai	tai	dai	dai	tai	dai	dai	dair	dae	day	tai	
dan	ㄉㄢ	dan	tan	dan	dan	tan	dan	dan	darn	daan	dann	tan	
dang	ㄉㄤ	dang	tang	dang	dang	tang	dang	dang	darng	daang	danq	taŋ	
dao	ㄉㄠ	dao	tao	dau	dau	tao	dau	dau	daur	dao	daw	tau	
de	ㄉㄜ	de	tê	de	de	tö	dö	de	der	dee	deh	tɤ	
dei	ㄉㄟ	dei	tei	dei	dei	tei	de	dei	deir	deei	dey	tei	
den	ㄉㄣ	den	tên	den	den			den	dern	deen	denn	tən	
deng	ㄉㄥ	deng	têng	deng	deng	teng	dëng	deng	derng	deeng	denq	təŋ	
di	ㄉㄧ	di	ti	di	di	ti	di	di	dyi	dii	dih	ti	
dian	ㄉㄧㄢ	dian	tien	dian	dyan	tien	diän	dian	dyan	dean	diann	tiɛn	
diang	ㄉㄧㄤ	diang	tiang	diang	dyang	tiang	diäng	diang	dyang	deang	dianq	tiaŋ	
diao	ㄉㄧㄠ	diao	tiao	diau	dyau	tiao	diau	diau	dyau	deau	diaw	tiau	
die	ㄉㄧㄝ	die	tieh	die	dye	tie	diä	die	dye	diee	dieh	tie	
ding	ㄉㄧㄥ	ding	ting	ding	ding	ting	ding	ding	dyng	diing	dinq	tiŋ	
diu	ㄉㄧㄡ	diou	tiu	diou	dyou	tieou	diu	diou	dyou	deou	diow	tiou	
dong	ㄉㄨㄥ	dong	tung	dung	dung	tong	dung	dong	dorng	doong	donq	tʊŋ	
dou	ㄉㄡ	dou	tou	dou	dou	teou	dou	dou	dour	doou	dow	tou	
du	ㄉㄨ	du	tu	du	du	tou	du	du	dwu	duu	duh	tu	
duan	ㄉㄨㄢ	duan	tuan	duan	dwan	touan	duan	duan	dwan	doan	duann	tuan	
dui	ㄉㄨㄟ	duei	tui	duei	dwei	touei	dui	duei	dwei	doei	duey	tuei	
dun	ㄉㄨㄣ	dun	tun	duen	dwun	touen	dun	duen	dwen	doen	duenn	tuən	
duo	ㄉㄨㄛ	duo	to	duo	dwo	to	do	duo	dwo	duoo	duoh	tuo	
e	ㄜ	e	ê/o	e	e	ngo	o	e	er	ee	eh	ɤ	
ê	ㄝ	ê	eh	ê	e			è	èr	èè	èh	ɛ	
ei	ㄟ	ei	ei	ei	ei	ei	e	ei	eir	eei	ey	ei	
en	ㄣ	en	ên	en	en	ngen	ën	en	ern	een	enn	ən	
eng	ㄥ	eng	êng	eng	eng	ngeng	ëng	eng	erng	eeng	enq	əŋ	
er	ㄦ	er	êrh	er	er	eul	örl	el	erl	eel	ell	aɚ	
fa	ㄈㄚ	fa	fa	fa	fa	fa	fa	fa	far	faa	fah	fa	
fan	ㄈㄢ	fan	fan	fan	fan	fan	fan	fan	farn	faan	fann	fan	
fang	ㄈㄤ	fang	fang	fang	fang	fang	fang	fang	farng	faang	fanq	faŋ	
fei	ㄈㄟ	fei	fei	fei	fei	fei	fe	fei	feir	feei	fey	fei	
fen	ㄈㄣ	fen	fên	fen	fen	fen	fën	fen	fern	feen	fenn	fən	
feng	ㄈㄥ	fong	fêng	feng	feng	feng	fëng	feng	ferng	feeng	fenq	fəŋ	
fiao	ㄈㄧㄠ	fiao	fiao	fiau	fyau	fiao	fiau	fiau	fyau	feau	fiaw	fiau	
fo	ㄈㄛ	fo	fo	fo	fwo	fo	fo	fo	for	foo	foh	fuo	
fou	ㄈㄡ	fou	fou	fou	fou	feou	fou	fou	four	foou	fow	fou	
fu	ㄈㄨ	fu	fu	fu	fu	fou	fu	fu	fwu	fuu	fuh	fu	
ga	ㄍㄚ	ga	ka	ga	ga	ka	ga	ga	gar	gaa	gah	ka	
gai	ㄍㄞ	gai	kai	gai	gai	kai	gai	gai	gair	gae	gay	kai	
gan	ㄍㄢ	gan	kan	gan	gan	kan	gan	gan	garn	gaan	gann	kan	
gang	ㄍㄤ	gang	kang	gang	gang	kang	gang	gang	garng	gaang	ganq	kaŋ	
gao	ㄍㄠ	gao	kao	gau	gau	kao	gau	gau	gaur	gao	gaw	kau	
ge	ㄍㄜ	ge	ko	ge	ge	kö	gö	ge	ger	gee	geh	kɤ	
gei	ㄍㄟ	gei	kei	gei	gei	kei	ge	gei	geir	geei	gey	kei	
gen	ㄍㄣ	gen	kên	gen	gen	ken	gën	gen	gern	geen	genn	kən	
geng	ㄍㄥ	geng	kêng	geng	geng	keng	gëng	geng	gerng	geeng	genq	kəŋ	
gong	ㄍㄨㄥ	gong	kung	gung	gung	kong	gung	gong	gorng	goong	gonq	kʊŋ	
gou	ㄍㄡ	gou	kou	gou	gou	keou	gou	gou	gour	goou	gow	kou	
gu	ㄍㄨ	gu	ku	gu	gu	kou	gu	gu	gwu	guu	guh	ku	
gua	ㄍㄨㄚ	gua	kua	gua	gwa	koua	gua	gua	gwa	goa	guah	kua	
guai	ㄍㄨㄞ	guai	kuai	guai	gwai	kouai	guai	guai	gwai	goai	guay	kuai	
guan	ㄍㄨㄢ	guan	kuan	guan	gwan	kouan	guan	guan	gwan	goan	guann	kuan	
guang	ㄍㄨㄤ	guang	kuang	guang	gwang	kouang	guang	guang	gwang	goang	guanq	kuaŋ	
gui	ㄍㄨㄟ	guei	kuei	guei	gwei	kouei	gui	guei	gwei	goei	guey	kuei	
gun	ㄍㄨㄣ	gun	kun	guen	gwun	kouen	gun	guen	gwen	goen	guenn	kuən	
guo	ㄍㄨㄛ	guo	kuo	guo	gwo	kouo	guo	guo	gwo	guoo	guoh	kuo	
ha	ㄏㄚ	ha	ha	ha	ha	ha	ha	ha	har	haa	hah	xa	
hai	ㄏㄞ	hai	hai	hai	hai	hai	hai	hai	hair	hae	hay	xai	
han	ㄏㄢ	han	han	han	han	han	han	han	harn	haan	hann	xan	
hang	ㄏㄤ	hang	hang	hang	hang	hang	hang	hang	harng	haang	hanq	xaŋ	
hao	ㄏㄠ	hao	hao	hau	hau	hao	hau	hau	haur	hao	haw	xau	
he	ㄏㄜ	he	ho	he	he	hö	ho	he	her	hee	heh	xɤ	
hei	ㄏㄟ	hei	hei	hei	hei	hei	he	hei	heir	heei	hey	xei	
hen	ㄏㄣ	hen	hên	hen	hen	hen	hën	hen	hern	heen	henn	xən	
heng	ㄏㄥ	heng	hêng	heng	heng	heng	hëng	heng	herng	heeng	henq	xəŋ	
hong	ㄏㄨㄥ	hong	hung	hung	hung	hong	hung	hong	horng	hoong	honq	xʊŋ	
hou	ㄏㄡ	hou	hou	hou	hou	heou	hou	hou	hour	hoou	how	xou	
hu	ㄏㄨ	hu	hu	hu	hu	hou	hu	hu	hwu	huu	huh	xu	
hua	ㄏㄨㄚ	hua	hua	hua	hwa	houa	hua	hua	hwa	hoa	huah	xua	
huai	ㄏㄨㄞ	huai	huai	huai	hwai	houai	huai	huai	hwai	hoai	huay	xuai	
huan	ㄏㄨㄢ	huan	huan	huan	hwan	houan	huan	huan	hwan	hoan	huann	xuan	
huang	ㄏㄨㄤ	huang	huang	huang	hwang	houang	huang	huang	hwang	hoang	huanq	xuaŋ	
hui	ㄏㄨㄟ	huei	hui	huei	hwei	houei	hui	huei	hwei	hoei	huey	xuei	
hun	ㄏㄨㄣ	hun	hun	huen	hwun	houen	hun	huen	hwen	hoen	huenn	xuən	
huo	ㄏㄨㄛ	huo	huo	huo	hwo	houo	huo	huo	hwo	huoo	huoh	xuo	
ji	ㄐㄧ	ji	chi	ji	ji	ki	dji	ji	jyi	jii	jih	tɕi	
jia	ㄐㄧㄚ	jia	chia	jia	jya	kia	djia	jia	jya	jea	jiah	tɕia	
jian	ㄐㄧㄢ	jian	chien	jian	jyan	kien	djiän	jian	jyan	jean	jiann	tɕiɛn	
jiang	ㄐㄧㄤ	jiang	chiang	jiang	jyang	kiang	djiang	jiang	jyang	jeang	jianq	tɕiaŋ	
jiao	ㄐㄧㄠ	jiao	chiao	jiau	jyau	kiao	djiau	jiau	jyau	jeau	jiaw	tɕiau	
jie	ㄐㄧㄝ	jie	chieh	jie	jye	kie	djiä	jie	jye	jiee	jieh	tɕie	
jin	ㄐㄧㄣ	jin	chin	jin	jin	kin	djin	jin	jyn	jiin	jinn	tɕin	
jing	ㄐㄧㄥ	jing	ching	jing	jing	king	djing	jing	jyng	jiing	jinq	tɕiŋ	
jiong	ㄐㄩㄥ	jyong	chiung	jiung	jyung	kiong	djiung	jiong	jyong	jeong	jionq	tɕiʊŋ	
jiu	ㄐㄧㄡ	jiou	chiu	jiou	jyou	kieou	djiu	jiou	jyou	jeou	jiow	tɕiou	
ju	ㄐㄩ	jyu	chü	jiu	jyu	kiu	djü	jiu	jyu	jeu	jiuh	tɕy	
juan	ㄐㄩㄢ	jyuan	chüan	jiuan	jywan	kiuan	djüan	jiuan	jyuan	jeuan	jiuann	tɕyɛn	
jue	ㄐㄩㄝ	jyue	chüeh	jiue	jywe	kiue	djüä	jiue	jyue	jeue	jiueh	tɕye	
jun	ㄐㄩㄣ	jyun	chün	jiun	jyun	kiun	djün	jiun	jyun	jeun	jiunn	tɕyn	
ka	ㄎㄚ	ka	kʻa	ka	ka	k'a	ka	ka	kar	kaa	kah	kʰa	
kai	ㄎㄞ	kai	kʻai	kai	kai	k'ai	kai	kai	kair	kae	kay	kʰai	
kan	ㄎㄢ	kan	kʻan	kan	kan	k'an	kan	kan	karn	kaan	kann	kʰan	
kang	ㄎㄤ	kang	kʻang	kang	kang	k'ang	kang	kang	karng	kaang	kanq	kʰaŋ	
kao	ㄎㄠ	kao	kʻao	kau	kau	k'ao	kau	kau	kaur	kao	kaw	kʰau	
ke	ㄎㄜ	ke	kʻo	ke	ke	k'ö	kö	ke	ker	kee	keh	kʰɤ	
kei	ㄎㄟ	kei	kʻei	kei	kei			kei	keir	keei	key	kʰei	
ken	ㄎㄣ	ken	kʻên	ken	ken	k'en	kën	ken	kern	keen	kenn	kʰən	
keng	ㄎㄥ	keng	kʻêng	keng	keng	k'eng	këng	keng	kerng	keeng	kenq	kʰəŋ	
kong	ㄎㄨㄥ	kong	kʻung	kung	kung	k'ong	kung	kong	korng	koong	konq	kʰʊŋ	
kou	ㄎㄡ	kou	kʻou	kou	kou	k'eou	kou	kou	kour	koou	kow	kʰou	
ku	ㄎㄨ	ku	kʻu	ku	ku	k'ou	gu	ku	kwu	kuu	kuh	kʰu	
kua	ㄎㄨㄚ	kua	kʻua	kua	kwa	k'oua	kua	kua	kwa	koa	kuah	kʰua	
kuai	ㄎㄨㄞ	kuai	kʻuai	kuai	kwai	k'ouai	kuai	kuai	kwai	koai	kuay	kʰuai	
kuan	ㄎㄨㄢ	kuan	kʻuan	kuan	kwan	k'ouan	kuan	kuan	kwan	koan	kuann	kʰuan	
kuang	ㄎㄨㄤ	kuang	kʻuang	kuang	kwang	k'ouang	kuang	kuang	kwang	koang	kuanq	kʰuaŋ	
kui	ㄎㄨㄟ	kuei	kʻuei	kuei	kwei	k'ouei	kue	kuei	kwei	koei	kuey	kʰuei	
kun	ㄎㄨㄣ	kun	kʻun	kuen	kwun	k'ouen	kun	kuen	kwen	koen	kuenn	kʰuən	
kuo	ㄎㄨㄛ	kuo	kʻuo	kuo	kwo	k'ouo	kuo	kuo	kwo	kuoo	kuoh	kʰuo	
la	ㄌㄚ	la	la	la	la	la	la	lha	la	laa	lah	la	
lai	ㄌㄞ	lai	lai	lai	lai	lai	lai	lhai	lai	lae	lay	lai	
lan	ㄌㄢ	lan	lan	lan	lan	lan	lan	lhan	lan	laan	lann	lan	
lang	ㄌㄤ	lang	lang	lang	lang	lang	lang	lhang	lang	laang	lanq	laŋ	
lao	ㄌㄠ	lao	lao	lau	lau	lao	lau	lhau	lau	lao	law	lau	
le	ㄌㄜ	le	lê	le	le	lö	lö	lhe	le	lee	leh	lɤ	
lei	ㄌㄟ	lei	lei	lei	lei	lei	le	lhei	lei	leei	ley	lei	
leng	ㄌㄥ	leng	lêng	leng	leng	leng	lëng	lheng	leng	leeng	lenq	ləŋ	
li	ㄌㄧ	li	li	li	li	li	li	lhi	li	lii	lih	li	
lia	ㄌㄧㄚ	lia	lia	lia	lya	lea	lia	lhia	lia	lea	liah	lia	
lian	ㄌㄧㄢ	lian	lien	lian	lyan	lien	liän	lhian	lian	lean	liann	liɛn	
liang	ㄌㄧㄤ	liang	liang	liang	lyang	leang	liang	lhiang	liang	leang	lianq	liaŋ	
liao	ㄌㄧㄠ	liao	liao	liau	lyau	liao	liau	lhiau	liau	leau	liaw	liau	
lie	ㄌㄧㄝ	lie	lieh	lie	lye	lie	liä	lhie	lie	liee	lieh	lie	
lin	ㄌㄧㄣ	lin	lin	lin	lin	lin	lin	lhin	lin	liin	linn	lin	
ling	ㄌㄧㄥ	ling	ling	ling	ling	ling	ling	lhing	ling	liing	linq	liŋ	
liu	ㄌㄧㄡ	liou	liu	liou	lyou	lieou	liou	lhiou	liou	leou	liow	liou	
lo	ㄌㄛ	lo	lo	lo	lo	lo	lo	lho	lo	loo	loh	lɔ	
long	ㄌㄨㄥ	long	lung	lung	lung	long	lung	lhong	long	loong	lonq	lʊŋ	
lou	ㄌㄡ	lou	lou	lou	lou	leou	lou	lhou	lou	loou	low	lou	
lu	ㄌㄨ	lu	lu	lu	lu	lou	lu	lhu	lu	luu	luh	lu	
lü	ㄌㄩ	lyu	lü	liu	lyu	liu	lü	lhiu	liu	leu	liuh	ly	
luan	ㄌㄨㄢ	luan	luan	luan	lwan	louan	luan	lhuan	luan	loan	luann	luan	
lüan	ㄌㄩㄢ	lyuan	lüan	liuan	lywan	liuan	lüän	lhiuan	liuan	leuan	liuann	lyɛn	
lüe	ㄌㄩㄝ	lyue	lüeh	liue	lywe	liue	lüä	lhiue	liue	leue	liueh	lye	
lun	ㄌㄨㄣ	lun	lun	luen	lwun	loun	lun	lhuen	luen	loen	luenn	luən	
lün	ㄌㄩㄣ	lyun	lün	liun	lyun	liun	lün	lhiun	liun	leun	liunn	lyn	
luo	ㄌㄨㄛ	luo	lo	luo	lwo	louo	lo	lhuo	luo	luoo	luoh	luo	
ma	ㄇㄚ	ma	ma	ma	ma	ma	ma	mha	ma	maa	mah	ma	
mai	ㄇㄞ	mai	mai	mai	mai	mai	mai	mhai	mai	mae	may	mai	
man	ㄇㄢ	man	man	man	man	man	man	mhan	man	maan	mann	man	
mang	ㄇㄤ	mang	mang	mang	mang	mang	mang	mhang	mang	maang	manq	maŋ	
mao	ㄇㄠ	mao	mao	mau	mau	mao	mau	mhau	mau	mao	maw	mau	
me	ㄇㄜ	me	mê	me	me	mö	mö	mhe	me	mee	meh	mɤ	
mei	ㄇㄟ	mei	mei	mei	mei	mei	me	mhei	mei	meei	mey	mei	
men	ㄇㄣ	men	mên	men	men	men	mën	mhen	men	meen	menn	mən	
meng	ㄇㄥ	meng	mêng	meng	meng	meng	mëng	mheng	meng	meeng	menq	məŋ	
mi	ㄇㄧ	mi	mi	mi	mi	mi	mi	mhi	mi	mii	mih	mi	
mian	ㄇㄧㄢ	mian	mien	mian	myan	mian	miän	mhian	mian	mean	miann	miɛn	
miao	ㄇㄧㄠ	miao	miao	miau	myau	miao	miau	mhiau	miau	meau	miaw	miau	
mie	ㄇㄧㄝ	mie	mieh	mie	mye	mie	miä	mhie	mie	miee	mieh	mie	
min	ㄇㄧㄣ	min	min	min	min	min	min	mhin	min	miin	minn	min	
ming	ㄇㄧㄥ	ming	ming	ming	ming	ming	ming	mhing	ming	miing	minq	miŋ	
miu	ㄇㄧㄡ	miou	miu	miou	myou	mieou	miu	mhiou	miou	meou	miow	miou	
mo	ㄇㄛ	mo	mo	mo	mwo	mo	mo	mho	mo	moo	moh	muo	
mou	ㄇㄡ	mou	mou	mou	mou	meou	mou	mhou	mou	moou	mow	mou	
mu	ㄇㄨ	mu	mu	mu	mu	mou	mu	mhu	mu	muu	muh	mu	
na	ㄋㄚ	na	na	na	na	na	na	nha	na	naa	nah	na	
nai	ㄋㄞ	nai	nai	nai	nai	nai	nai	nhai	nai	nae	nay	nai	
nan	ㄋㄢ	nan	nan	nan	nan	nan	nan	nhan	nan	naan	nann	nan	
nang	ㄋㄤ	nang	nang	nang	nang	nang	nang	nhang	nang	naang	nanq	naŋ	
nao	ㄋㄠ	nao	nao	nau	nau	nao	nau	nhau	nau	nao	naw	nau	
ne	ㄋㄜ	ne	nê	ne	ne	nö	nö	nhe	ne	nee	neh	nɤ	
nei	ㄋㄟ	nei	nei	nei	nei	nei	ne	nhei	nei	neei	ney	nei	
nen	ㄋㄣ	nen	nên	nen	nen	nen	nën	nhen	nen	neen	nenn	nən	
neng	ㄋㄥ	neng	nêng	neng	neng	neng	nëng	nheng	neng	neeng	nenq	nəŋ	
ni	ㄋㄧ	ni	ni	ni	ni	ni	ni	nhi	ni	nii	nih	ni	
nia	ㄋㄧㄚ	nia	nia	nia	nya	nia	nia	nhia	nia	nea	niah	nia	
nian	ㄋㄧㄢ	nian	nien	nian	nyan	nien	niän	nhian	nian	nean	niann	niɛn	
niang	ㄋㄧㄤ	niang	niang	niang	nyang	niang	niang	nhiang	niang	neang	nianq	niaŋ	
niao	ㄋㄧㄠ	niao	niao	niau	nyau	niao	niau	nhiau	niau	neau	niaw	niau	
nie	ㄋㄧㄝ	nie	nieh	nie	nye	nie	niä	nhie	nie	niee	nieh	nie	
nin	ㄋㄧㄣ	nin	nin	nin	nin	nin	nin	nhin	nin	niin	ninn	nin	
ning	ㄋㄧㄥ	ning	ning	ning	ning	ning	ning	nhing	ning	niing	ninq	niŋ	
niu	ㄋㄧㄡ	niou	niu	niou	nyou	nieou	niu	nhiou	niou	neou	niow	niou	
nong	ㄋㄨㄥ	nong	nung	nung	nung	nong	nung	nhong	nong	noong	nonq	nʊŋ	
nou	ㄋㄡ	nou	nou	nou	nou	neou	nou	nhou	nou	noou	now	nou	
nu	ㄋㄨ	nu	nu	nu	nu	nou	nu	nhu	nu	nuu	nuh	nu	
nü	ㄋㄩ	nyu	nü	niu	nyu	niu	nü	nhiu	niu	neu	niuh	ny	
nuan	ㄋㄨㄢ	nuan	nuan	nuan	nwan	nouan	nuan	nhuan	nuan	noan	nuann	nuan	
nüe	ㄋㄩㄝ	nyue	nüeh	niue	nywe	nio	nüä	nhiue	niue	neue	niueh	nye	
nun	ㄋㄨㄣ	nun	nun	nuen	nwun	nouen	nun	nhuen	nuen	noen	nuenn	nuən	
nuo	ㄋㄨㄛ	nuo	no	nuo	nwo	no	no	nhuo	nuo	nuoo	nuoh	nuo	
o	ㄛ	o	o	o	o?	o	o	o	or	oo	oh	ɔ?	
ou	ㄡ	ou	ou	ou	ou	ngeou	ou	ou	our	oou	ow	ou	
pa	ㄆㄚ	pa	pʻa	pa	pa	p'a	pa	pa	par	paa	pah	pʰa	
pai	ㄆㄞ	pai	pʻai	pai	pai	p'ai	pai	pai	pair	pae	pay	pʰai	
pan	ㄆㄢ	pan	pʻan	pan	pan	p'an	pan	pan	parn	paan	pann	pʰan	
pang	ㄆㄤ	pang	pʻang	pang	pang	p'ang	pang	pang	parng	paang	panq	pʰaŋ	
pao	ㄆㄠ	pao	pʻao	pau	pau	p'ao	pau	pau	paur	pao	paw	pʰau	
pei	ㄆㄟ	pei	pʻei	pei	pei	p'ei	pe	pei	peir	peei	pey	pʰei	
pen	ㄆㄣ	pen	pʻên	pen	pen	p'en	pën	pen	pern	peen	penn	pʰən	
peng	ㄆㄥ	peng	pʻêng	peng	peng	p'eng	pëng	peng	perng	peeng	penq	pʰəŋ	
pi	ㄆㄧ	pi	pʻi	pi	pi	p'i	pi	pi	pyi	pii	pih	pʰi	
pian	ㄆㄧㄢ	pian	pʻien	pian	pyan	p'ien	piän	pian	pyan	pean	piann	pʰiɛn	
piao	ㄆㄧㄠ	piao	pʻiao	piau	pyau	p'iao	piau	piau	pyau	peau	piaw	pʰiau	
pie	ㄆㄧㄝ	pie	pʻieh	pie	pye	p'ie	piä	pie	pye	piee	pieh	pʰie	
pin	ㄆㄧㄣ	pin	pʻin	pin	pin	p'in	pin	pin	pyn	piin	pinn	pʰin	
ping	ㄆㄧㄥ	ping	pʻing	ping	ping	p'ing	ping	ping	pyng	piing	pinq	pʰiŋ	
po	ㄆㄛ	po	pʻo	po	pwo	p'o	po	po	por	poo	poh	pʰuo	
pou	ㄆㄡ	pou	pʻou	pou	pou	p'eou	pou	pou	pour	poou	pow	pʰou	
pu	ㄆㄨ	pu	pʻu	pu	pu	p'ou	pu	pu	pwu	puu	puh	pʰu	
qi	ㄑㄧ	ci	chʻi	chi	chi	k'i	tji	chi	chyi	chii	chih	tɕʰi	
qia	ㄑㄧㄚ	cia	chʻia	chia	chya	k'ia	tjia	chia	chya	chea	chiah	tɕʰia	
qian	ㄑㄧㄢ	cian	chʻien	chian	chyan	k'ien	tjiän	chian	chyan	chean	chiann	tɕʰiɛn	
qiang	ㄑㄧㄤ	ciang	chʻiang	chiang	chyang	k'iang	tjiang	chiang	chyang	cheang	chianq	tɕʰiaŋ	
qiao	ㄑㄧㄠ	ciao	chʻiao	chiau	chyau	k'iao	tjiau	chiau	chyau	cheau	chiaw	tɕʰiau	
qie	ㄑㄧㄝ	cie	chʻieh	chie	chye	k'ie	tjiä	chie	chye	chiee	chieh	tɕʰie	
qin	ㄑㄧㄣ	cin	chʻin	chin	chin	k'in	tjin	chin	chyn	chiin	chinn	tɕʰin	
qing	ㄑㄧㄥ	cing	chʻing	ching	ching	k'ing	tjing	ching	chyng	chiing	chinq	tɕʰiŋ	
qiong	ㄑㄩㄥ	cyong	chʻiung	chiung	chyung	k'iong	tjiung	chiong	chyong	cheong	chionq	tɕʰiʊŋ	
qiu	ㄑㄧㄡ	ciou	chʻiu	chiou	chyou	k'ieou	tjiu	chiou	chyou	cheou	chiow	tɕʰiou	
qu	ㄑㄩ	cyu	chʻü	chiu	chyu	k'iu	tjü	chiu	chyu	cheu	chiuh	tɕʰy	
quan	ㄑㄩㄢ	cyuan	chʻüan	chiuan	chywan	k'iuan	tjüan	chiuan	chyuan	cheuan	chiuann	tɕʰyɛn	
que	ㄑㄩㄝ	cyue	chʻüeh	chiue	chywe	k'iue	tjüä	chiue	chyue	cheue	chiueh	tɕʰye	
qun	ㄑㄩㄣ	cyun	chʻün	chiun	chyun	k'iun	tjün	chiun	chyun	cheun	chiunn	tɕʰyn	
ran	ㄖㄢ	ran	jan	ran	ran	jan	jan	rhan	ran	raan	rann	ʐan	
rang	ㄖㄤ	rang	jang	rang	rang	jang	jang	rhang	rang	raang	ranq	ʐaŋ	
rao	ㄖㄠ	rao	jao	rau	rau	jao	jau	rhau	rau	rao	raw	ʐau	
re	ㄖㄜ	re	jê	re	re	jö	jö	rhe	re	ree	reh	ʐɤ	
ren	ㄖㄣ	ren	jên	ren	ren	jen	jën	rhen	ren	reen	renn	ʐən	
reng	ㄖㄥ	reng	jêng	reng	reng	jeng	jëng	rheng	reng	reeng	renq	ʐəŋ	
ri	ㄖ	rih	jih	r	r	je	jï	rhy	ry	ryy	ryh	ʐɨ	(Note: [ʐ] is sometimes also transcribed as [ɻ])
rong	ㄖㄨㄥ	rong	jung	rung	rung	jong	jung	rhong	rong	roong	ronq	ʐʊŋ	
rou	ㄖㄡ	rou	jou	rou	rou	jeou	jou	rhou	rou	roou	row	ʐou	
ru	ㄖㄨ	ru	ju	ru	ru	jou	ju	rhu	ru	ruu	ruh	ʐu	
ruan	ㄖㄨㄢ	ruan	juan	ruan	rwan	jouan	juan	rhuan	ruan	roan	ruann	ʐuan	
rui	ㄖㄨㄟ	ruei	jui	ruei	rwei	jouei	jui	rhuei	ruei	roei	ruey	ʐuei	
run	ㄖㄨㄣ	run	jun	ruen	rwun	jouen	jun	rhuen	ruen	roen	ruenn	ʐuən	
ruo	ㄖㄨㄛ	ruo	jo	ruo	rwo	jo	jo	rhuo	ruo	ruoo	ruoh	ʐuo	
sa	ㄙㄚ	sa	sa	sa	sa	sa	sa	sa	sar	saa	sah	sa	
sai	ㄙㄞ	sai	sai	sai	sai	sai	sai	sai	sair	sae	say	sai	
san	ㄙㄢ	san	san	san	san	san	san	san	sarn	saan	sann	san	
sang	ㄙㄤ	sang	sang	sang	sang	sang	sang	sang	sarng	saang	sanq	saŋ	
sao	ㄙㄠ	sao	sao	sau	sau	sao	sau	sau	saur	sao	saw	sau	
se	ㄙㄜ	se	sê	se	se	sö	sö	se	ser	see	seh	sɤ	
sei	ㄙㄟ	sei	sei	sei	sei			sei	seir	seei	sey	sei	
sen	ㄙㄣ	sen	sên	sen	sen	sën	sën	sen	sern	seen	senn	sən	
seng	ㄙㄥ	seng	sêng	seng	seng	sëng	sëng	seng	serng	seeng	senq	səŋ	
sha	ㄕㄚ	sha	sha	sha	sha	cha	scha	sha	shar	shaa	shah	ʂa	
shai	ㄕㄞ	shai	shai	shai	shai	chai	schai	shai	shair	shae	shay	ʂai	
shan	ㄕㄢ	shan	shan	shan	shan	chan	schan	shan	sharn	shaan	shann	ʂan	
shang	ㄕㄤ	shang	shang	shang	shang	chang	schang	shang	sharng	shaang	shanq	ʂaŋ	
shao	ㄕㄠ	shao	shao	shau	shau	chao	schau	shau	shaur	shao	shaw	ʂau	
she	ㄕㄜ	she	shê	she	she	chö	schö	she	sher	shee	sheh	ʂɤ	
shei	ㄕㄟ	shei	shei	shei	shei	chei	schei	shei	sheir	sheei	shey	ʂei	
shen	ㄕㄣ	shen	shên	shen	shen	chen	schën	shen	shern	sheen	shenn	ʂən	
sheng	ㄕㄥ	sheng	shêng	sheng	sheng	cheng	schëng	sheng	sherng	sheeng	shenq	ʂəŋ	
shi	ㄕ	shih	shih	shr	shr	che	schï	shy	shyr	shyy	shyh	ʂɨ	
shong	ㄕㄨㄥ	shong	shung	shung	shung			shong	shorng	shoong	shonq	ʂʊŋ	
shou	ㄕㄡ	shou	shou	shou	shou	cheou	schou	shou	shour	shoou	show	ʂou	
shu	ㄕㄨ	shu	shu	shu	shu	chou	schu	shu	shwu	shuu	shuh	ʂu	
shua	ㄕㄨㄚ	shua	shua	shua	shwa	choua	schua	shua	shwa	shoa	shuah	ʂua	
shuai	ㄕㄨㄞ	shuai	shuai	shuai	shwai	chouai	schuai	shuai	shwai	shoai	shuay	ʂuai	
shuan	ㄕㄨㄢ	shuan	shuan	shuan	shwan	chouan	schuan	shuan	shwan	shoan	shuann	ʂuan	
shuang	ㄕㄨㄤ	shuang	shuang	shuang	shwang	chouang	schuang	shuang	shwang	shoang	shuanq	ʂuaŋ	
shui	ㄕㄨㄟ	shuei	shui	shuei	shwei	chouei	schui	shuei	shwei	shoei	shuey	ʂuei	
shun	ㄕㄨㄣ	shun	shun	shuen	shwun	chouen	schun	shuen	shwen	shoen	shuenn	ʂuən	
shuo	ㄕㄨㄛ	shuo	shuo	shuo	shwo	chouo	scho	shuo	shwo	shuoo	shuoh	ʂuo	
si	ㄙ	sih	ssŭ	sz	sz	sseu	sï	sy	syr	syy	syh	sɨ	
song	ㄙㄨㄥ	song	sung	sung	sung	song	sung	song	sorng	soong	sonq	sʊŋ	
sou	ㄙㄡ	sou	sou	sou	sou	seou	sou	sou	sour	soou	sow	sou	
su	ㄙㄨ	su	su	su	su	sou	su	su	swu	suu	suh	su	
suan	ㄙㄨㄢ	suan	suan	suan	swan	souan	suan	suan	swan	soan	suann	suan	
sui	ㄙㄨㄟ	suei	sui	suei	swei	souei	sui	suei	swei	soei	suey	suei	
sun	ㄙㄨㄣ	sun	sun	suen	swun	souen	sun	suen	swen	soen	suenn	suən	
suo	ㄙㄨㄛ	suo	so	suo	swo	so	so	suo	swo	suoo	suoh	suo	
ta	ㄊㄚ	ta	tʻa	ta	ta	t'a	ta	ta	tar	taa	tah	tʰa	
tai	ㄊㄞ	tai	tʻai	tai	tai	t'ai	tai	tai	tair	tae	tay	tʰai	
tan	ㄊㄢ	tan	tʻan	tan	tan	t'an	tan	tan	tarn	taan	tann	tʰan	
tang	ㄊㄤ	tang	tʻang	tang	tang	t'ang	tang	tang	tarng	taang	tanq	tʰaŋ	
tao	ㄊㄠ	tao	tʻao	tau	tau	t'ao	tau	tau	taur	tao	taw	tʰau	
te	ㄊㄜ	te	tʻê	te	te	t'ö	tö	te	ter	tee	teh	tʰɤ	
tei	ㄊㄟ	tei	tʻei	tei	tei	t'ei	te	tei	teir	teei	tey	tʰei	
teng	ㄊㄥ	teng	tʻêng	teng	teng	t'eng	tëng	teng	terng	teeng	tenq	tʰəŋ	
ti	ㄊㄧ	ti	tʻi	ti	ti	t'i	ti	ti	tyi	tii	tih	tʰi	
tian	ㄊㄧㄢ	tian	tʻien	tian	tyan	t'ien	tiän	tian	tyan	tean	tiann	tʰiɛn	
tiao	ㄊㄧㄠ	tiao	tʻiao	tiau	tyau	t'iao	tiau	tiau	tyau	teau	tiaw	tʰiau	
tie	ㄊㄧㄝ	tie	tʻieh	tie	tye	t'ie	tiä	tie	tye	tiee	tieh	tʰie	
ting	ㄊㄧㄥ	ting	tʻing	ting	ting	t'ing	ting	ting	tyng	tiing	tinq	tʰiŋ	
tong	ㄊㄨㄥ	tong	tʻung	tung	tung	t'ong	tung	tong	torng	toong	tonq	tʰʊŋ	
tou	ㄊㄡ	tou	tʻou	tou	tou	t'eou	tou	tou	tour	toou	tow	tʰou	
tu	ㄊㄨ	tu	tʻu	tu	tu	t'ou	tu	tu	twu	tuu	tuh	tʰu	
tuan	ㄊㄨㄢ	tuan	tʻuan	tuan	twan	t'ouan	tuan	tuan	twan	toan	tuann	tʰuan	
tui	ㄊㄨㄟ	tuei	tʻui	tuei	twei	t'ouei	tui	tuei	twei	toei	tuey	tʰuei	
tun	ㄊㄨㄣ	tun	tʻun	tuen	twun	t'ouen	tun	tuen	twen	toen	tuenn	tʰuən	
tuo	ㄊㄨㄛ	tuo	tʻo	tuo	two	t'o	to	tuo	two	tuoo	tuoh	tʰuo	
wa	ㄨㄚ	wa	wa	wa	wa	wa	wa	ua	wa	woa	wah	ua	
wai	ㄨㄞ	wai	wai	wai	wai	wai	wai	uai	wai	woai	way	uai	
wan	ㄨㄢ	wan	wan	wan	wan	wan	wan	uan	wan	woan	wann	uan	
wang	ㄨㄤ	wang	wang	wang	wang	wang	wang	uang	wang	woang	wanq	uaŋ	
wei	ㄨㄟ	wei	wei	wei	wei	wei	we	uei	wei	woei	wey	uei	
wen	ㄨㄣ	wun	wên	wen	wen	wen	wën	uen	wen	woen	wenn	uən	
weng	ㄨㄥ	wong	wêng	weng	weng	weng	wëng	ueng	weng	woeng	wenq	uəŋ	
wo	ㄨㄛ	wo	wo	wo	wo	wo	wo	uo	wo	woo	woh	uo	
wu	ㄨ	wu	wu	wu	wu	wou	wu	u	wu	wuu	wuh	u	
xi	ㄒㄧ	si	hsi	shi	syi	hi	hsi	shi	shyi	shii	shih	ɕi	
xia	ㄒㄧㄚ	sia	hsia	shia	sya	hia	hsia	shia	shya	shea	shiah	ɕia	
xian	ㄒㄧㄢ	sian	hsien	shian	syan	hie	hsiän	shian	shyan	shean	shiann	ɕiɛn	
xiang	ㄒㄧㄤ	siang	hsiang	shiang	syang	hiang	hsiang	shiang	shyang	sheang	shianq	ɕiaŋ	
xiao	ㄒㄧㄠ	siao	hsiao	shiau	syau	hiao	hsiao	shiau	shyau	sheau	shiaw	ɕiau	
xie	ㄒㄧㄝ	sie	hsieh	shie	sye	hien	hsiä	shie	shye	shiee	shieh	ɕie	
xin	ㄒㄧㄣ	sin	hsin	shin	syin	hin	hsin	shin	shyn	shiin	shinn	ɕin	
xing	ㄒㄧㄥ	sing	hsing	shing	sying	hing	hsing	shing	shyng	shiing	shinq	ɕiŋ	
xiong	ㄒㄩㄥ	syong	hsiung	shiung	syung	hiong	hsiung	shiong	shyong	sheong	shionq	ɕiʊŋ	
xiu	ㄒㄧㄡ	siou	hsiu	shiou	syou	hieou	hsiu	shiou	shyou	sheou	shiow	ɕiou	
xu	ㄒㄩ	syu	hsü	shiu	syu	hiu	hsü	shiu	shyu	sheu	shiuh	ɕy	
xuan	ㄒㄩㄢ	syuan	hsüan	shiuan	sywan	hiuan	hsüan	shiuan	shyuan	sheuan	shiuann	ɕyɛn	
xue	ㄒㄩㄝ	syue	hsüeh	shiue	sywe	hiue	hsüä	shiue	shyue	sheue	shiueh	ɕye	
xun	ㄒㄩㄣ	syun	hsün	shiun	syun	hiun	hsün	shiun	shyun	sheun	shiunn	ɕyn	
ya	ㄧㄚ	ya	ya	ya	ya	ya	ya	ia	ya	yea	yah	ia	
yan	ㄧㄢ	yan	yen	yan	yan	yen	yän	ian	yan	yean	yann	iɛn	
yang	ㄧㄤ	yang	yang	yang	yang	yang	yang	iang	yang	yeang	yanq	iaŋ	
yao	ㄧㄠ	yao	yao	yau	yau	yao	yau	iau	yau	yeau	yaw	iau	
ye	ㄧㄝ	ye	yeh	ye	ye	ye	yä	ie	ye	yee	yeh	ie	
yi	ㄧ	yi	i/yi	yi	yi	yi	i	i	yi	yii	yih	i	
yin	ㄧㄣ	yin	yin	yin	yin	yin	yin	in	yn	yiin	yinn	in	
ying	ㄧㄥ	ying	ying	ying	ying	ying	ying	ing	yng	yiing	yinq	iŋ	
yong	ㄩㄥ	yong	yung	yung	yung	yong	yung	iong	yong	yeong	yonq	iʊŋ	
you	ㄧㄡ	you	yu	you	you	yeou	yu	iou	you	yeou	yow	iou	
yu	ㄩ	yu	yü	yu	yu	yu	yü	iu	yu	yeu	yuh	y	
yuan	ㄩㄢ	yuan	yüan	yuan	ywan	yuan	yüan	iuan	yuan	yeuan	yuann	yɛn	
yue	ㄩㄝ	yue	yüeh	yue	ywe	yue	yüä	iue	yue	yeue	yueh	ye	
yun	ㄩㄣ	yun	yün	yun	yun	yun	yün	iun	yun	yeun	yunn	yn	
za	ㄗㄚ	za	tsa	tza	dza	tsa	dsa	tza	tzar	tzaa	tzah	tsa	
zai	ㄗㄞ	zai	tsai	tzai	dzai	tsai	dsai	tzai	tzair	tzae	tzay	tsai	
zan	ㄗㄢ	zan	tsan	tzan	dzan	tsan	dsan	tzan	tzarn	tzaan	tzann	tsan	
zang	ㄗㄤ	zang	tsang	tzang	dzang	tsang	dsang	tzang	tzarng	tzaang	tzanq	tsaŋ	
zao	ㄗㄠ	zao	tsao	tzau	dzau	tsao	dsau	tzau	tzaur	tzao	tzaw	tsau	
ze	ㄗㄜ	ze	tsê	tze	dze	tsö	dsö	tze	tzer	tzee	tzeh	tsɤ	
zei	ㄗㄟ	zei	tsei	tzei	dzei	tsei	dse	tzei	tzeir	tzeei	tzey	tsei	
zen	ㄗㄣ	zen	tsên	tzen	dzen	tsen	dsën	tzen	tzern	tzeen	tzenn	tsən	
zeng	ㄗㄥ	zeng	tsêng	tzeng	dzeng	tseng	dsëng	tzeng	tzerng	tzeeng	tzenq	tsəŋ	
zha	ㄓㄚ	jha	cha	ja	ja	tcha	dscha	ja	jar	jaa	jah	ʈʂa	
zhai	ㄓㄞ	jhai	chai	jai	jai	tchai	dschai	jai	jair	jae	jay	ʈʂai	
zhan	ㄓㄢ	jhan	chan	jan	jan	tchan	dschan	jan	jarn	jaan	jann	ʈʂan	
zhang	ㄓㄤ	jhang	chang	jang	jang	tchang	dschang	jang	jarng	jaang	janq	ʈʂaŋ	
zhao	ㄓㄠ	jhao	chao	jau	jau	tchao	dschau	jau	jaur	jao	jaw	ʈʂau	
zhe	ㄓㄜ	jhe	chê	je	je	tchö	dschö	je	jer	jee	jeh	ʈʂɤ	
zhei	ㄓㄟ	jhei	chei	jei	jei	tchei	dsche	jei	jeir	jeei	jey	ʈʂei	
zhen	ㄓㄣ	jhen	chên	jen	jen	tchen	dschën	jen	jern	jeen	jenn	ʈʂən	
zheng	ㄓㄥ	jheng	chêng	jeng	jeng	tcheng	dschëng	jeng	jerng	jeeng	jenq	ʈʂəŋ	
zhi	ㄓ	jhih	chih	jr	jr	tche	dschï	jy	jyr	jyy	jyh	ʈʂɨ	
zhong	ㄓㄨㄥ	jhong	chung	jung	jung	tchong	dschung	jong	jorng	joong	jonq	ʈʂʊŋ	
zhou	ㄓㄡ	jhou	chou	jou	jou	tcheou	dschou	jou	jour	joou	jow	ʈʂou	
zhu	ㄓㄨ	jhu	chu	ju	ju	tchou	dschu	ju	jwu	juu	juh	ʈʂu	
zhua	ㄓㄨㄚ	jhua	chua	jua	jwa	tchoua	dschua	jua	jwa	joa	juah	ʈʂua	
zhuai	ㄓㄨㄞ	jhuai	chuai	juai	jwai	tchouai	dschuai	juai	jwai	joai	juay	ʈʂuai	
zhuan	ㄓㄨㄢ	jhuan	chuan	juan	jwan	tchouan	dschuan	juan	jwan	joan	juann	ʈʂuan	
zhuang	ㄓㄨㄤ	jhuang	chuang	juang	jwang	tchouang	dschuang	juang	jwang	joang	juanq	ʈʂuaŋ	
zhui	ㄓㄨㄟ	jhuei	chui	juei	jwei	tchouei	dschui	juei	jwei	joei	juey	ʈʂuei	
zhun	ㄓㄨㄣ	jhun	chun	juen	jwun	tchouen	dschun	juen	jwen	joen	juenn	ʈʂuən	
zhuo	ㄓㄨㄛ	jhuo	cho	juo	jwo	tchouo	dscho	juo	jwo	juoo	juoh	ʈʂuo	
zi	ㄗ	zih	tzŭ	tz	dz	tseu	dsï	tzy	tzyr	tzyy	tzyh	tsɨ	
zong	ㄗㄨㄥ	zong	tsung	tzung	dzung	tsong	dsung	tzong	tzorng	tzoong	tzonq	tsʊŋ	
zou	ㄗㄡ	zou	tsou	tzou	dzou	tseou	dsou	tzou	tzour	tzoou	tzow	tsou	
zu	ㄗㄨ	zu	tsu	tzu	dzu	tsou	dsu	tzu	tzwu	tzuu	tzuh	tsu	
zuan	ㄗㄨㄢ	zuan	tsuan	tzuan	dzwan	tsouan	dsuan	tzuan	tzwan	tzoan	tzuann	tsuan	
zui	ㄗㄨㄟ	zuei	tsui	tzuei	dzwei	tsouei	dsue	tzuei	tzwei	tzoei	tzuey	tsuei	
zun	ㄗㄨㄣ	zun	tsun	tzuen	dzwun	tsouen	dsun	tzuen	tzwen	tzoen	tzuenn	tsuən	
zuo	ㄗㄨㄛ	zuo	tso	tzuo	dzwo	tso	dso	tzuo	tzwo	tzuoo	tzuoh	tsuo	

== See also ==
- Romanization of Chinese
- Transcription into Chinese characters
- Pinyin table
