= Zhuyin table =

Table of all sounds in Standard Chinese

This Zhuyin table is a complete listing of all Zhuyin (Bopomofo) syllables used in the Republic of China (Taiwan) as auxiliary to Chinese language studies while in Mainland China an adaptation of the Latin alphabet is used to represent Chinese phonemes in the Pinyin system. Each syllable in a cell is composed of an initial (columns) and a final (rows). An empty cell indicates that the corresponding syllable does not exist in Standard Chinese.

Finals are grouped into subsets ㄚ, ㄧ, ㄨ and ㄩ. The ㄧ, ㄨ and ㄩ groupings indicate a combination of those finals with finals from Group ㄚ.

This table indicates possible combinations of initials and finals in Standard Chinese, but does not indicate tones, which are equally important to the proper pronunciation. Although some initial-final combinations have some syllables using each of the 5 different tones, most do not. Some utilise only one tone.

Equivalent Hanyu Pinyin initials and finals are listed next to their respective bopomofo initial and final. Bopomofo entries in this page can also be compared to syllables using the romanised Pinyin phonetic system in the Pinyin table page.

There are differences between what syllables are listed in bopomofo tables and those that are listed in some pinyin tables, due to the standardisation differences of a few characters between the mainland standard Putonghua and the Taiwanese standard Guoyu. For example, the variant sounds 挼 (ruá; ㄖㄨㄚˊ), 扽 (dèn; ㄉㄣˋ), 忒 (tēi; ㄊㄟ) are not used in the Taiwanese standard. Likewise the variant sound 孿 (lüán; ㄌㄩㄢˊ) is not recognized in Putonghua, or it is folded into (luán; ㄌㄨㄢˊ).

Note that the zhuyin ㄩ directly maps to Pinyin ü, except for the combination ㄩㄥ where it maps to Pinyin iong.

Zhuyin table		Initials																						Zhuyin table	
Zhuyin table		∅	ㄅ b	ㄆ p	ㄇ m	ㄈ f	ㄉ d	ㄊ t	ㄋ n	ㄌ l	ㄍ g	ㄎ k	ㄏ h	ㄐ j	ㄑ q	ㄒ x	ㄓ zh	ㄔ ch	ㄕ sh	ㄖ r	ㄗ z	ㄘ c	ㄙ s	Zhuyin table	
Group ㄚ a Finals	-i																ㄓ	ㄔ	ㄕ	ㄖ	ㄗ	ㄘ	ㄙ	-i	Group ㄚ a Finals
Group ㄚ a Finals	ㄚ a	ㄚ	ㄅ ㄚ	ㄆ ㄚ	ㄇ ㄚ	ㄈ ㄚ	ㄉ ㄚ	ㄊ ㄚ	ㄋ ㄚ	ㄌ ㄚ	ㄍ ㄚ	ㄎ ㄚ	ㄏ ㄚ				ㄓ ㄚ	ㄔ ㄚ	ㄕ ㄚ		ㄗ ㄚ	ㄘ ㄚ	ㄙ ㄚ	ㄚ a	Group ㄚ a Finals
Group ㄚ a Finals	ㄛ o	ㄛ	ㄅ ㄛ	ㄆ ㄛ	ㄇ ㄛ	ㄈ ㄛ				ㄌ ㄛ														ㄛ o	Group ㄚ a Finals
Group ㄚ a Finals	ㄜ e	ㄜ			ㄇ ㄜ		ㄉ ㄜ	ㄊ ㄜ	ㄋ ㄜ	ㄌ ㄜ	ㄍ ㄜ	ㄎ ㄜ	ㄏ ㄜ				ㄓ ㄜ	ㄔ ㄜ	ㄕ ㄜ	ㄖ ㄜ	ㄗ ㄜ	ㄘ ㄜ	ㄙ ㄜ	ㄜ e	Group ㄚ a Finals
Group ㄚ a Finals	ㄝ ê	ㄝ																						ㄝ ê	Group ㄚ a Finals
Group ㄚ a Finals	ㄞ ai	ㄞ	ㄅ ㄞ	ㄆ ㄞ	ㄇ ㄞ		ㄉ ㄞ	ㄊ ㄞ	ㄋ ㄞ	ㄌ ㄞ	ㄍ ㄞ	ㄎ ㄞ	ㄏ ㄞ				ㄓ ㄞ	ㄔ ㄞ	ㄕ ㄞ		ㄗ ㄞ	ㄘ ㄞ	ㄙ ㄞ	ㄞ ai	Group ㄚ a Finals
Group ㄚ a Finals	ㄟ ei	ㄟ	ㄅ ㄟ	ㄆ ㄟ	ㄇ ㄟ	ㄈ ㄟ	ㄉ ㄟ		ㄋ ㄟ	ㄌ ㄟ	ㄍ ㄟ		ㄏ ㄟ				ㄓ ㄟ		ㄕ ㄟ		ㄗ ㄟ			ㄟ ei	Group ㄚ a Finals
Group ㄚ a Finals	ㄠ ao	ㄠ	ㄅ ㄠ	ㄆ ㄠ	ㄇ ㄠ		ㄉ ㄠ	ㄊ ㄠ	ㄋ ㄠ	ㄌ ㄠ	ㄍ ㄠ	ㄎ ㄠ	ㄏ ㄠ				ㄓ ㄠ	ㄔ ㄠ	ㄕ ㄠ	ㄖ ㄠ	ㄗ ㄠ	ㄘ ㄠ	ㄙ ㄠ	ㄠ ao	Group ㄚ a Finals
Group ㄚ a Finals	ㄡ ou	ㄡ		ㄆ ㄡ	ㄇ ㄡ	ㄈ ㄡ	ㄉ ㄡ	ㄊ ㄡ	ㄋ ㄡ	ㄌ ㄡ	ㄍ ㄡ	ㄎ ㄡ	ㄏ ㄡ				ㄓ ㄡ	ㄔ ㄡ	ㄕ ㄡ	ㄖ ㄡ	ㄗ ㄡ	ㄘ ㄡ	ㄙ ㄡ	ㄡ ou	Group ㄚ a Finals
Group ㄚ a Finals	ㄢ an	ㄢ	ㄅ ㄢ	ㄆ ㄢ	ㄇ ㄢ	ㄈ ㄢ	ㄉ ㄢ	ㄊ ㄢ	ㄋ ㄢ	ㄌ ㄢ	ㄍ ㄢ	ㄎ ㄢ	ㄏ ㄢ				ㄓ ㄢ	ㄔ ㄢ	ㄕ ㄢ	ㄖ ㄢ	ㄗ ㄢ	ㄘ ㄢ	ㄙ ㄢ	ㄢ an	Group ㄚ a Finals
Group ㄚ a Finals	ㄣ en	ㄣ	ㄅ ㄣ	ㄆ ㄣ	ㄇ ㄣ	ㄈ ㄣ			ㄋ ㄣ		ㄍ ㄣ	ㄎ ㄣ	ㄏ ㄣ				ㄓ ㄣ	ㄔ ㄣ	ㄕ ㄣ	ㄖ ㄣ	ㄗ ㄣ	ㄘ ㄣ	ㄙ ㄣ	ㄣ en	Group ㄚ a Finals
Group ㄚ a Finals	ㄤ ang	ㄤ	ㄅ ㄤ	ㄆ ㄤ	ㄇ ㄤ	ㄈ ㄤ	ㄉ ㄤ	ㄊ ㄤ	ㄋ ㄤ	ㄌ ㄤ	ㄍ ㄤ	ㄎ ㄤ	ㄏ ㄤ				ㄓ ㄤ	ㄔ ㄤ	ㄕ ㄤ	ㄖ ㄤ	ㄗ ㄤ	ㄘ ㄤ	ㄙ ㄤ	ㄤ ang	Group ㄚ a Finals
Group ㄚ a Finals	ㄥ eng	ㄥ	ㄅ ㄥ	ㄆ ㄥ	ㄇ ㄥ	ㄈ ㄥ	ㄉ ㄥ	ㄊ ㄥ	ㄋ ㄥ	ㄌ ㄥ	ㄍ ㄥ	ㄎ ㄥ	ㄏ ㄥ				ㄓ ㄥ	ㄔ ㄥ	ㄕ ㄥ	ㄖ ㄥ	ㄗ ㄥ	ㄘ ㄥ	ㄙ ㄥ	ㄥ eng	Group ㄚ a Finals
Group ㄚ a Finals	ㄦ er	ㄦ																						ㄦ er	Group ㄚ a Finals
Group ㄧ i Finals	ㄧ i	ㄧ	ㄅ ㄧ	ㄆ ㄧ	ㄇ ㄧ		ㄉ ㄧ	ㄊ ㄧ	ㄋ ㄧ	ㄌ ㄧ				ㄐ ㄧ	ㄑ ㄧ	ㄒ ㄧ								ㄧ i	Group ㄧ i Finals
Group ㄧ i Finals	ㄧ ㄚ ia	ㄧ ㄚ					ㄉ ㄧ ㄚ			ㄌ ㄧ ㄚ				ㄐ ㄧ ㄚ	ㄑ ㄧ ㄚ	ㄒ ㄧ ㄚ								ㄧ ㄚ ia	Group ㄧ i Finals
Group ㄧ i Finals	ㄧ ㄛ io	ㄧ ㄛ																						ㄧ ㄛ io	Group ㄧ i Finals
Group ㄧ i Finals	ㄧ ㄝ iê	ㄧ ㄝ	ㄅ ㄧ ㄝ	ㄆ ㄧ ㄝ	ㄇ ㄧ ㄝ		ㄉ ㄧ ㄝ	ㄊ ㄧ ㄝ	ㄋ ㄧ ㄝ	ㄌ ㄧ ㄝ				ㄐ ㄧ ㄝ	ㄑ ㄧ ㄝ	ㄒ ㄧ ㄝ								ㄧ ㄝ iê	Group ㄧ i Finals
Group ㄧ i Finals	ㄧ ㄞ iai	ㄧ ㄞ																						ㄧ ㄞ iai	Group ㄧ i Finals
Group ㄧ i Finals	ㄧ ㄠ iao	ㄧ ㄠ	ㄅ ㄧ ㄠ	ㄆ ㄧ ㄠ	ㄇ ㄧ ㄠ		ㄉ ㄧ ㄠ	ㄊ ㄧ ㄠ	ㄋ ㄧ ㄠ	ㄌ ㄧ ㄠ				ㄐ ㄧ ㄠ	ㄑ ㄧ ㄠ	ㄒ ㄧ ㄠ								ㄧ ㄠ iao	Group ㄧ i Finals
Group ㄧ i Finals	ㄧ ㄡ iu	ㄧ ㄡ			ㄇ ㄧ ㄡ		ㄉ ㄧ ㄡ		ㄋ ㄧ ㄡ	ㄌ ㄧ ㄡ				ㄐ ㄧ ㄡ	ㄑ ㄧ ㄡ	ㄒ ㄧ ㄡ								ㄧ ㄡ iu	Group ㄧ i Finals
Group ㄧ i Finals	ㄧ ㄢ ian	ㄧ ㄢ	ㄅ ㄧ ㄢ	ㄆ ㄧ ㄢ	ㄇ ㄧ ㄢ		ㄉ ㄧ ㄢ	ㄊ ㄧ ㄢ	ㄋ ㄧ ㄢ	ㄌ ㄧ ㄢ				ㄐ ㄧ ㄢ	ㄑ ㄧ ㄢ	ㄒ ㄧ ㄢ								ㄧ ㄢ ian	Group ㄧ i Finals
Group ㄧ i Finals	ㄧ ㄣ in	ㄧ ㄣ	ㄅ ㄧ ㄣ	ㄆ ㄧ ㄣ	ㄇ ㄧ ㄣ				ㄋ ㄧ ㄣ	ㄌ ㄧ ㄣ				ㄐ ㄧ ㄣ	ㄑ ㄧ ㄣ	ㄒ ㄧ ㄣ								ㄧ ㄣ in	Group ㄧ i Finals
Group ㄧ i Finals	ㄧ ㄤ iang	ㄧ ㄤ							ㄋ ㄧ ㄤ	ㄌ ㄧ ㄤ				ㄐ ㄧ ㄤ	ㄑ ㄧ ㄤ	ㄒ ㄧ ㄤ								ㄧ ㄤ iang	Group ㄧ i Finals
Group ㄧ i Finals	ㄧ ㄥ ing	ㄧ ㄥ	ㄅ ㄧ ㄥ	ㄆ ㄧ ㄥ	ㄇ ㄧ ㄥ		ㄉ ㄧ ㄥ	ㄊ ㄧ ㄥ	ㄋ ㄧ ㄥ	ㄌ ㄧ ㄥ				ㄐ ㄧ ㄥ	ㄑ ㄧ ㄥ	ㄒ ㄧ ㄥ								ㄧ ㄥ ing	Group ㄧ i Finals
Group ㄨ u Finals	ㄨ u	ㄨ	ㄅ ㄨ	ㄆ ㄨ	ㄇ ㄨ	ㄈ ㄨ	ㄉ ㄨ	ㄊ ㄨ	ㄋ ㄨ	ㄌ ㄨ	ㄍ ㄨ	ㄎ ㄨ	ㄏ ㄨ				ㄓ ㄨ	ㄔ ㄨ	ㄕ ㄨ	ㄖ ㄨ	ㄗ ㄨ	ㄘ ㄨ	ㄙ ㄨ	ㄨ u	Group ㄨ u Finals
Group ㄨ u Finals	ㄨ ㄚ ua	ㄨ ㄚ									ㄍ ㄨ ㄚ	ㄎ ㄨ ㄚ	ㄏ ㄨ ㄚ				ㄓ ㄨ ㄚ	ㄔ ㄨ ㄚ	ㄕ ㄨ ㄚ					ㄨ ㄚ ua	Group ㄨ u Finals
Group ㄨ u Finals	ㄨ ㄛ uo	ㄨ ㄛ					ㄉ ㄨ ㄛ	ㄊ ㄨ ㄛ	ㄋ ㄨ ㄛ	ㄌ ㄨ ㄛ	ㄍ ㄨ ㄛ	ㄎ ㄨ ㄛ	ㄏ ㄨ ㄛ				ㄓ ㄨ ㄛ	ㄔ ㄨ ㄛ	ㄕ ㄨ ㄛ	ㄖ ㄨ ㄛ	ㄗ ㄨ ㄛ	ㄘ ㄨ ㄛ	ㄙ ㄨ ㄛ	ㄨ ㄛ uo	Group ㄨ u Finals
Group ㄨ u Finals	ㄨ ㄞ uai	ㄨ ㄞ									ㄍ ㄨ ㄞ	ㄎ ㄨ ㄞ	ㄏ ㄨ ㄞ				ㄓ ㄨ ㄞ	ㄔ ㄨ ㄞ	ㄕ ㄨ ㄞ					ㄨ ㄞ uai	Group ㄨ u Finals
Group ㄨ u Finals	ㄨ ㄟ ui	ㄨ ㄟ					ㄉ ㄨ ㄟ	ㄊ ㄨ ㄟ			ㄍ ㄨ ㄟ	ㄎ ㄨ ㄟ	ㄏ ㄨ ㄟ				ㄓ ㄨ ㄟ	ㄔ ㄨ ㄟ	ㄕ ㄨ ㄟ	ㄖ ㄨ ㄟ	ㄗ ㄨ ㄟ	ㄘ ㄨ ㄟ	ㄙ ㄨ ㄟ	ㄨ ㄟ ui	Group ㄨ u Finals
Group ㄨ u Finals	ㄨ ㄢ uan	ㄨ ㄢ					ㄉ ㄨ ㄢ	ㄊ ㄨ ㄢ	ㄋ ㄨ ㄢ	ㄌ ㄨ ㄢ	ㄍ ㄨ ㄢ	ㄎ ㄨ ㄢ	ㄏ ㄨ ㄢ				ㄓ ㄨ ㄢ	ㄔ ㄨ ㄢ	ㄕ ㄨ ㄢ	ㄖ ㄨ ㄢ	ㄗ ㄨ ㄢ	ㄘ ㄨ ㄢ	ㄙ ㄨ ㄢ	ㄨ ㄢ uan	Group ㄨ u Finals
Group ㄨ u Finals	ㄨ ㄣ uen	ㄨ ㄣ					ㄉ ㄨ ㄣ	ㄊ ㄨ ㄣ		ㄌ ㄨ ㄣ	ㄍ ㄨ ㄣ	ㄎ ㄨ ㄣ	ㄏ ㄨ ㄣ				ㄓ ㄨ ㄣ	ㄔ ㄨ ㄣ	ㄕ ㄨ ㄣ	ㄖ ㄨ ㄣ	ㄗ ㄨ ㄣ	ㄘ ㄨ ㄣ	ㄙ ㄨ ㄣ	ㄨ ㄣ uen	Group ㄨ u Finals
Group ㄨ u Finals	ㄨ ㄤ uang	ㄨ ㄤ									ㄍ ㄨ ㄤ	ㄎ ㄨ ㄤ	ㄏ ㄨ ㄤ				ㄓ ㄨ ㄤ	ㄔ ㄨ ㄤ	ㄕ ㄨ ㄤ					ㄨ ㄤ uang	Group ㄨ u Finals
Group ㄨ u Finals	ㄨ ㄥ ong	ㄨ ㄥ					ㄉ ㄨ ㄥ	ㄊ ㄨ ㄥ	ㄋ ㄨ ㄥ	ㄌ ㄨ ㄥ	ㄍ ㄨ ㄥ	ㄎ ㄨ ㄥ	ㄏ ㄨ ㄥ				ㄓ ㄨ ㄥ	ㄔ ㄨ ㄥ		ㄖ ㄨ ㄥ	ㄗ ㄨ ㄥ	ㄘ ㄨ ㄥ	ㄙ ㄨ ㄥ	ㄨ ㄥ ong	Group ㄨ u Finals
Group ㄩ ü Finals	ㄩ ü	ㄩ							ㄋ ㄩ	ㄌ ㄩ				ㄐ ㄩ	ㄑ ㄩ	ㄒ ㄩ								ㄩ ü	Group ㄩ ü Finals
Group ㄩ ü Finals	ㄩ ㄝ üê	ㄩ ㄝ							ㄋ ㄩ ㄝ	ㄌ ㄩ ㄝ				ㄐ ㄩ ㄝ	ㄑ ㄩ ㄝ	ㄒ ㄩ ㄝ								ㄩ ㄝ üê	Group ㄩ ü Finals
Group ㄩ ü Finals	ㄩ ㄢ üan	ㄩ ㄢ								ㄌ ㄩ ㄢ				ㄐ ㄩ ㄢ	ㄑ ㄩ ㄢ	ㄒ ㄩ ㄢ								ㄩ ㄢ üan	Group ㄩ ü Finals
Group ㄩ ü Finals	ㄩ ㄣ ün	ㄩ ㄣ												ㄐ ㄩ ㄣ	ㄑ ㄩ ㄣ	ㄒ ㄩ ㄣ								ㄩ ㄣ ün	Group ㄩ ü Finals
Group ㄩ ü Finals	ㄩ ㄥ iong	ㄩ ㄥ												ㄐ ㄩ ㄥ	ㄑ ㄩ ㄥ	ㄒ ㄩ ㄥ								ㄩ ㄥ iong	Group ㄩ ü Finals
Zhuyin table		∅	ㄅ b	ㄆ p	ㄇ m	ㄈ f	ㄉ d	ㄊ t	ㄋ n	ㄌ l	ㄍ g	ㄎ k	ㄏ h	ㄐ j	ㄑ q	ㄒ x	ㄓ zh	ㄔ ch	ㄕ sh	ㄖ r	ㄗ z	ㄘ c	ㄙ s	Zhuyin table	
Zhuyin table		Initials																						Zhuyin table	

== See also ==
- Bopomofo
- Pinyin table
- Wade–Giles table
- Palladius table
- Katakana
- Hiragana
