= George A. Kennedy (sinologist) =

American academic (1901–1960)

- Born: May 7, 1901; Moganshan, Zhejiang Province, Qing Empire
- Died: August 15, 1960 (aged 59); At sea, Pacific Ocean
- Education: University of Berlin (Ph.D.); Union Theological Seminary
- Spouse: Jean Wilson
- Scientific career
- Fields: Chinese language, literature
- Workplaces: Yale University
- Academic advisors: Otto Franke; Erich Haenisch
- Notable students: John DeFrancis

Chinese name
- Chinese: 金守拙
Transcriptions
Standard Mandarin
- Hanyu Pinyin: Jīn Shǒuzhuō
- Gwoyeu Romatzyh: Jin Shooujuo
- Wade–Giles: Chin^{1} Shou^{3}-chuo^{1}
Wu
- Romanization: Jin Seu-tsüeʔ

George Alexander Kennedy (17 May 1901 – 15 August 1960) was an American sinologist known for his studies of classical Chinese and for his teaching of Chinese to students.

== Life and career ==
George Kennedy was born on 17 May 1901 in Moganshan, Zhejiang Province, China, where his parents Alexander and Ada Kennedy were serving as Protestant missionaries. Although his family spoke English at home, Kennedy grew up speaking the local Chinese dialect, a form of Wu Chinese, and often said that Chinese was his native language. The Kennedy family left China in 1918 after George's father and brother Fred died less than a month apart. They returned to the United States, where Kennedy attended the College of Wooster. From 1922 to 1925 he studied theology at the Western Theological Seminary and the Union Theological Seminary in the City of New York. During this time he became friends with Luther Carrington Goodrich, who later became professor of Chinese at Columbia University.

He returned to China in 1926 and taught English and Chinese in Shanghai. In 1932, Kennedy went to the University of Berlin, where he studied Chinese and Mongolian under Otto Franke and Erich Haenisch. In 1937, Kennedy completed his Ph.D. with dissertation on the role of confession in Chinese law. He had previously returned to the United States and worked in the Orientalia department of the Library of Congress under Arthur W. Hummel Sr., writing 72 entries in Hummel's biographical dictionary, Eminent Chinese of the Ch'ing Period. In 1936 he began teaching Chinese at Yale University. He was made an assistant professor in 1937, an associate professor in 1943, and full professor in 1954, the rank he held upon his sudden death in 1960. During World War II, Kennedy served as the director of the Army Specialized Training Program at Yale from 1942 to 1944.

In 1960, Kennedy was traveling in Asia visiting some friends and members of his family. In early August 1960, Kennedy planned to return to the United States, and boarded a ship in Yokohama, Japan, bound for San Francisco. During the voyage, Kennedy, who had not been feeling well but had not sought medical attention, died of a heart attack. An autopsy revealed that he had a number of large tumors in his body but had chosen not to have any cancer treatments.

Kennedy was the principal author of the Yale Romanization of Mandarin.

== Selected works ==
- ——— (1939). "Metrical Irregularity in the Shih Ching". Journal of the American Oriental Society. 60: 284–296.
- ——— (1940). "A Study of the Particle Yen". Journal of the American Oriental Society. 60 (2): 193–207. doi:10.2307/594007. JSTOR 594007.
- ——— (1942). "Interpretation of the Ch'un Ch'iu". Journal of the American Oriental Society. 62 (1): 40–48. doi:10.2307/594099. JSTOR 594099.
- ——— (1943). "[72 various entries on Chinese and Manchu rulers and officials]". In Hummel, Arthur W. Sr (ed.). Eminent Chinese of the Ch'ing Period. Washington: U.S. Government Printing Office.
- ——— (1953). ZH Guide: An Introduction to Sinology. New Haven: Yale University.

== References and further reading ==
- Honey, David B. (2001). Incense at the Altar: Pioneering Sinologists and the Development of Classical Chinese Philology. American Oriental Series 86. New Haven, Connecticut: American Oriental Society. ISBN 0-940490-16-1.
- Li, Tien-yi, ed. (1964). Selected Works of George A. Kennedy. New Haven: Far Eastern Publications.
- Brooks, E. Bruce, "George A. Kennedy", Sinological Profiles, Warring States Project, archived from the original on 2015-03-07
