= Erich Haenisch =

German sinologist (1880–1966)

Erich Haenisch (27 August 1880, Berlin – 21 December 1966, Stuttgart) was a German sinologist and first-degree cousin of politician Konrad Haenisch. He was the academic teacher of George Kennedy (Yale).

During World War II., Haenisch was the only German sinologist who actively intervened with the Nazi government on behalf of his colleague Henri Maspero, who had been arrested by the Gestapo and taken to Buchenwald, since his son was a member of the resistance. Since Haenisch did not receive support by his German colleagues, he could not save Maspero, who died in Buchenwald on March 17, 1945.
