= Sichuanese =

Sichuanese, Szechuanese or Szechwanese may refer to something of, from, or related to the Chinese province and region of Sichuan (Szechwan/Szechuan) (historically and culturally including Chongqing), especially:

- Sichuanese people, a subgroup of the Han Chinese
- Sichuanese culture or Ba–Shu culture
- Sichuanese cuisine
- Sichuanese embroidery
- Ba–Shu Chinese (Old Sichuanese), an extinct language in the Sinitic (Chinese) language family
- Sichuanese language, a branch of Southwest Mandarin
- Sichuanese Standard Chinese, a dialect of standard Putonghua Mandarin Chinese

== See also ==
- Szechuan sauce (disambiguation)
