= Leshan dialect =

Sichuanese dialect of the city of Leshan

Leshan
- 乐山话
- Native to: China
- Region: Shizhong District, Leshan Wutongqiao District Shawan District Qianwei County Muchuan County
- Native speakers: (undated figure of 770,000)
- Language family: Sino-Tibetan: Sinitic; Chinese; Ba–Shu (Disputed) Mandarin (Disputed); Southwestern?; Sichuanese?; Minjiang; Leshan
- Early forms: Proto-Sino-Tibetan: Old Chinese; Ba–Shu Chinese (Disputed) Middle Chinese (Disputed); Old Mandarin (Disputed)

Language codes
- ISO 639-3: –
- ISO 639-6: mjic
- Glottolog: None

The Leshan dialect (simplified Chinese: 乐山话; traditional Chinese: 樂山話; pinyin: Lèshānhuà; Sichuanese Standard Chinese: No^{2}san^{1}hua^{4}; locally [nʊʔ˧sã˥xuɑ˨]) is the Sichuanese dialect of the city of Leshan and is a variety of Minjiang. It preserves old southern (Ba-Shu) features lost in other Sichuanese dialects and is very different from the dialects of most other cities in the province of Sichuan, which are more typically Mandarin.

== Phonology ==
There are a total of 20 initials in the Leshan dialect.

		Bilabial	Labiodental	Coronal	Alveolar	Alveolo-palatal	Velar
Plosive	plain	/p/ 贝			/t/ 得		/k/ 古
Plosive	aspirated	/pʰ/ 配			/tʰ/ 套		/kʰ/ 可
Affricate	plain			/ts/ 早		/tɕ/ 价	
Affricate	aspirated			/tsʰ/ 草		/tɕʰ/ 巧	
Nasal		/m/ 没		/n/ 路			/ŋ/ 我
Fricative	voiceless		/f/ 发	/s/ 速		/ɕ/ 小	/x/ 好
Fricative	voiced		/v/ 五	/z/ 认			
Zero		∅ 衣					
