= Sichuanese people =

Han Chinese subgroup

Sichuanese people 四川人 / 川人 / 川渝人
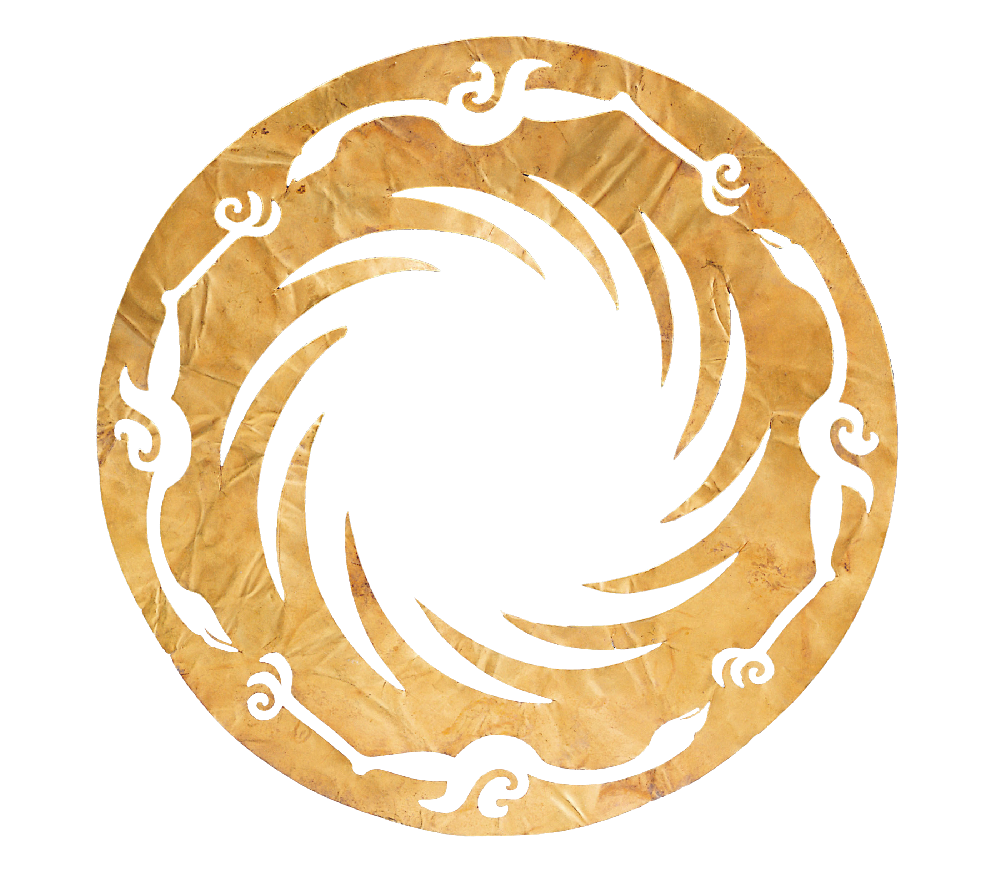
- The Golden Sun Bird, a rediscovered artifact of the Ba–Shu culture, believed to be a totem of the ancient Shu people, and the emblem of Chengdu since 2011.

Regions with significant populations
- China: Sichuan; Chongqing; Hanzhong
- Taiwan: As part of Waishengren population

Languages
- Historically Ba–Shu Chinese, also known as Old Sichuanese. Presently Sichuanese dialects of Southwestern Mandarin as well as Standard Chinese.

Religion
- Traditionally Mahayana Buddhism, Taoism, Confucianism and Chinese folk religion, but also Christianity (see Christianity in Sichuan), Islam (see Islam in Sichuan), and historically Zoroastrianism (see Zoroastrianism in Sichuan)

Related ethnic groups
- Other Han Chinese, Yi people, Tujia people and Qiang people

The Sichuanese people (Note: Chinese: 四川人; pinyin: Sìchuān rén or 川渝人; Chuānyú rén, sometimes shortened to 川人; Sichuanese Pinyin: Si^{4}cuan^{1}ren^{2}; former romanization: Szechwanese people) are a Han Chinese ethnic subgroup comprising most of the population of China's Sichuan province and the Chongqing municipality.

== History ==
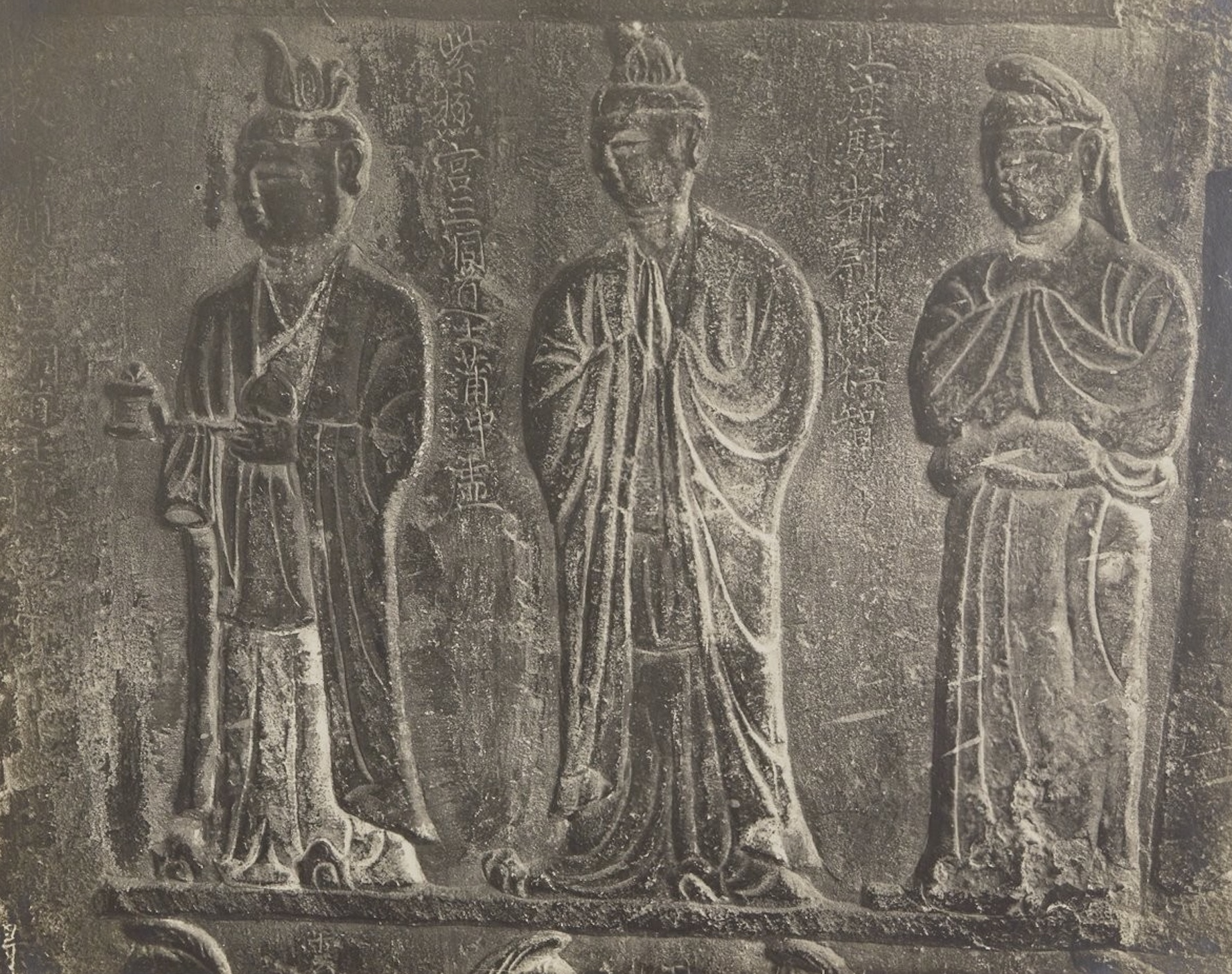
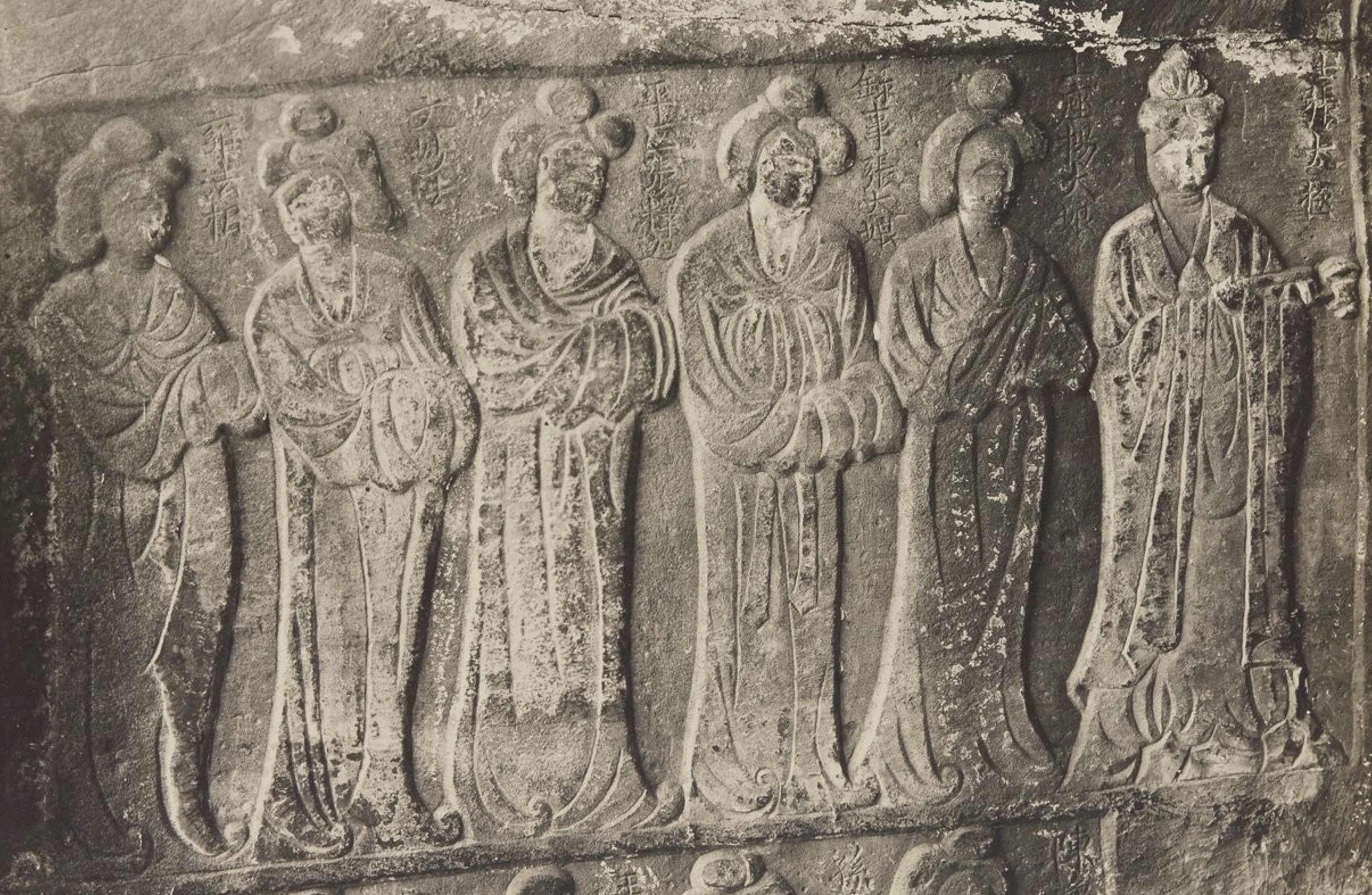
Sichuanese people in a Taoist religious procession. Reliefs from the Taoist Temple of Saints Erzhu and Yang Xiong (Temple of West Mountain), Mianyang, 7th–10th century. Photographs by Victor Segalen, mission archéologique en Chine, 1914.

Beginning from the 9th century BC, the Kingdom of Shu (on the Chengdu Plain) and the State of Ba (which had its first capital at Enshi City in Hubei and controlled part of the Han Valley) emerged as cultural and administrative centers where two rival kingdoms were established. In 316 BC, the two kingdoms were destroyed by the State of Qin. After the Qin conquest of the six warring states, the newly formed empire carried out a forced resettlement. The now-extinct Ba–Shu language was derived from Qin-era settlers and represents the earliest documented division from Middle Chinese.

South Sichuan was also inhabited by the Dai people who formed the serfs class. They were later thoroughly sinicized, adopting the local language of speech. Large numbers of foreign merchant families from Sogdia, Persia and other Central Asian countries immigrated to Sichuan. A Sogdian temple is attested in Chengdu.

During the Yuan and Ming dynasties, the population of Sichuan, Chongqing had been reduced due to immigration, deportation and flight of refugees fleeing war and plague, new or returning settlers from modern Hunan, Hubei, Guangdong and Jiangxi, replacing the earlier spoken language with different languages they adopted from the former regions to form a new standard language off communication.

=== Recent history ===
Many migrant workers from rural Sichuan have migrated to other parts of the country, where they often face discrimination in employment, housing etc. This is due to China's household registration policy and other parts of people from midwest China face the same problem.

== Culture ==
The cult for supernatural forces and entities is a long-established tradition among the Sichuanese people, tracing its roots back to the ancient Ba–Shu era. Taoism played a major role since the late antiquity with the emergence of the Way of the Celestial Master movement. Confucianism had relatively less influence, because of Ba–Shu's remoteness from the Zhongyuan region and the Qilu region. The cultural characteristics of the Sichuanese people were described in the 2014 book All about Sichuan as "a 'heretical biography' that deviated from Confucian orthodoxy, a free-spirited cultural group that opposed, despised and subverted Confucian ethics and imperial autocracy."

=== Language ===
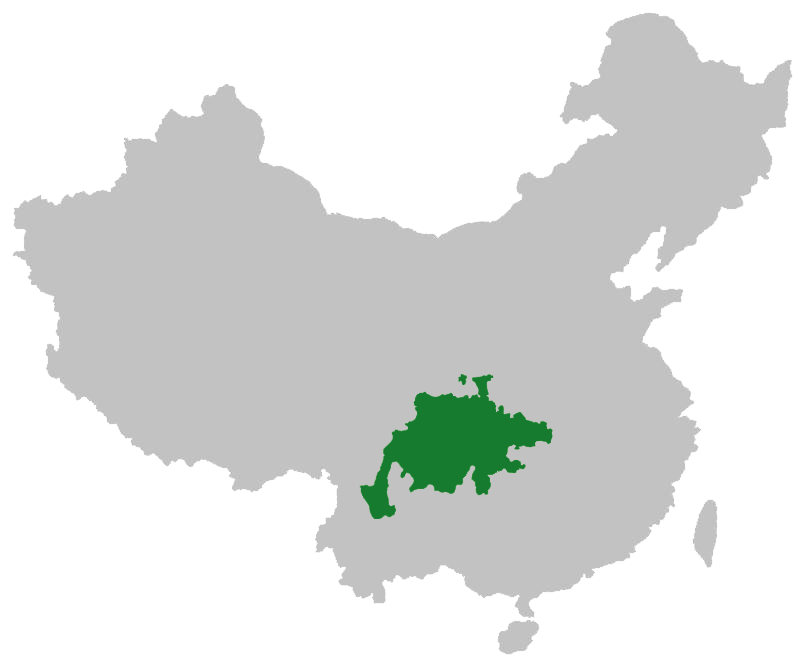
Locations of present-day Sichuanese speakers.

The Sichuanese once spoke their own variety of spoken Chinese called Ba–Shu Chinese, or Old Sichuanese before it became extinct during the Ming dynasty. Now most of them speak Sichuanese Mandarin. The Minjiang dialects are thought by some linguists to be a bona fide descendant of Old Sichuanese due to many characteristics of Ba–Shu Chinese phonology and vocabulary being found in the dialects, but there is no conclusive evidence whether Minjiang dialects are derived from Old Sichuanese or Southwestern Mandarin.

=== Cuisine ===
Sichuan is well known for its spicy cuisine and use of Sichuan peppers due to its more arid climate.

== Notable people ==
Well known Sichuanese people are such as:

- Ba Jin (1904–2005), author and political activist
- Bai Ling (1966–), actress
- Chang Dai-chien (1899–1983), artist
- Chang Qu (291–361), historian
- Chang Chun (1889–1990), premier of the Republic of China
- Fala Chen (1982–), actress
- Chen Pokong (1963–), author, political commentator and democracy activist
- Chen Shou (233–297), official and writer
- Cheung Chung-kiu (1964–), business magnate
- Deng Xiaoping (1904–1997), revolutionary and paramount leader of China
- GAI (1988–), rapper, singer, and songwriter
- Guo Moruo (1892–1978), author, poet, historian, archaeologist, and government official
- Huang Jiguang (1931–1952), highly decorated soldier during the Korean War
- Jiang Zhuyun (1920–1949), revolutionary martyr
- Li Bai (701–762), poet
- Li Bifeng (1965–), activist, poet and Christian
- Li Shou-min, better known as Huanzhulouzhu (1902–1961), novelist of the xianxia fantasy genre
- Li Shunxian (c. 900–926), Persian-Sichuanese poet
- Liu Yonghao (1952–), businessman
- Li Yifeng (1987–), actor and singer
- Li Yuchun (1984–), singer, songwriter, and actress
- Liao Yiwu (1958–), author, reporter, musician, poet, and critic of China's Communist regime
- Luo Ruiqing (1906–1978), army officer and politician
- Empress Dowager Ma (Southern Ming) (1578–1669), birth mother of the Yongli Emperor, a convert to Roman Catholicism
- Sanyu (painter) (1901–1966)
- Song Cheng-tsi (1892–1955), Anglican bishop
- Song Yonghua (1964–), scholar
- Su Shi (1037–1101), writer, poet, painter, calligrapher, pharmacologist, gastronome, and statesman
- Su Xun (1009–1066), writer
- Su Zhe (1039–1112), politician and essayist
- Tan Weiwei (1982–), singer and actress
- Tang Chun-i (1909–1978), philosopher and scholar
- Wang Jiujiang (1957–), painter
- Wang Jianlin (1954–), business magnate, investor, and philanthropist
- Wang Xiaoya (1968–), television host and media personality
- Wang Yi (1973–), Calvinist pastor and human rights advocate
- Xu Youyu (1947–), scholar
- Stephen Yang (1911–2007), surgeon, medical educator, and Quaker peace activist
- Yang Xiong (53 BC – 18 AD), poet, philosopher, and politician
- Y. C. James Yen (1890/1893–1990), educator
- Lucy Yi Zhenmei (1815–1862), Roman Catholic saint
- Yu Jie (1973–), Calvinist democracy activist
- Yue Yiqin (1914–1937), flying ace
- Zhang Lan (1872–1955), political activist
- Zhang Yong (1969/1970–), Singapore's richest man in 2019
- Zhao Yiman (1905–1936), resistance fighter
- Zheng Ji (1900–2010), nutritionist and pioneering biochemist
- Zhu De (1886–1976), ex-warlord, later revolutionary and father of the People's Liberation Army
- Zhuo Wenjun (fl. 2nd century BC), poet
- Zou Rong (1885–1905), revolutionary martyr

== See also ==
- Erlang Shen
- Jinsha site
- Sanxingdui
- Sichuan opera
- Clothing in ancient Shu
- Church of the East in Sichuan
- Catholic Church in Sichuan
- Protestantism in Sichuan
