= Zigong dialect =

Southwestern Mandarin Chinese dialect

- 自贡话
- Region: Zigong, Fushun, Weiyuan and their neighboring areas in Sichuan
- Language family: Sino-Tibetan: Sinitic; Chinese; Mandarin; Southwestern; Sichuanese; Renshou–Fushun; Zigong dialect

Language codes
- ISO 639-3: –
- Glottolog: None
- Zigong in Sichuan

The Zigong dialect (simplified Chinese: 自贡话; traditional Chinese: 自貢話; pinyin: Zìgònghuà; Wade–Giles: Tzu-kung hua) is a branch of Southwestern Mandarin, spoken mainly in Zigong, Fushun, Weiyuan, east Rongxian and some parts of Yibin, Neijiang, Longchang and other neighboring areas of Sichuan.

At least four Chinese dialects are spoken in Zigong City: the Zigong dialect, the Rongxian dialect, Hakka and the Minjiang dialect. A majority of people in Zigong speak the Zigong dialect. However, most people in Rongxian, a county of Zigong City, speak the Rongxian dialect, whose pronunciation is quite different from that of the Zigong dialect. Besides, owing to a great number of Hakka immigrants in history, a small number of Hakka people in certain towns also remain to speak Hakka. Also, the Minjiang dialect is spoken in a few remote towns or villages bordering Luzhou, Leshan and Yibin.

== History ==
The Zigong dialect differs from other branches of Sichuanese Mandarin. The modern Zigong dialect was formed rather recently in a great wave of immigration after the Qing dynasty.

Immigrants played a crucial role in the formation of the new Zigong dialect. Zigong has long been known as the "Salt Capital" for its brine extraction techniques and the attendant salt-related culture. In ancient China, salt was regarded as the energy for body and valued even more highly than gold. Therefore, salt trading was always the most profitable business and salt merchants were the wealthiest people. Hence many merchants, mainly from Hubei, Henan, Jiangxi, Fujian, Shaanxi, Shanxi and Guangdong, flooded into Zigong, bringing their Chinese varieties with them.

== Phonology ==
There are four phonemic tones in the Zigong dialect: dark level tone, light level tone, rising tone, and departing tone. The four tones all have different pitches vis a vis Mandarin. The ancient checked tone of Chinese has been redistributed entirely into the departing tone.

Tones	Pitch in the Zigong Dialect	Pitch in Mandarin	Example
1st Tone (dark level)	44	55	方 添 初 婚 中
2nd Tone (light level)	31	35	房 田 除 危 雄
3rd Tone (ascending)	53	214	仿 舔 储 碗 晚
4th Tone (departing)	24	51	放 到 稻 犒 看
Dark departing	24 (literary); 55 (colloquial)	51	是 树 抱 地 路
Checked tone	24 (modern); 13 (traditional)		黑 急 各 铁 杂

There are 24 initials in the Zigong dialect. The Zigong dialect can clearly differentiate retroflex consonants and alveolo-palatal consonants, while most dialects of Sichuanese Mandarin can not.

There are 38 finals in the Zigong dialect.

=== Differences in colloquial and literary pronunciations ===
Example	Colloquial Reading	Literary Reading
在	在[te^{4}]那旮ㄢ（kan^{1}）	存在[tsai^{4}]
着	看着[tou^{3}] 睡着[tʂʰo^{1}]了	着[tʂao^{2}]打 着[tʂo^{4}]装
去	去[ʨi^{4}]哪里	去[ʨʼy^{4}]除
严	把门关严[ŋan^{2}]	严[ȵian^{2}]肃
下	等一下[xa^{1}]	下[ɕia^{4}]午
等	等[tʰən^{4}]几天	等[tən^{3}]待
院	医院[uan^{4}]	院[yan^{4}]落
凭	凭[pʰen^{1}]着栏杆	凭[pʰin^{4}]据

=== Words with different meanings ===
These words have meanings in the Zigong dialect entirely different from those in Mandarin.

Word	Meaning in the Zigong Dialect	Meaning in Mandarin
造孽	pitiful	Original character is "造業", a Buddhist term, meaning all the actions of the body, mouth, and mind
饮	use water or fertilizer on plants	give water to animals
跑马	nocturnal emission	ride a horse quickly; race horses
生	to be close, in love; to pass one's birthday	to give birth; to grow; life
不好	to be ill	not good
醒	to go bad (eggs)	secondary fermentation
