= Chengdu-Chongqing dialect =

Variety of Mandarin Chinese

- 成渝话
- Pronunciation: [tsʰən˨˩y˨˩xua˨˨˦]
- Native to: China
- Region: Sichuan, Chongqing, Hubei and Shaanxi
- Native speakers: (undated figure of About 90 million)
- Language family: Sino-Tibetan: Sinitic; Chinese; Mandarin; Southwestern Mandarin; Sichuanese; Chengdu-Chongqing dialect

Language codes
- ISO 639-3: –
- Glottolog: chen1267 Chengdu Mandarin
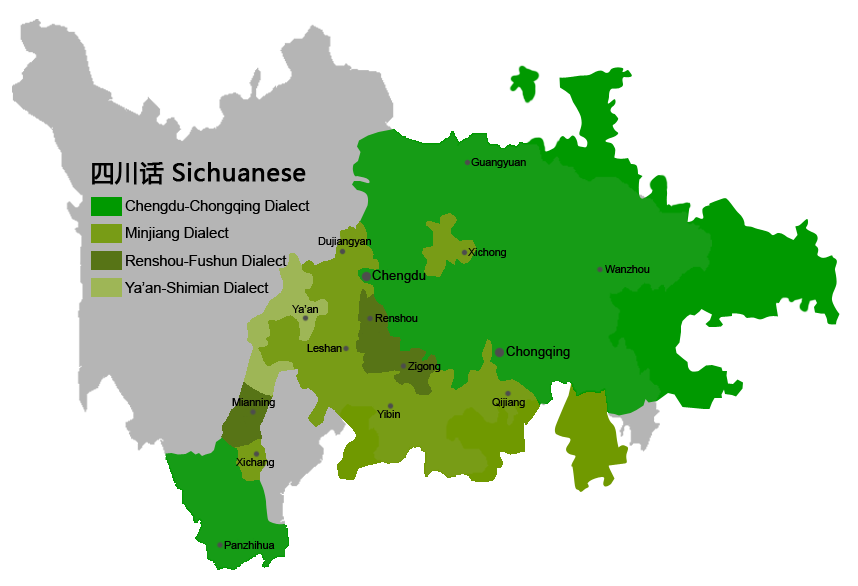
- Chengdu-Chongqing is the largest deep-green area.

Chengdu-Chongqing dialect or Cheng–Yu (Chinese: 成渝; pinyin: Chéng-Yú; Sichuanese Pinyin: Cen^{2}yu^{2}, locally [tsʰən˨˩y˨˩]) is the most widely used branch of Southwestern Mandarin, with about 90 million speakers. It is named after Chengdu, the capital city of Sichuan, and Chongqing, which was under the administration of the province of Sichuan from 1954 to 1997. It is spoken mainly in northern and eastern Sichuan, the northeastern part of the Chengdu Plain, several cities or counties in southwestern Sichuan (Panzhihua, Dechang, Yanyuan, Huili and Ningnan), southern Shaanxi and western Hubei.

This dialect was formed after significant migrations during the Ming and Qing dynasty, and is greatly influenced by the Chinese varieties of Mandarin the immigrants spoke from Hubei, as well as Xiang and Gan. It thus keeps fewer characteristics of Sichuan's original Ba-Shu Chinese than other Sichuanese dialects, such as the Minjiang dialect.

== Distributions ==
Chengdu-Chongqing Dialect is spoken within central Chongqing, Chengdu and surrounding provinces. Chengdu-Chongqing dialect is a branch of Sichuan dialect.

Academically speaking, Chongqing dialects are spoken in main urban area of Chongqing, containing one-fifth of the population of the city.

In a broad sense, the Chongqing dialect is spoken in all districts of Chongqing City. Eg: Tongliang District, Hechuan District, Fuling District, Zhanjiang District, etc. Chongqing dialect is considered a branch of Southwestern Mandarin.

The Chengdu-Chongqing dialect is mutually intelligible with dialects spoken in the satellite districts of Sichuan. But, as all public schools and most broadcast communication in urban Chongqing exclusively use Mandarin, nearly all speakers of the dialect also speak Mandarin. Owing to migration within China, the traditional Chongqing dialect is becoming more similar to Mandarin. Many residents of the city cannot speak the local dialect but can usually understand it, and attain fluency in it after spending a few months or years in the area.

== History ==
When the Chinese government made Chongqing the provisional capital of the Republic of China during the Second Sino-Japanese War, migration from elsewhere boosted the population of the city. Chongqing dialect mixes the merits of various local dialects, with wits and humor, gains popularity with its users.

== Phonology ==
=== Tone ===
Chengdu-Chongqing dialect has four phonemic tones: dark level tone, light level tone, rising tone and departing tone. These tones are of same pitch as Sichuan dialects (Minjiang, Renfu, Yajin).

District	Dark level tone	Light level tone	Rising tone	Departing tone
Chengdu	55	31	53	213
Chongqing	55	21	42	214
Guangyuan	55	21	42	214
Nanchong	55	21	53	14
Jinyang	55	31	52	13
Wanzhou	55	213	42	215
Yichang	55	12	42	35
Qianjiang	55	31	53	24
QIanjiang	55	31	53	24
Panzhihua	55	31	53	213

==== Tone Sandhi ====
Generally, tone sandhi is split into 4 categories.

The first type involves reduplicated words: generally, if the constituent characters have a light level tone (2nd tone) or departing tone (4th tone), the second character changes to the dark level tone (1st tone). Examples: (爸爸[pa^{2}pa^{1}], 婆婆[pʰo^{2}pʰo^{1}], 舅舅[tɕiəu^{4}tɕiəu^{1}], 帕帕[pʰa^{4}pʰa^{1}]). If the constituent characters have a rising tone (3rd tone), the second character changes to the light level tone. Examples:(姐姐[tɕiai^{3}tɕiai^{2}], 板板[pan^{3}pan^{2}]).

The second type involves words ending in 兒 (i.e. Erization). If there is one character before the 兒 and it has the 2nd tone, the 兒 character changes to the 1st tone. Examples: (娃儿[ua^{2}ɚ^{1}], 瓢儿[pʰiau^{2}ɚ^{1}]). If there is a two-character compound before the 兒, the character before the 兒 changes into the 1st tone. Examples: (葡萄_{儿}[pʰu^{2}tʰɚ^{1}], 麻雀_{儿}[ma^{2}tɕʰyɚ^{1}]).

The third type involves specific characters. For example, function word characters like 去, 頭, 面, 上 change into the 1st tone in most of the cases. Examples: (上去[saŋ^{4}tɕʰe^{1}], 屋头[vu^{2}tʰəu^{1}], 外面[uai^{4}mian^{1}], 身上[sen^{1}saŋ^{1}]).

The fourth type involves two-character compounds and three-character compounds. In many cases, the 2nd character's tone changes into the 1st tone. Examples: (姑娘[ku^{2}niaŋ^{1}], 经佑[tɕin^{1}iəu^{1}], 院坝[yuən^{4}pa^{1}], 龙门阵[noŋ^{2}mən^{1}tsən^{4}], 明年子[min^{2}nʲian^{1}tsɿ^{3}]).

=== Initial ===
The Chengdu-Chongqing dialect in most regions doesn't have tongue retroflex (tʂ group initials), except for Bazhong district and Panxi area (except for Panzhihua), where the consonants of the tongue curling are similar but not the same as Mandarin. Chongqing dialect with 45 districts using it has 20 initials, 5 initials do not exist: [ʈʂ], [ʈʂʰ], [ʂ], [ʐ~ɻ], [ȵ]; Chengdu dialect with 77 districts it using has 21 initials, 4 initials do not exist: [ʈʂ], [ʈʂʰ], [ʂ], [ʐ~ɻ].

The following is the initial consonant inventory of Chengdu-Chongqing dialect:

		Bilabial	Labiodental	Coronal	Alveolo-palatal	Velar
Plosive	plain	b [p]		d [t]		g [k]
Plosive	aspirated	p [pʰ]		t [tʰ]		k [kʰ]
Affricate	plain			z [ts]	j [tɕ]	
Affricate	aspirated			c [tsʰ]	q [tɕʰ]	
Fricative	Voiceless		f [f]	s [s]	x [ɕ]	h [x]
Fricative	Voiced		v [v]	r [z]		
Nasal		m [m]		n [n]		ng [ŋ]
Lateral sound				l [l]		
Zero		∅				

In particular, the consonants of Chengdu are comparable but not identical to those in Mandarin. See the inventories below:

	Labial		Coronal		Alveopalatal		Velar	
Plosive	p	pʰ	t	tʰ			k	kʰ
Affricate			ts	tsʰ	tɕ	tɕʰ		
Nasal	m		n		ɲ		ŋ	
Liquid			l, r					
Fricative	f	v	s	z	ɕ		x	
Glide	ɥ				j		w	

=== Final ===
A final, the remainder of syllable after the initial, consists of an optional medial glide, a vowel and an optional final consonants. There are 42 types of finals in Sichuan dialect; four Sichuanese finals do not exist in Beijing: [ɛ], [iai], [uɛ], and [yo]. On the other hand, three Beijing finals do not exist in Sichuanese: [ɤ], [iŋ], and [əŋ]. Chengdu dialect with 62 districts using it has 36 finals, Chongqing dialect with 37 districts using it has 37 finals.

The following is the inventory of Sichuanese finals, transcribed in the International Phonetic Alphabet:

	-Ø					-i or -u				nasal finals			
Ø-	/z̩/ i	/ɚ/ er	/a/ a	/o/ o	/ɛ/ e	/ai/ ai	/ei/ ei	/au/ ao	/əu/ ou	/an/ an	/ən/ en	/aŋ/ ang	/oŋ/ ong
i-	/i/ i		/ia/ ia		/iɛ/ ie	/iai/ iai		/iau/ iao	/iəu/ iu	/ian/ ian	/in/ in	/iaŋ/ iang	
u-	/u/ u		/ua/ ua		/uɛ/ ue	/uai/ uai	/uei/ ui			/uan/ uan	/uən/ un	/uaŋ/ uang	
y-	/y/ ü			/yo/ üo	/ye/ üe						/yn/ ün		/yoŋ/ iong

=== Vowels and consonants ===
The tones of the Chongqing-Chengdu dialect are very similar, but not the same as that of Sichuanese. About one third of Sichuan dialects have a special entering tone, with a relatively independent set of finals, e.g.: [iæ], [uæ], [ʊ], [ɘ], [ɐ], [iɐ], [uɐ], [ɔ], [yʊ], [yɵ], etc. These vowels keep the throat tight, ensuring the muscles of the larynx and oral cavity stay tense during pronunciation, so that the entire syllable exhibits a rough and tight state.

The vowels in Chengdu are given below:

	Front	Central	Back
High	i	y	u
Mid	ε	ə	ɔ
Low		ɑ	

The following table shows the tense vowels of Chengdu-Chongqing dialect, and a comparison with other Sichuanese dialects:

Example	Chengdu-Chongqing		Minjiang	Renshou-Fushun
	Chengdu	Chongqing	Luzhou	Zigong
搭	[a]	[a]	[æ]	[a]
说	[o]	[o]	[ɵ]	[o]
黑	[ɛ]	[ɛ]	[e]	[ɛ]
踢	[iɛ]	[i]	[ie]	[i]
出	[u]	[u]	[ɵ]	[u]
欲	[yo]	[yu]	[yɵ]	[yi]
湿	[z̩]	[z̩]	[ə]	[z̩]
掐	[ia]	[ia]	[iæ]	[ia]
刮	[ua]	[ua]	[uæ]	[ua]
铁	[iɛ]	[iɛ]	[ie]	[iɛ]
获	[uɛ]	[uɛ]	[ɵ]	[ue]
阅	[yɛ]	[yɛ]	[yɵ]	[yɛ]
药	[yo]	[yo]	[yɵ]	[yo]

=== Literary and colloquial readings of Chongqing-Chengdu dialect ===
Affected by Mandarin for a long time, literary and colloquial readings appear in the Chongqing-Chengdu dialect. Colloquial readings are usually the inherent reading style from the ancient Sichuan dialect, mainly appearing in high-frequency everyday communication; literary readings are close to modern Mandarin, normally appearing in written language. The literary and colloquial readings have been developing in the recent decades. However, affected by the promotion of Mandarin Chinese by the Chinese government, literary readings are becoming dominant, and some pronunciations have the tendency to disappear. Literary and colloquial readings of Chinese characters in Chengdu are shown below. Note: the table is only based on 《成都语音的初步研究》in 1958, the changes of Chengdu dialect in recent years are not considered:

Example	Colloquial reading	Literary Reading
严	ŋan^{2}	nʲian^{2}
下	xa^{4}	ɕia^{4}
等	tʰən^{4}	tən^{3}
横	xuan^{3}	xuən^{2}
胯	kʰa^{2}	kʰua^{4}
逼	pie^{1}	pi^{2}

== Vocabulary ==
As a branch of Sichuanese, Chengdu-Chongqing dialect is mainly composed of three parts: ancient Ba-Shu Chinese, vocabulary brought by immigrants in Ming and Qing Dynasties, and lingua franca of ancient China.

Chengdu-Chongqing dialect is a branch of Sichuan dialect, which is very different compared with other Chinese. Yunnan dialect, which is considered very similar to Sichuan dialect, only shares 58.3% identical words. Sichuan dialect is also influenced by Xiang Chinese and Gan Chinese, the vocabulary of Sichuan dialect is very different from northern Mandarin, with only 47.8% similar vocabulary.

Recently, many loanwords have been introduced to Chengdu and Chongqing from standard Mandarin and English. Meanwhile, new words are developing in Chengdu and Chongqing, which then spread at a dramatic speed through China. For example, “雄起”(xióng qǐ) (meaning to "cheer up"), is a typical Chengdu-Chongqing word that gets popular in China, equivalent to "加油" (jiāyóu) in standard Mandarin.
