= Sichuanese characters =

Chinese characters used only in written Sichuanese

Sichuanese characters (Chinese: 四川方言字; Sichuanese Pinyin: Si^{4}cuan^{1} fang^{1}yan^{2}zi^{4}; pinyin: Sìchuān fāngyánzì; Wade–Giles: Szŭ^{4}-ch'uan^{1} fang^{1}-yen^{2}-tzŭ^{4}) are those Chinese characters used only in written Sichuanese. Sichuanese characters are often created as ideogrammatic compound characters (会意字) or phono-semantic compound characters (形声字).

For example, in Sichuanese 𨈓 (Sichuanese Pinyin: nang^{1}) means "thin", and it is created in ideogrammatic compounds as shown in the table below:

身(body) + 小(small) = 𨈓
small body → thin

Furthermore, 㧯 (Sichuanese Pinyin: nao^{3}), which means 'to lift" in Sichuanese, is created as a phono-semantic compound character as shown in the table below:

Determinative	Rebus	Compound
扌 hand	老 nao^{3}	㧯 nao^{3} "to lift with hand"

== Examples ==
Sichuanese character	Sichuanese Pinyin	meaning	Standard Chinese character with similar meaning
𢭃	dou^{4}	to compose	拼
搣	mie^{3}	to tear	掰
𤆺	kong^{3}	a local way to cook	none
𠵫	ngang^{3}	loud	响
𨃅	bai^{1}	lame	瘸
𨈓	nang^{1}	thin	瘦
𤆵	pa^{1}	soft	软
朒	ga^{3}	meat	肉
奓	za^{1}	open	张
㮟	ka^{1} or qia^{1}	to jam into	塞
𣲩	pa^{2}	a local quantifier	滩
㞎	ba^{3}	excrement	屎
𧿨	ban^{3}	to struggle	挣扎
𧽤	biao^{1}	to run fast	none
𢱟	can^{3}	to slap	扇
𢲵	cao^{4}	to stir	搅
𡘧	ka^{2} or qia^{2}	to step across	跨
㩳	song^{3}	to push	推
𰀆	gu^{1}	to crouch	蹲
𰍧𰍨	din^{1}ga^{1}	small	小
㥑	ngou^{4}	to irritate, to become irritated, to become broken-hearted	慪 / 怄
餈	ci^{2}	a local dessert	none
