= Spelling in Gwoyeu Romatzyh =

Chinese romanization spelling

The spelling of Gwoyeu Romatzyh (GR) can be divided into its treatment of initials, finals and tones. GR uses contrasting unvoiced/voiced pairs of consonants to represent aspirated and unaspirated initials in Chinese: for example b and p represent IPA [p] and [pʰ]. The letters j, ch and sh represent two different series of initials: the alveolo-palatal and the retroflex sounds. Although these spellings create no ambiguity in practice, readers more familiar with Pinyin should pay particular attention to them: GR ju, for example, corresponds to Pinyin zhu, not ju (which is spelled jiu in GR).

Many of the finals in GR are similar to those used in other romanizations. Distinctive features of GR include the use of iu for the close front rounded vowel spelled ü or simply u in Pinyin. Final -y represents certain allophones of i: GR shy and sy correspond to Pinyin shi and si respectively.

The most striking feature of GR is its treatment of tones. The first tone is represented by the basic form of each syllable, the spelling being modified according to precise but complex rules for the other three tones. For example the syllable spelled ai (first tone) becomes air, ae and ay in the other tones. A neutral (unstressed) tone can optionally be indicated by preceding it with a dot or full stop: for example perng.yeou "friend".

Rhotacization, a common feature of Mandarin (especially Beijing) Chinese, is marked in GR by the suffix -l. Owing to the rather complex orthographical details, a given rhotacized form may correspond to more than one non-rhotacized syllable: for example, jiel can mean either "today" (from jin) or "chick" (from ji).

A number of frequently occurring morphemes have abbreviated spellings in GR. The most common of these, followed by their Pinyin equivalents, are: -g (-ge), -j (-zhe), -m (-me), sh (shi) and -tz (-zi).

== Basic forms ==
GR, like Pinyin, uses contrasting unvoiced/voiced pairs of consonants to represent aspirated and unaspirated sounds in Chinese. For example b and p represent IPA [p] and [pʰ] (p and p' in Wade-Giles). Another feature of GR surviving in Pinyin is the representation of words (usually of two syllables) as units: e.g. Beeijing rather than the Wade-Giles Pei^{3}-ching^{1}.

The basic features of GR spelling are shown in the following tables of initials and finals, the latter referring to the basic T1 forms. Many of the spelling features are the same as in Pinyin; differences are highlighted in the tables and discussed in detail after the second table. The rules of tonal spelling follow in a separate section.

In the tables Pinyin spellings are given only where they differ from GR, in which case they appear in (parentheses). The tables also give the pronunciation in [brackets].

=== Initials ===
		Labial	Alveolar	Retroflex	Alveolo-palatal	Velar
Nasal		m [m] ㄇ	n [n] ㄋ			
Plosive	unaspirated	b [p] ㄅ	d [t] ㄉ			g [k] ㄍ
Plosive	aspirated	p [pʰ] ㄆ	t [tʰ] ㄊ			k [kʰ] ㄎ
Affricate	unaspirated		tz [ts] ㄗ (z)	j [ʈʂ] ㄓ (zh)	ji [tɕ] ㄐ (j)	
Affricate	aspirated		ts [tsʰ] ㄘ (c)	ch [ʈʂʰ] ㄔ	chi [tɕʰ] ㄑ (q)	
Fricative		f [f] ㄈ	s [s] ㄙ	sh [ʂ] ㄕ	shi [ɕ] ㄒ (x)	h [x] ㄏ
Liquid			l [l] ㄌ	r [ɻ~ʐ] ㄖ		

Key
GR differs from Pinyin

=== Finals ===
		Coda													
		∅				/i/		/u/		/n/		/ŋ/			/ɻ/
Medial	∅	-y [ɨ] ㄭ (-i)	e [ɤ] ㄜ	è [ɛ] ㄝ	a [a] ㄚ	ei [ei] ㄟ	ai [ai] ㄞ	ou [ou] ㄡ	au [au] ㄠ (ao)	en [ən] ㄣ	an [an] ㄢ	ong [ʊŋ] ㄨㄥ	eng [əŋ] ㄥ	ang [aŋ] ㄤ	el [aɚ] ㄦ (er)
Medial	/j/	i [i] ㄧ	ie [je] ㄧㄝ		ia [ja] ㄧㄚ		iai [jai] ㄧㄞ	iou [jou] ㄧㄡ (iu)	iau [jau] ㄧㄠ (iao)	in [in] ㄧㄣ	ian [jɛn] ㄧㄢ	iong [jʊŋ] ㄩㄥ	ing [iŋ] ㄧㄥ	iang [jaŋ] ㄧㄤ	
Medial	/w/	u [u] ㄨ	uo/o [wo] ㄨㄛ		ua [wa] ㄨㄚ	uei [wei] ㄨㄟ (ui)	uai [wai] ㄨㄞ			uen [wən] ㄨㄣ (un)	uan [wan] ㄨㄢ		ueng [wəŋ] ㄨㄥ	uang [waŋ] ㄨㄤ	
Medial	/ɥ/	iu [y] ㄩ (ü)	iue [ɥe] ㄩㄝ (üe)							iun [yn] ㄩㄣ (ün)	iuan [ɥɛn] ㄩㄢ (üan)				

Key
GR differs from Pinyin

=== Spelling ===
GR basic (T1) spellings are compared to the spelling conventions of Pinyin in the table below. A separate table, after the tonal rules, compares spellings using all four tones.

==== Alveolar and retroflex series ====
The letter j and the digraphs ch and sh represent two different series of sounds. When followed by i they correspond to the alveolo-palatal sounds (Pinyin j, q, and x); otherwise they correspond to the retroflex sounds (Pinyin zh, ch, and sh). In practice this feature creates no ambiguity, because the two series of consonants are in complementary distribution. Nevertheless it does make the correspondence between GR and Pinyin spellings difficult to follow. In some cases they agree (chu is the same syllable in both systems); but in other cases they differ—sometimes confusingly so (for example, GR ju, jiu and jiou correspond to Pinyin zhu, ju and jiu respectively).

This potential for confusion can be seen graphically in the table of initials, where the bold letters j, ch and sh cut across the highlighted division between alveolo-palatal and retroflex.

==== Other differences from Pinyin ====
GR also differs from Pinyin in its transcription of vowels and semivowels:

- GR uses iu for the close front rounded vowel (IPA y) spelled ü or in many cases simply u in Pinyin. (The contracted Pinyin iu is written iou in GR.)
- Final -y represents the [ɨ] allophone of i: GR shy and sy correspond to Pinyin shi and si respectively.
- No basic forms in GR begin with w- or y-: Pinyin ying and wu are written ing and u in GR (but only in T1).

Other important GR spellings which differ from Pinyin include:

- GR writes au for Pinyin ao (but see the rule for T3).
- el corresponds to Pinyin er (-r being reserved to indicate T2). The most important use of -(e)l is as a rhotacization suffix.
- GR uses ts for Pinyin c and tz for Pinyin z.
- -uen and -uei correspond to the contracted Pinyin forms -un and -ui.
- GR also has three letters for dialectal sounds: v (万 in extended Zhuyin), ng (兀), and gn (广).

As in Pinyin, an apostrophe is used to clarify syllable divisions. Pin'in, the GR spelling of the word "Pinyin", is itself a good example: the apostrophe shows that the compound is made up of pin + in rather than pi + nin.

=== Pinyin comparison: basic forms ===
The following list summarizes the differences between GR and Pinyin spelling. The list is in GR alphabetical order (click the button next to the heading to change to Pinyin order).

GR	Pinyin
au	ao
ch(i)	q
è	ê
el	er
iau	iao
iou	iu
iu	u (qu), ü
iue	ue (que), üe
iuan	uan (quan)
iun	un (qun)
j(a,e,u,y)	zh
sh(i)	x
ts	c
tz	z
uei	ui
uen	un (chun)
y (final)	i (zhi, ci, shi)

== Tonal rules ==
Note: In this section the word "tone" is abbreviated as "T": thus T1 stands for Tone 1, or first tone; T2 stands for Tone 2, or second tone; etc.

Wherever possible GR indicates tones 2, 3 and 4 by respelling the basic T1 form of the syllable, replacing a vowel with another having a similar sound (i with y or e, for example). But this concise procedure cannot be applied in every case, since the syllable may not contain a suitable vowel for modification. In such cases a letter (r or h) is added or inserted instead. The precise rule to be followed in any specific case is determined by the rules given below.

A colour-coded rule of thumb is given below for each tone: the same colours are used below in a list of provinces. Each rule of thumb is then amplified by a comprehensive set of rules for that tone. These codes are used in the rules:

- V = a vowel
- NV = a non-vowel (either a consonant or zero in the case of an initial vowel)
- ⇏ = "but avoid forming [the specified combination]"

Pinyin equivalents are given in brackets after each set of examples. To illustrate the GR tonal rules in practice, a table comparing Pinyin and GR spellings of some Chinese provinces follows the detailed rules.

Tone 1 (high): basic form

- Initial sonorants (l-/m-/n-/r-): insert -h- as second letter. rheng, mha (rēng, mā)
- Otherwise use the basic form.

Tone 2 (rising): i/u → y/w; or add -r

- Initial sonorants: use basic form. reng, ma (réng, má)
- NiV → NyV ( + -i if final). chyng, chyan, yng, yan, pyi (qíng, qián, yíng, yán, pí)
- NuV → NwV ( + -u if final). chwan, wang, hwo, chwu (chuán, wáng, huó, chú)
- Otherwise add r to vowel or diphthong. charng, bair (cháng, bái)

Tone 3 (dipping/falling): i/u → e/o; or double vowel

- Vi or iV → Ve or eV (⇏ee). chean, bae, sheau (qiǎn, bǎi, xiǎo), but not *gee
- Vu or uV → Vo or oV (⇏oo). doan, dao, shoei (duǎn, dǎo, shuǐ), but not *hoo
- When both i and u can be found, only the first one changes, i.e. jeau, goai, sheu (jiǎo, guǎi, xǔ), not *jeao, *goae, *sheo
- For basic forms starting with i-/u-, change the starting i-/u- to e-/o- and add initial y-/w-. yean, woo, yeu (yǎn, wǒ, yǔ)
- Otherwise double the (main) vowel. chiing, daa, geei, huoo, goou (qǐng, dǎ, gěi, huǒ, gǒu)

Tone 4 (falling): change/double final letter; or add -h

- Vi → Vy. day, suey (dài, suì)
- Vu → Vw (⇏iw). daw, gow (dào, gòu), but not *chiw
- -n → -nn. duann (duàn)
- -l → -ll. ell (èr)
- -ng → -nq. binq (bìng)
- Otherwise add h. dah, chiuh, dih (dà, qù, dì)
- For basic forms starting with i-/u-, replace initial i-/u- with y-/w-, in addition to the necessary tonal change. yaw, wuh (yào, wù)

Neutral tone (轻声 Chingsheng / qīngshēng)

A dot (usually written as a period or full stop) may be placed before neutral tone (unstressed) syllables, which appear in their original tonal spelling: perng.yeou, dih.fang (péngyou, dìfang). Y.R. Chao used this device in the first eight chapters of the Mandarin Primer, restricting it thereafter to new words on their first appearance. In A Grammar of Spoken Chinese he introduced a subscript circle (˳) to indicate an optional neutral tone, as in bujy˳daw, "don't know" (Pinyin pronunciation bùzhīdào or bùzhīdao).

GR u- and i- syllables

Any GR syllables beginning u- or i- must be T1: in T2, T3 and T4 these syllables all begin with w- or y- respectively. An example in all four tones is the following: ing, yng, yiing, yinq (Pinyin ying).

=== Rime table ===
The term rime, as used by linguists, is similar to rhyme. See Rime table.

Rimes in Gwoyeu Romatzyh
IPA	Tone 1	Tone 2	Tone 3	Tone 4	IPA	Tone 1	Tone 2	Tone 3	Tone 4	IPA	Tone 1	Tone 2	Tone 3	Tone 4	IPA	Tone 1	Tone 2	Tone 3	Tone 4
[ɨ]	-y	-yr	-yy	-yh	[i]	i	yi	ii (yii)	ih (yih)	[u]	u	wu	uu (wuu)	uh (wuh)	[y]	iu	yu	eu (yeu)	iuh (yuh)
[a]	a	ar	aa	ah	[ja]	ia	ya	ea (yea)	iah (yah)	[wa]	ua	wa	oa (woa)	uah (wah)					
[ai]	ai	air	ae	ay	[jai]	iai	yai	eai (yeai)	iay (yay)	[wai]	uai	wai	oai (woai)	uay (way)					
[au]	au	aur	ao	aw	[jau]	iau	yau	eau (yeau)	iaw (yaw)										
[an]	an	arn	aan	ann	[jɛn]	ian	yan	ean (yean)	iann (yann)	[wan]	uan	wan	oan (woan)	uann (wann)	[ɥɛn]	iuan	yuan	euan (yeuan)	iuann (yuann)
[aŋ]	ang	arng	aang	anq	[jaŋ]	iang	yang	eang (yeang)	ianq (yanq)	[waŋ]	uang	wang	oang (woang)	uanq (wanq)					
[ɛ]	è	èr	èè	èh															
[ɤ]	e	er	ee	eh	[je]	ie	ye	iee (yee)	ieh (yeh)	[wo]	uo	wo	uoo (woo)	uoh (woh)	[ɥe]	iue	yue	eue (yeue)	iueh (yueh)
[ei]	ei	eir	eei	ey						[wei]	uei	wei	oei (woei)	uey (wey)					
[ou]	ou	our	oou	ow	[jou]	iou	you	eou (yeou)	iow (yow)										
[ən]	en	ern	een	enn	[in]	in	yn	iin (yiin)	inn (yinn)	[wən]	uen	wen	oen (woen)	uenn (wenn)	[yn]	iun	yun	eun (yeun)	iunn (yunn)
[əŋ]	eng	erng	eeng	enq	[iŋ]	ing	yng	iing (yiing)	inq (yinq)	[ʊŋ] [wəŋ]	ong (ueng)	orng (weng)	oong (woeng)	onq (wenq)	[jʊŋ]	iong	yong	eong (yeong)	ionq (yonq)
[aɚ]	el	erl	eel	ell															

=== Pinyin comparison: all tones ===
This table illustrates the GR tonal rules in use by listing some Chinese provinces in both GR and Pinyin. The tonal spelling markers or "clues" are highlighted using the same colour-coding scheme as above. Note that T1 is the default tone: hence Shinjiang (Xīnjiāng), for example, is spelled using the basic form of both syllables.

GR	Pinyin
Chinghae	Qīnghǎi
Fwujiann	Fújiàn
Goangdong	Guǎngdōng
Herbeei	Héběi
Hwunan	Húnán
Jehjiang	Zhèjiāng
Neymengguu	Nèiménggǔ
Shaanshi	Shǎnxī
Shanshi	Shānxī
Shinjiang	Xīnjiāng
Shitzanq	Xīzàng
Syhchuan	Sìchuān

GR tone key
Tone 1 (basic form: unmarked) Tone 2 Tone 3 Tone 4

== Rhotacization ==
Erhua (simplified Chinese: 儿化; traditional Chinese: 兒化), or the rhotacized or retroflex ending, is indicated in GR by -l rather than -r, which is already used as a T2 marker. The appropriate tonal modification is then applied to the basic rhotacized form: for example shell (Pinyin shìr) from the basic form shel, and deal (diǎnr) from the basic form dial. In the fourth tone, certain syllables don't double the l but are instead spelled by first writing the non-rhotacized syllable in the fourth tone and then adding l: (-i/y)awl, (-i/y)owl, (-i/y/-u/w/)anql, (-i/y/w)enql, (-i/y)onql, ehl (from e’l, the basic rhotacized form of e; compare ell from el, which is both the basic rhotacized form of en, ei, and y and a basic Mandarin syllable).

Most other romanization systems preserve the underlying form, but GR transcribes the surface form as pronounced. These are the principles followed to create the basic form of a rhotacized syllable in GR:

1. -l is added to the final's basic non-rhotacized form
2. -y becomes -e-
3. i becomes ie-, and iu becomes iue-
4. in becomes ie-, and iun becomes iue-; in all other cases, -n disappears without trace
5. ing becomes ieng-
6. final asyllabic -i (found in (i/u)ai and (u)ei) disappears
7. with the final e, an apostrophe is added before the -l, i.e. e’l, er’l, ee’l (to separate them from el, erl, eel), except in the fourth tone, where the spelling is ehl (as this is sufficient to separate it from ell)
8. with the finals ie and iue, an apostrophe is added in the first and second tones only, i.e. ie’l, ye’l, -ieel/yeel, -iell/yell and iue’l, yue’l, -yeuel/-euel, -iuell/yuell

Thus, the basic rhotacized final

- el corresponds to the basic non-rhotacized finals en, ei, and -y and is also a basic Mandarin syllable
- uel corresponds to uen and uei
- iel corresponds to i and in; in the third and fourth tones, it also corresponds to ie
- iuel corresponds to iu and iun; in the third and fourth tones, it also corresponds to iue
- al corresponds to a, an, and ai
- ial corresponds to ia, ian, and iai
- ual corresponds to ua, uan, and uai

As a consequence, the one-to-one correspondence between GR and Pinyin is broken, since one GR rhotacized form may correspond to several Pinyin forms. For example, jiel corresponds to both jīr and jīnr (both pronounced [t͡ɕjɚ˥]), and jial corresponds to both jiār and jiānr (both pronounced [t͡ɕjaɚ̯˥]).

== Tone sandhi ==
The most important manifestation of tone sandhi in Mandarin is the change of a T3 syllable to T2 when followed by another T3 syllable (T3 + T3 → T2 + T3). GR does not reflect this change in the spelling: the word for "fruit" is written shoeiguoo, even though the pronunciation is shweiguoo. Four common words with more complicated tone sandhi (also ignored in the spelling) are mentioned below under Exceptions.

== Abbreviations ==
A number of frequently-occurring morphemes have abbreviated spellings in GR. The commonest of these, followed by their Pinyin equivalents, are:

- -g (-ge)
- -j (-zhe)
- -m (-me)

occurs in sherm (shénme), jemm/tzemm (zhème) and tzeem (zěnme)

- sh (shi)

also in compounds such as jiowsh (jiùshi), dannsh (dànshi), etc.

- -tz (-zi)

== Reduplication ==
In its original form GR used the two "spare" letters of the alphabet, v and x, to indicate reduplication. This mimicked the method by which the Japanese writing system indicates repeated Kanji characters with an iteration mark (々). In GR the letter x indicates that the preceding syllable is repeated (shieh.x = shieh.shieh, "thank you"), vx being used when the preceding two syllables are repeated (haoshuo vx! = haoshuo haoshuo! "you're too kind!").

This concise but completely unphonetic, and hence unintuitive, device appears in Chao's Mandarin Primer and all W. Simon's texts (including his Chinese-English Dictionary). Eventually, however, it was silently discarded even by its inventor: in Chao's Grammar as well as his Sayable Chinese all reduplicated syllables are written out in full in their GR transcription.

== Exceptions ==
The following words and characters do not follow the rules of GR:

- The name Romatzyh (which strictly speaking should be "Luomaatzyh") follows international usage (Roma).
- The characters 一 ("one"), 七 ("seven"), 八 ("eight"), and 不 ("no/not") are always written i, chi, ba, and bu, respectively, regardless of the tone in which they are pronounced. In other words changes due to tone sandhi are not reflected in GR.
