= Sichuanese dialects =

Branch of the Mandarin Chinese language family

Sichuanese
- Szechwanese; Ssuchuanese
- 四川话
- Pronunciation: Chengdu [sz˨˩˧tsʰwan˦˥xwa˨˩˧] Chongqing [sz˨˩˦tsʰwan˥xwa˨˩˦]
- Native to: China
- Region: Sichuan, Chongqing and their neighboring provinces
- Ethnicity: Sichuanese people
- Language family: Sino-Tibetan: Sinitic; Chinese; Mandarin; Southwestern Mandarin; Sichuanese
- Dialects: Chengdu–Chongqing; Minjiang • Leshan; Renshou–Fushun dialect • Zigong; Ya'an–Shimian

Language codes
- ISO 639-3: (a proposal to use scm was rejected in 2018)
- Glottolog: None
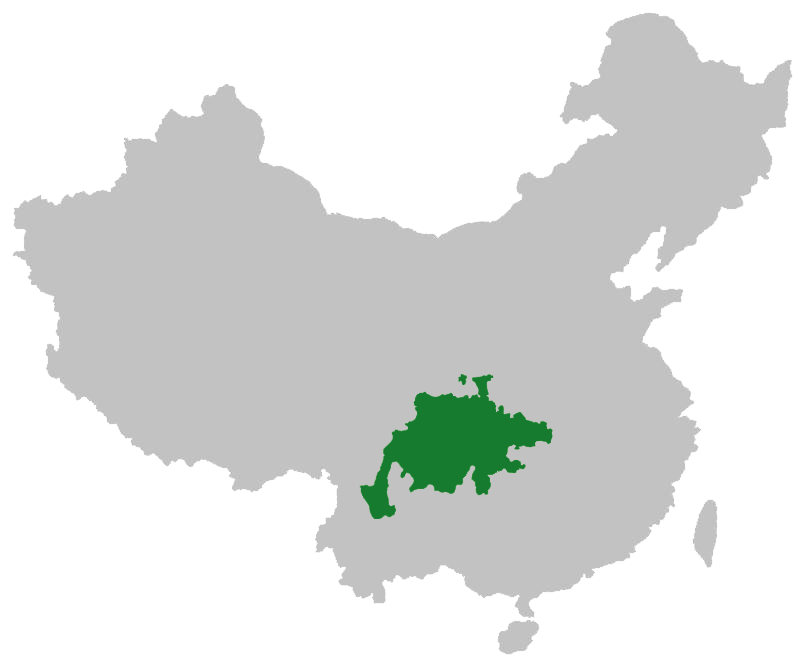
- Sichuanese in Greater China

Sichuanese, (Note: simplified Chinese: 四川话; traditional Chinese: 四川話; Sichuanese Pinyin: Si^{4}cuan^{1}hua^{4}; pinyin: Sìchuānhuà; Wade–Giles: Szŭ⁴-ch'uan¹-hua⁴) also called Sichuanese Mandarin, (Note: simplified Chinese: 四川官话; traditional Chinese: 四川官話; pinyin: Sìchuān Guānhuà) is a branch of Southwestern Mandarin spoken mainly in Sichuan and Chongqing, which was part of Sichuan Province from 1954 until 1997, and the adjacent regions of their neighboring provinces, such as Hubei, Guizhou, Yunnan, Hunan and Shaanxi. Although "Sichuanese" is often synonymous with the Chengdu-Chongqing dialect, there is still a great amount of diversity among the Sichuanese dialects, some of which are mutually unintelligible with one another and with other Mandarin varieties. In addition, because Sichuanese is the lingua franca in Sichuan, Chongqing and part of Tibet, it is also used by many Tibetan, Yi, Qiang and other ethnic minority groups as a second language.

Sichuanese is more similar to Standard Chinese than southeastern Chinese varieties but is still quite divergent in phonology, vocabulary, and even grammar. The Minjiang dialect is especially difficult for speakers of other Mandarin dialects to understand. Sichuanese can be further divided into a number of dialects: Chengdu–Chongqing, Minjiang, Renshou–Fushun, and Ya'an–Shimian. The dialect of Chengdu, the capital of Sichuan province and an important central city, is the most representative dialect of Southwestern Mandarin and is used widely in Sichuan opera and other art forms of the region.

Modern Sichuanese evolved due to a great wave of immigration during the Ming dynasty (1368–1644): many immigrants, mainly from Hunan, Hubei, Jiangxi and Guangdong, flooded into Sichuan bringing their languages with them. The influence of Sichuanese has resulted in a distinct form of Standard Chinese that is often confused with "real" Sichuanese. Sichuanese, spoken by about 120 million people, would rank tenth among languages by number of speakers (just behind Japanese) if counted as a separate language.

== Geographic distribution and dialects ==
Sichuanese is mainly spoken in and around the Sichuan Basin, which includes almost all of Sichuan Province and Chongqing Municipality except for some Tibetan- and Yi-inhabited areas. It is also spoken in the border regions of Sichuan's neighboring provinces: northern Yunnan and Guizhou, southern Shaanxi and western Hubei.

However, it is possible to divide Sichuanese into four sub-dialects according to the preservation or distribution of the Middle Chinese checked tone: the Minjiang dialect (岷江小片), which preserves the checked tone; the Chengdu-Chongqing dialect (成渝片), in which the checked tone has merged into the light level tone; the Renshou-Fushun dialect (仁富小片), which merges the checked tone into the departing tone; and the Ya'an–Shimian dialect (雅棉小片), in which the checked tone is merged into the dark level tone.

The Minjiang, Ya'an–Shimian, and Renshou–Fushun dialects are spoken mainly in South and West Sichuan, regions whose inhabitants have significantly more indigenous Sichuanese descent than those of North and East Sichuan. Thus, these dialects are often referred as Old Sichuanese, as the preserve many characteristics of Bashu, the extinct language formerly spoken by the first Sichuanese Han Chinese people. The Chengdu-Chongqing dialect, named after the two largest cities in greater Sichuan, are spoken in a contiguous area mainly in North and East Sichuan. It is often referred as New Sichuanese because it exhibits fewer characteristics of the Bashu language.

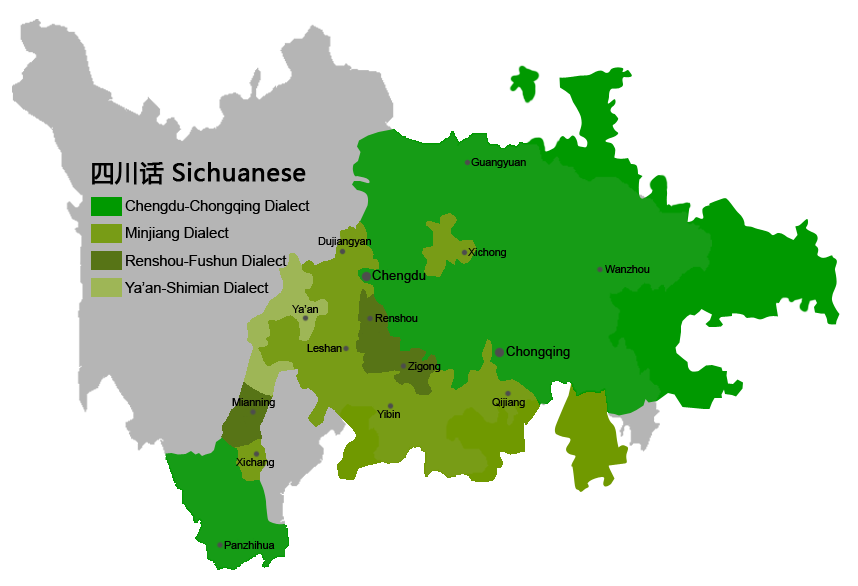
map showing locations of Sichuanese dialects

Name	Characteristics	Spoken areas
Chengdu–Chongqing dialect	entering tone distributed into light level tone	North and East Sichuan, the northeastern part of Chengdu Plain, several cities or counties in southwestern Sichuan (Panzhihua, Dechang, Yanyuan, Huili and Ningnan), Southern Shaanxi and Western Hubei
Minjiang dialect	entering tone preserved	44 cities or counties in Minjiang River valley or along the Yangtze River in South and West Sichuan, Xichang, Xichong, Yanting, Shehong, northern Yunnan and northern Guizhou
Renshou–Fushun dialect	entering tone distributed into departing tone	8 cities or counties in Tuo River valley (Renshou, Jingyan, Weiyuan, Zigong, Rongxian, Fushun, Neijiang and Longchang), Junlian and Mianning
Ya'an–Shimian dialect	entering tone distributed into dark level tone	Ya'an (prefecture-level city) in West Sichuan

== History ==
Like many of the southern provinces in China, Sichuan was fully sinicized by the end of the Tang dynasty. The modern variety of Chinese spoken in the region formed relatively recently. In the thirteenth century, the population of Sichuan dropped precipitously, suspected to be due in part to a series of plagues and Mongol invasions. The population did not recover until it was replenished by subsequent migrations from Hubei, as well as Xiang-, Gan- and Hakka-speakers in the following centuries. These varieties largely supplanted the earlier varieties of Chinese in Sichuan, known as Ba–Shu Chinese or Old Sichuanese. Like Min Chinese, Ba-Shu Chinese was different from the Middle Chinese of the Sui, Tang, and Song dynasties but was instead a divergent dialect group independently descended from the Old Chinese of the Han dynasty, which formed a substratum that influenced the formation of the modern dialect group. That helps to explain the distinctiveness of Modern Sichuanese within the Mandarin dialect continuum.

== Phonology ==
=== Tones ===
There are five phonemic tones in Sichuanese: dark level tone, light level tone, rising tone, departing tone and entering tone (or checked tone). In some regions the checked tone of Sichuanese has been merged into another tone, which is very different from standard Mandarin, whose checked tone has been merged irregularly into the other four tones. According to Phonology of Sichuan dialect (四川方言音系), among all the 150 Sichuanese-speaking cities and counties, 48 keep the checked tone while the other 102 have only four tones. Particularly, in some sub-dialects of the Minjiang dialect (such as the Yingjing dialect), the departing tone has developed into two different tones: a colloquial tone (which is similar to the second tone as a characteristic of Ba-Shu: 平声似去) and a literary tone (which is the same as the Chengdu dialect).

The tone contours of the Sichuanese dialects are highly and quite different from those of Beijing Mandarin. In Sichuanese, the first tone (dark level tone) is a high level tone (like Beijing), the second tone (light level tone) is a low falling tone (the mirror image of Beijing), the third tone (rising tone) is a high falling tone and the fourth tone (departing tone) is a low or mid rising tone (interchanged compared to Beijing) and the fifth tone (entering tone) is mid or high if it is not merged, as shown in the chart below.

Sub-dialects	1st tone	2nd tone	3rd tone	4th tone	5th tone
Chengdu	˥ 55 ˦˥ 45	˨˩ 21	˥˧ 53	˨˩˧ 213	merged into the 2nd ˨˩
Chongqing	˥ 55	˨˩ 21	˦˨ 42	˨˩˦ 214	merged into the 2nd ˨˩
Leshan	˥ 55	˨˩ 21	˥˨ 52	˨˨˦ 224	˧ 3 (checked)
Yingjing	˥ 45	˩˨˩ 121	˥˧ 53	˩ 11 (colloquial) ˨˩˧ 213 (literary)	˧ 33
Luzhou	˥ 55	˨˩ 21	˦˨ 42	˩˧ 13	˧ 33
Ya'an	˥ 55	˨˩ 21	˦˨ 42	˩˦ 14	merged into the 1st ˥
Zigong	˥ 55	˧˩ 31	˥˧ 53	˨˦ 24	merged into the 4th ˨˦

In the areas which keep the entering tone, the five tones of Sichuanese are nearly identical to the values of 5 of the 6 tones of the indigenous Southern Qiang language.

==== Tone Sandhi ====
Tone sandhi is common in Sichuanese, though the specifics differ between areas. For the Chengdu-Chongqing dialect, generally tone sandhi is split into 4 categories.

The first type involves reduplicated words: generally, if the constituent characters have a light level tone (2nd tone) or departing tone (4th tone), the second character changes to the dark level tone (1st tone). Examples: (爸爸[pa^{2}pa^{1}], 婆婆[pʰo^{2}pʰo^{1}], 舅舅[tɕiəu^{4}tɕiəu^{1}], 帕帕[pʰa^{4}pʰa^{1}]). If the constituent characters have a rising tone (3rd tone), the second character changes to the light level tone. Examples:(姐姐[tɕiai^{3}tɕiai^{2}], 板板[pan^{3}pan^{2}]).

The second type involves words ending in 兒 (i.e. Erization). If there is one character before the 兒 and it has the 2nd tone, the 兒 character changes to the 1st tone. Examples: (娃儿[ua^{2}ɚ^{1}], 瓢儿[pʰiau^{2}ɚ^{1}]). If there is a two-character compound before the 兒, the character before the 兒 changes into the 1st tone. Examples: (葡萄_{儿}[pʰu^{2}tʰɚ^{1}], 麻雀_{儿}[ma^{2}tɕʰyɚ^{1}]).

The third type involves specific characters. For example, function word characters like 去, 頭, 面, 上 change into the 1st tone in most of the cases. Examples: (上去[saŋ^{4}tɕʰe^{1}], 屋头[vu^{2}tʰəu^{1}], 外面[uai^{4}mian^{1}], 身上[sen^{1}saŋ^{1}).

The fourth type involves two-character compounds and three-character compounds. In many cases, the 2nd character's tone changes into the 1st tone. Examples: (姑娘[ku^{2}niaŋ^{1}], 经佑[tɕin^{1}iəu^{1}], 院坝[yuən^{4}pa^{1}], 龙门阵[noŋ^{2}mən^{1}tsən^{4}], 明年子[min^{2}nʲian^{1}tsɿ^{3}]).

=== Initials ===
Initials (or syllable onsets) are initial consonants of possible syllables. There are 21 initials in the Chengdu dialect of Sichuanese (academically referred as Standard Sichuanese). Four Sichuanese initial consonants do not exist in Beijing: [z], [v], [ŋ] and [nʲ]. On the other hand, five initials in Beijing do not exist in Sichuanese: [tʂ], [tʂʰ], [ʂ], [ʐ] and [l].

The following is the initial consonant inventory of Sichuanese, transcribed in the International Phonetic Alphabet, and under every IPA symbol in the inventory below there is the transcription of that sound in Sichuanese Pinyin and a Chinese character using that initial:

		Labial	Coronal	Alveolo-palatal	Velar
Plosive	plain	/p/ b 贝	/t/ d 得		/k/ g 古
Plosive	aspirated	/pʰ/ p 配	/tʰ/ t 套		/kʰ/ k 可
Affricate	plain		/ts/ z 早	/tɕ/ j 价	
Affricate	aspirated		/tsʰ/ c 草	/tɕʰ/ q 巧	
Nasal		/m/ m 没	/n/ n 路	/ɲ/ ȵ 你	/ŋ/ ng 我
Fricative	Voiceless	/f/ f 发	/s/ s 是	/ɕ/ x 小	/x/ h 好
Fricative	Voiced	/v/ v 五	/z/ r 如		
Zero		∅ 儿			

=== Finals ===
A final, the remainder of syllable after the initial, consists of an optional medial glide, a vowel and an optional final consonants. There are 36 finals in the Chengdu dialect of Sichuanese. Four Sichuanese finals do not exist in Beijing: [ɛ], [iai], [uɛ], and [yo]. On the other hand, three Beijing finals do not exist in Sichuanese: [ɤ], [iŋ], and [əŋ].

The following is the inventory of Sichuanese finals, transcribed in the International Phonetic Alphabet, and under every IPA symbol in the inventory below there is the standard orthography of that sound in Sichuanese Pinyin and a Chinese character using that final:

	-Ø					-i or -u				nasal finals			
Ø-	/z̩/ i 日	/ɚ/ er 二	/a/ a 大	/o/ o 我	/ɛ/ e 黑	/ai/ ai 街	/ei/ ei 批	/au/ ao 包	/əu/ ou 走	/an/ an 烦	/ən/ en 樱	/aŋ/ ang 帮	/oŋ/ ong 亩
i-	/i/ i 一		/ia/ ia 牙		/iɛ/ ie 叶	/iai/ iai 介		/iau/ iao 标	/iəu/ iu 九	/ian/ ian 变	/in/ in 兵	/iaŋ/ iang 量	
u-	/u/ u 五		/ua/ ua 瓜		/uɛ/ ue 国	/uai/ uai 乖	/uei/ ui 类			/uan/ uan 段	/uən/ un 春	/uaŋ/ uang 光	
y-	/y/ ü 鱼			/yo/ üo 药	/ye/ üe 绝					/yan/ üan 鲜	/yn/ ün 泳		/yoŋ/ iong 蓉

==== Tense vowels for checked tone ====
There is a discrepancy between Old Sichuanese and New Sichuanese in terms of finals. In the "old" Minjiang dialect, the stop consonants for checked-tone syllables in Middle Chinese have developed into tense vowels to create a phonemic contrast, and in several cities and counties the tense vowels are followed by a glottal stop to emphasize the contrast. Meanwhile, the checked tone has disappeared in other Sichuanese dialects. The following table shows the tense vowels of Minjiang dialect's three sub-dialects, spoken in Luzhou, Qionglai and Leshan, and a comparison with other Sichuanese dialects is also presented.

example	Minjiang			Ya'an–Shimian	Chengdu-Chongqing		Renshou–Fushun
example	Luzhou	Qionglai	Leshan	Luding	Chengdu	Chongqing	Zigong
搭	[æ]	[æ]	[æ]	[a]	[a]	[a]	[a]
说	[ɵ]	[ʊ]	[ʊ]	[o]	[o]	[o]	[o]
黑	[e]	[æ]	[e]	[ɛ]	[ɛ]	[ɛ]	[ɛ]
踢	[ie]	[ie]	[ie]	[i]	[iɛ]	[i]	[i]
出	[ɵ]	[ʊ]	[ʊ]	[u]	[u]	[u]	[u]
欲	[yɵ]	[yʊ]	[yʊ]	[y]	[yo]	[yu]	[yi]
湿	[ə]	[ə]	[ə]	[z̩]	[z̩]	[z̩]	[z̩]
掐	[iæ]	[iɐ]	[iæ]	[ia]	[ia]	[ia]	[ia]
刮	[uæ]	[uɐ]	[uæ]	[ua]	[ua]	[ua]	[ua]
铁	[ie]	[ie]	[ie]	[iɛ]	[iɛ]	[iɛ]	[iɛ]
获	[ɵ]	[uæ]	[æ]	[uɛ]	[uɛ]	[uɛ]	[ue]
阅	[yɵ]	[ye]	[yʊ]	[yɛ]	[yɛ]	[yɛ]	[yɛ]
药	[yɵ]	[yʊ]	[yʊ]	[yo]	[yo]	[yo]	[yo]

=== Literary and colloquial readings ===
The existence of literary and colloquial readings (文白异读), is a notable feature in Sichuanese and some other Sinitic varieties, such as Cantonese or Hokkien. In Sichuanese, colloquial readings tend to resemble Ba-Shu Chinese (Old Sichuanese) or Southern Old Mandarin, while literary readings tend to resemble modern standard Mandarin. For example, in the Yaoling dialect (摇铃话), the colloquial reading of "物" (means "things") is [væʔ], which is very similar to its pronunciation of Ba-Shu Chinese in the Song dynasty (960–1279). Meanwhile, its literary reading, [voʔ], is relatively similar to the standard Mandarin pronunciation [wu]. The table below shows some examples of Chinese characters with both literary and colloquial readings in Sichuanese.

Example	Colloquial Reading	Literary Reading	Meaning	Standard Mandarin Pronunciation
在	/tɛ˨˩˧/	/tsai˨˩˧/	at	/tsai˥˩/
提	/tia˥/	/tʰi˨˩/	lift	/tʰi˧˥/
去	/tɕʰie˨˩˧/	/tɕʰy˨˩˧/	go	/tɕʰy˥˩/
锯	/kɛ/	/tɕy˨˩˧/	cut	/tɕy˥˩/
下	/xa˨˩˧/	/ɕia˨˩˧/	down	/ɕia˥˩/
横	/xuan˨˩/	/xuən˨˩/	across	/xəŋ˧˥/
严	/ŋan/	/ȵian/	strict	/iɛn˧˥/
鼠	/suei/	/su˥˧/	rat	/ʂu˨˩˦/
大	/tʰai/	/ta˨˩˧/	big	/ta˥˩/
主	/toŋ/	/tsu˥˧/	master	/tʂu˨˩˦/

== Vocabulary ==
Only 47.8% of Sichuanese vocabulary is in common with the Beijing dialect on which Standard Chinese is based; indeed Sichuanese shares more vocabulary with the Xiang and Gan varieties of Chinese, even though Sichuanese is usually classified as a dialect of Mandarin.

The vocabulary of Sichuanese has three main origins: Ba-Shu (or Ancient Sichuanese), Middle Chinese and the languages of the immigrants, including Proto-Mandarin from Hubei, Xiang, Gan and Hakka, which were brought to Sichuan during the Ming and Qing dynasties. Recently, many loanwords have been introduced to Sichuanese from standard Mandarin and English. Meanwhile, new Sichuanese words are developing in large cities, such as Chengdu and Chongqing, which then spread at a dramatic speed through Sichuan. "雄起" (xiong^{2}qi^{3}) (meaning "to cheer someone on") is a typical example of a novel Sichuanese word, equivalent to "加油" (jiāyóu) in standard Mandarin. "耙耳朵" (Pá ěr duo) is a word exclusive to Sichuanese, which means "henpecked husbands". A standard Mandarin equivalent of "耙耳朵" is "妻管严" (qī guǎn yán). The prototype of "耙耳朵" comes from a kind of bicycle with "ears" in Chengdu, which was first invented by men in Chengdu in order to make their wives sit more comfortably. There are still a few such bikes on streets of Chengdu.

Common Vocabulary difference
Sichuanese Dialect	Standard Chinese	Sichuanese Dialect	Standard Chinese
歪(waī)	凶恶(xīong è)	巴(bā)	粘贴(zhān tiē)
左(zuǒ)	跑音(pǎo yīn)	费(feì)	调皮(tíao pí)
撵(nǐan)	追赶(zhuī gǎn)	刨(páo)	拨弄(bō nòng)
号(hào)	批阅(pī yuè)	摸(mō)	拖延(tuō yán)
巴适(bā shì)	好(hǎo)	盐巴(yán bá)	盐(yán)
瓢羹(píao gēng)	勺(sháo)	𤆵和(pā huó)	软(ruǎn)
嘎嘎(ga ga)	肉(roù)	几下(jǐ xià)	快(kuaì)
估到(gū dào)	逼(bī)	啪啦(pā lā)	堆(duī)

=== Relation with other Chinese languages ===
The Chengdu dialect is usually taken as a representative of Sichuanese. Sichuanese shares the most similar vocabulary with Yunnanese, a dialect of Southwestern Mandarin spoken in the neighboring province. However, the relationship between Sichuanese and Northern Mandarin dialects, including the standard language, is weaker than the relationship between Xiang and Gan.

In terms of vocabulary, Sichuanese has the second closest relationship with Xiang. The two varieties share a large number of exclusively unique words. This is mainly because many Xiang-speaking immigrants from Hunan moved to Sichuan during the great wave of immigration during the Ming and Qing dynasties, so Xiang does not have such a close relationship with other southwestern varieties of Chinese, such as those spoken in Yunnan, Guangxi or Hubei. For example, in both Sichuanese and Xiang the verb "to squat" is "跍" (gu^{1}) but "蹲" (dūn) in standard Mandarin, the noun "kitchen" is "灶屋" (zao^{4}vu^{2}) but "厨房" (chúfáng) in standard, and the adjective "thick" is "酽" (ȵian^{4}) but "浓" (nóng) in standard. Furthermore, the Sichuanese vocabulary also contains words from Old Xiang and Middle Xiang, such as "謱謰" (sloppy), "革" (old) and "崽" (son).

Rank of lexical similarity between Sichuanese and other Chinese languages
Rank	Chinese languages	Major dialect	Percentage of the same vocabulary with Sichuanese
1	Southwestern Mandarin-Yunnanese	Kunming	58.3%
2	Xiang	Changsha	54.9%
3	Jianghuai Mandarin	Yangzhou	52.7%
4	Gan	Nanchang	49.4%
5	Northern Mandarin	Beijing	47.8%
6	Wu	Suzhou	36.4%
7	Yue	Guangzhou	27.4%
8	Hakka	Meixian	27.2%
9	Min	Xiamen	20.2%

== Status ==
Though Sichuanese is not as endangered as some other languages of China, the prevalence of Sichuanese has dramatically lessened as the popularity of Mandarin Chinese has risen. Government policy limits the use of Sichuanese in broadcasting, television and many public places. Furthermore, the use of Sichuanese as a teaching medium is not permitted in the curriculum, which has resulted in a reduction of fluency among young people in Sichuanese-speaking areas since the 1980s and 1990s. The Sichuanese spoken by them is greatly influenced by the national language.

The decline of Sichuanese threatens to severely impact Ba-Shu culture, rooted in the Sichuanese dialect, particularly traditional Shu arts such as Sichuan opera, which risk severe decline or even extinction. China enacted laws in 2000 mandating the use of Mandarin. Provinces, including Sichuan, established language committees to advise, monitor, and enforce Mandarin usage. The mandate inevitably caused massive decline in audience members and the performance of traditional Ba-shu folk art.

== See also ==
- Ba–Shu culture
