= Rhotic =

Rhotic is a term in linguistics derived from the Greek letter Rho which may refer to:

- Rhotic consonant, liquid consonants such as the [ɹ] sound in red
- R-colored vowel, a vowel that is modified in a way that lowers the third formant, such as the [ɝ] sound in Midwestern American English pronunciation of fur
  - Erhua (simplified Chinese: 儿化; traditional Chinese: 兒化; pinyin: érhuà), a phonological process that, in Standard Chinese and other Sinitic languages, adds R-coloring to the final of a syllable
- Rhoticity in English, the quality of an accent of English allowing syllable-final /r/

== See also ==
- Rhotacism (disambiguation)
