= Szechuan sauce =

Szechuan sauce, from alternate romanization of Sichuan, may refer to:

- Szechuan sauce (McDonald's), a dipping sauce from the McDonald's fast-food chain
- Schezwan chutney, a chutney (condiment) in Indian Chinese cuisine
- Sichuan cuisine, the culinary tradition from Sichuan

== See also ==
- Sichuanese (disambiguation)
