= Rhotacism (disambiguation) =

Rhotacism or rhoticism can refer to:

- Rhotacism (speech impediment), difficulty in pronouncing the /r/ sound
- Rhotacism (sound change), the historical sound change of another sound to /r/

== See also ==
- Rhotic (disambiguation)
