= Sichuanese Standard Chinese =

Dialect of Standard Mandarin

Sichuanese Standard Mandarin
- 四川普通话
- Native to: China
- Region: Sichuan and Chongqing
- Native speakers: None
- Language family: Sino-Tibetan: Sinitic; Chinese; Mandarin; Beijing Mandarin; Beijingese; Standard Mandarin; Sichuanese Standard Mandarin

Language codes
- ISO 639-3: –
- Glottolog: None

Sichuanese Standard Mandarin (simplified Chinese: 四川普通话; traditional Chinese: 四川普通話; Sichuanese Pinyin: Si^{4}cuan^{1} Pu^{3}tong^{1}hua^{4}; pinyin: Sìchuān Pǔtōnghuà; Wade–Giles: Szŭ^{4}-ch'uan^{1} P'u^{3}-t'ung^{1}-hua^{4}), or Szechwanese/Szuchuanese Standard Mandarin, also known as Pepper Salt Standard Mandarin (simplified Chinese: 椒盐普通话; traditional Chinese: 椒鹽普通話), is a variant of Standard Mandarin derived from the official Standard Mandarin spoken in Sichuanese-speaking areas (mainly Sichuan and Chongqing) in China, and is often called "川普" (Chuan^{1}pu^{3}, Chuānpǔ or Ch'uan^{1}-p'u^{3}) for short.

Unlike Sichuanese (or Sichuanese Mandarin), which is a native language spoken in the Sichuan region and differs greatly from Standard Mandarin, Sichuanese Standard Mandarin (or Chuanpu) arose after the Popularize Mandarin Policy was implemented by the Chinese government in 1956 and is in fact Standard Mandarin with a Sichuanese accent and some elements of Sichuanese vocabulary and grammar. In this view, Chuanpu is, to a certain degree, similar to Taiwanese Mandarin and Singaporean Mandarin, which are influenced by Hokkien and other varieties.

== Usage ==
Chuanpu is spoken by Sichuanese people who are required to communicate with people from outside of Sichuan and Chongqing, but who cannot speak authentic Standard Mandarin. Chuanpu is also often used humorously among local people who find it funny. Due to its humorous effect, Chuanpu is occasionally used in local television, broadcasting and popular music, with good results. Chuanpu Waichang (川普歪唱), the music sung in Chuanpu, is very popular in Sichuan and Chongqing and is usually adapted from famous songs.
