= Kunming dialect =

Southwestern Mandarin Chinese dialect

- Native to: China
- Region: Yunnan
- Language family: Sino-Tibetan: Sinitic; Chinese; Mandarin; Southwestern; Kunming dialect

Language codes
- ISO 639-3: –
- Glottolog: kunm1234

The Kunming dialect (simplified Chinese: 昆明话; traditional Chinese: 昆明話; pinyin: Kūnmínghuà) is a dialect of Southwestern Mandarin Chinese. Luo Changpei describes it as having "simple phonemes, elegant vocabulary, and clear grammar."

== Beginnings ==
The beginnings of the Kunming dialect are closely linked with the migration of the Han Chinese to Yunnan. The differences between "old" Kunming dialect and the "new" dialect began in the 1940s. In the aftermath of the Second Sino-Japanese War, large numbers of refugees from the north of China and the Jiangnan region fled to Kunming, with profound effects for the politics, economy and culture of the city. This large influx of outsiders also had an influence on the local dialect, which slowly developed into the "new" Kunming dialect.

== Learning ==
The tones, pronunciation, and lexicon are distinct between Northern Mandarin and Kunming dialect.
