= Erhua =

R-coloring in Mandarin Chinese syllables

- Traditional Chinese: 兒化
- Simplified Chinese: 儿化
Transcriptions
Standard Mandarin
- Hanyu Pinyin: érhuà
- Bopomofo: ㄦˊ ㄏㄨㄚˋ
- Wade–Giles: erh^{2}-hua^{4}
- IPA: [ǎɚ.xwâ]
Wu
- Romanization: ^{6}ng-ho
Yue: Cantonese
- Yale Romanization: yìhfa
- Jyutping: ji4 faa3
- IPA: [ji˩.fa˧]

Erhua (simplified Chinese: 儿化; traditional Chinese: 兒化; pinyin: érhuà), also called "erization" or "rhotacization of syllable finals", is a phonological process that adds r-coloring or the er (儿; 兒 [ɚ]) sound to syllables in spoken Mandarin Chinese. Erhuayin (儿化音; 兒化音) is the pronunciation of "er" after rhotacization of syllable finals.

It is common in most varieties of Mandarin as a diminutive suffix for nouns, though some dialects also use it for other grammatical purposes. The Standard Chinese spoken in government-produced educational and examination recordings features erhua to some extent, as in 哪儿 nǎr 'where', 一点儿 yìdiǎnr 'a little', and 好玩儿 hǎowánr 'fun'. Colloquial speech in many dialects, especially in northern China, has more extensive erhua than the standardized language. Southwestern Mandarin dialects, such as those of Chongqing and Chengdu, also have erhua. By contrast, many southern Chinese, such as in Fujian and Guangdong, who speak their own languages, may have difficulty pronouncing the sound or may simply prefer not to pronounce it, and usually avoid words with erhua when speaking Standard Chinese. For example, the three examples listed above may be replaced with the synonyms 哪里 nǎlǐ, 一点 yìdiǎn, 好玩 hǎowán. Furthermore, erhua is extremely rare or absent in Mandarin speakers from diaspora communities such as those from Singapore and Taiwan.

Only a small number of words in standardized Mandarin, such as 二 èr 'two' and 耳 ěr 'ear' have r-colored vowels that do not result from the erhua process. All of the non-erhua r-colored syllables have no initial consonant, and they are traditionally pronounced [ɚ] in the Beijing dialect and other conservative varieties. In recent decades, the vowel in the toned syllable er, especially èr, has been lowered in many accents, making the syllable come to approach or acquire a quality like ar—i.e. [äʵ]~[ɐʵ] with the appropriate tone.

In some publications, particularly those on Chinese linguistics, the 儿; 兒 in terms with erhua is written with a smaller size to distinguish its non-syllabic nature. This also distinguishes it from the same character being used as a noun meaning 'son'. This practice may have been introduced by Yuen Ren Chao. The small-sized simplified and traditional forms of the character were added to Unicode in version 17.0, and are encoded as U+16FF2 𖿲 CHINESE SMALL SIMPLIFIED ER and U+16FF3 𖿳 CHINESE SMALL TRADITIONAL ER in the Ideographic Symbols and Punctuation block.

== Standard rules ==
The basic rules controlling the surface pronunciation of erhua are as follows:

- Coda
  - /i/ and /n/ are deleted.
  - /ŋ/ is deleted and the syllable becomes nasalized.
  - /u/ becomes rhotacized.
- Nucleus
  - [ɛ] becomes [ɐ] if it is an underlying /a/.
  - /ə/ and /u/ become rhotacized.
  - /i/ and /y/ become glides ([j] and [ɥ]).
  - [ɹ̩~ɻ̩] is deleted.

Following the rules that coda [i] and [n] are deleted, noted above, the finals in the syllables 伴儿 (bànr) 盖儿 (gàir) are both [ɐʵ]; similarly, the finals in the syllables 妹儿 (mèir) and 份儿 (fènr) are both also [ɚ]. The final in 趟儿 (tàngr) is similar but nasalized, because of the rule that the [ŋ] is deleted and the syllable is nasalized.

The realization of ar, i.e. the erhua of coda-less a, varies. It may be realized as [äʵ], distinct from anr and air, or it may be merged with the latter two. That is, a word like 把儿 bàr may be realized with either [äʵ] or [ɐʵ] depending on the speaker.

Because of the rule that [i] and [y] become glides, the finals of 气儿 (qìr) and 劲儿 (jìnr) are both [jɚ], and 裙儿 qúnr and 驴儿 lǘr are both [ɥɚ].

The following chart shows how the finals are affected by the addition of this suffix:

IPA and pinyin counterparts of bopomofo finals
	∅	ㄚ; a	ㄛ; o	ㄜ; e	ㄝ; ê	ㄞ; ai	ㄟ; ei	ㄠ; ao	ㄡ; ou	ㄢ; an	ㄣ; en	ㄤ; ang	ㄥ; eng
∅	[ɚ]; (ㄭ)ㄦ^{1}; -ir	[äʵ]~[ɐʵ]; ㄚㄦ; ar; -ar	[ɔʵ]; ㄛㄦ; or; -or	[ɤʵ]; ㄜㄦ; e'r; -er	—	[ɐʵ]; ㄞㄦ; air; -air	[ɚ]; ㄟㄦ; eir; -eir	[ɑu̯˞]; ㄠㄦ; aor; -aor	[ou̯˞]; ㄡㄦ; our; -our	[ɐʵ]; ㄢㄦ; anr; -anr	[ɚ]; ㄣㄦ; enr; -enr	[ɑ̃ʵ]; ㄤㄦ; angr; -angr	[ɤ̃ʵ]; ㄥㄦ; engr; -engr
ㄧ; i	[jɚ]; ㄧㄦ; yir; -ir	[jäʵ]~[jɐʵ]; ㄧㄚㄦ; yar; -iar	—		[jɛʵ]; ㄧㄝㄦ; yer; -ier	—		[jɑu̯ʵ]; ㄧㄠㄦ; yaor; -iaor	[jou̯ʵ]; ㄧㄡㄦ; your; -iur	[jɐʵ]; ㄧㄢㄦ; yanr; -ianr	[jɚ]; ㄧㄣㄦ; yinr; -inr	[jɑ̃ʵ]; ㄧㄤㄦ; yangr; -iangr	[jɤ̃ʵ]; ㄧㄥㄦ; yingr; -ingr
ㄨ; u	[u˞]; ㄨㄦ; wur; -ur	[wäʵ]~[wɐʵ]; ㄨㄚㄦ; war; -uar	[wɔʵ]; ㄨㄛㄦ; wor; -uor	—		[wɐʵ]; ㄨㄞㄦ; wair; -uair	[wɚ]; ㄨㄟㄦ; weir; -uir	—		[wɐʵ]; ㄨㄢㄦ; wanr; -uanr	[wɚ]; ㄨㄣㄦ; wenr; -unr	[wɑ̃ʵ]; ㄨㄤㄦ; wangr; -uangr	[wɤ̃ʵ], [ʊ̃˞]; ㄨㄥㄦ; wengr; -ongr
ㄩ; ü	[ɥɚ]; ㄩㄦ; yur; -ür	—			[ɥœʵ]; ㄩㄝㄦ; yuer; -üer	—				[ɥɐʵ]; ㄩㄢㄦ; yuanr; -üanr	[ɥɚ]; ㄩㄣㄦ; yunr; -ünr	—N/a	[jʊ̃ʵ]; ㄩㄥㄦ; yongr; -iongr

=== Examples ===
- 一瓶 (yìpíng, one bottle) → 一瓶儿 (yìpíngr), pronounced [i˥˩pʰjɤ̃ʵ˧˥]
- 公园 (gōngyuán, public garden) → 公园儿 (gōngyuánr), pronounced [kʊŋ˥ɥɐʵ˧˥]
- 小孩 (xiǎohái, small child) → 小孩儿 (xiǎoháir), pronounced [ɕjau̯˨˩xɐʵ˧˥]
- 事 (shì) (thing) → 事儿 (shìr), pronounced [ʂɚ˥˩]

== Beijing dialect ==
Aside from its use as a diminutive, erhua in the Beijing dialect also serves to differentiate words; for example, 白面 báimiàn 'flour' and 白面儿 báimiànr 'heroin'. Additionally, some words may sound unnatural without rhotacization, as is the case with 花 or 花儿 (huā or huār 'flower'). In these cases, the erhua serves to label the word as a noun (and sometimes a specific noun among a group of homophones). Since in modern Mandarin many single-syllable words (in which there are both nouns and adjectives) share the same pronunciation, adding such a label on nouns can reduce the complication.

As an example, the syllable wǎn may mean one of 碗 'bowl', 婉 'gentleness', 挽 'to take with hand', 皖 (a short form of Anhui), 宛 (a place name and surname), and 晚 'late', 'night'. However, of these words, only 碗儿 wǎnr 'bowl', 'the little bowl' can generally have erhua. Further, many people erhua 晚, but only when it means 'night' and not 'late'. The rest never have erhua and erhua attempts will cause incomprehension.

Erhua does not always occur at the end of a word in Beijing dialect. Although it must occur at the end of the syllable, it can be added to the middle of many words, and there is not a rule to explain when it should be added to the middle. For example, 板儿砖 bǎnrzhuān 'brick' (especially a brick used as a weapon) should not be 板砖儿 bǎnzhuānr.

The composition of the erhua system varies within Beijing, with the following variations reported. Apart from sub-dialects, many sociological factors are involved, such as gender, age, ethnicity, inner/outer city, and North–South.

- Some merge -ar (nucleus a with no coda) with -anr/-air (nucleus a with coda -i/-n), as [ɐʵ], while others distinguish them as [äʵ] vs [ɐʵ].
- Some merge -er single e with erhua with -enr/-eir, as [əʵ]. This may depend on phonological environments, such as the tone and the preceding consonant.
- Some merge -ier and -üer with -ir/-inr and -ür/-ünr, as [jəʵ] [ɥəʵ].
- Some merge -uor with -uir/-unr, as [wəʵ].
- Some lose the nasalization of -ngr, thus potentially merging pairs like -ir/-ingr, -enr/-engr and -angr/-anr.

== In other Mandarin varieties ==
The realization and behavior of erhua are very different among Mandarin dialects. Tones are marked by the tone diacritics of the corresponding tone in Standard Chinese, and do not necessarily represent the actual realization of tones. Some rules mentioned before are still generally applied, such as the deletion of coda [i] and [n] and the nasalization with the coda [ŋ]. Certain vowels' qualities may also change. However, depending on the exact dialect, the actual behavior, rules and realization can differ greatly.

=== Chongqing and Chengdu ===
Erhua in Chengdu and Chongqing is collapsed to only one set: [ɚ] [jɚ] [wɚ] [ɥɚ], Many words become homophonous as a result, for example 板儿 bǎnr 'board' and 本儿 běnr 'booklet', both pronounced [pɚ] with the appropriate tone. It is technically feasible to write all erhua in Pinyin simply as -er.

Besides its diminutive and differentiating functions, erhua in these two dialects can also make the language more vivid. In Chongqing, erhua can also be derogatory.

Different from Beijing, erhua can be applied to people's names and kinship words, such as cáoyēr (diminutive of the name Cao Ying 曹英儿) and xiǎomèr 'little sister' (小妹儿).

Erhua occurs in more names of places, vegetables and little animals compared to Beijing.

Erhua causes sandhi for the reduplication of monosyllabic words. In both dialects, the application of erhua to a monosyllabic noun usually results in its reduplication, e.g. 盘 'dish' becomes 盘盘儿 pánpánr 'little dish'. The second syllable invariably has yángpíng (Chinese: 陽平) or the second tone.

In Chongqing, erhua causes sandhi in some bisyllabic reduplicative adverbs, where second syllable acquires yīnpíng (陰平) or the first tone.

=== Zhongyuan dialects ===
Some dialects of Zhongyuan Mandarin preserve the coda /ʔ/. They are typically deleted in erhua like with the codas /i/ and /n/.

Some dialects distinguish pairs like -ir/-inr and -ür/-ünr, making words like 鸡儿 jīr 'little chicken' and 今儿 jīnr 'today' different. For example, in Huojia, the former is /tɕiʵ/ while the latter is /tɕjəʵ/.

=== Nanjing dialect ===
Erhua causes the medial /i/ to be dropped and the shǎng (third) tone to assimilate to the yángpíng (second) tone, the original tone of the morpheme 儿.

The Nanking dialect preserves the checked syllable (pinyin: rùshēng) and thus possesses a coda /ʔ/. erhua checked syllables are realized with /-ɻʔ/.

=== Non-rhotic erhua ===
Many Mandarin dialects have a handful of words exhibiting a fossilized lexical form of nasal-coda erhua. An example is 鼻涕儿 bíting /pi2.tʰiŋ/ 'nasal mucus', cf. the etymon 鼻涕 bíti /pi2.tʰi/.

In the Malaysian Mandarin dialect, erhua is often pronounced as /ə/, due to the influence of southern Chinese dialects such as Cantonese and Hokkien.

== In other Chinese languages ==
=== Wu ===
Wu Chinese varieties exhibit a similar phenomenon with the morpheme 兒, generally pronounced /ŋ/. The erhua coda is almost always a nasal coda instead of a rhotic one. Some lects' erhua also causes vowel umlaut. The exception is Hangzhounese, which adds a er² /ɦəl/ final instead, which is phonotactically a rhotic.

For example, 麻將 (Shanghainese: mo-cian, 'Mahjong') is etymologically 麻雀兒 (mo-ciaq-ng 'little sparrow'), from 麻雀 (mo-ciaq, /mo.t͡si̯ɐʔ/ 'sparrow'). The syllable 雀 (ciaq, /t͡si̯ɐʔ/) undergoes erhua with the morpheme 兒 (ng, /ŋ̍/), resulting in the syllable cian /t͡si̯aŋ/, which is then represented by the homophonous but etymologically unrelated word 將 cian /t͡si̯aŋ/. Further examples include:

- Addition of rhotic coda (Examples from Hangzhounese)

- 鴨 iaq⁷ /iɑʔ⁵/ 'duck' → 鴨兒 iaq⁷-er² /iɑʔ⁵ əl³³/
- 知了 tsy¹-liau³ /tsz̩⁵³ liɔ⁵³/ 'cicada' → 知了兒 tsy¹-liau³-er² /tsz̩³³ liɔ⁵³ əl³¹/
- 小鬼頭 shiau³-kuei³-dei² /ɕiɔ⁵³ kui³¹ dei/ 'brat' → 小鬼頭兒 shiau³-kuei³-dei²-er² /ɕiɔ⁵³ kui³¹ dei əl/

- Addition of nasal coda (Examples from Wenzhounese)

- 地蟢 dei⁶-sy¹ /di¹¹ sz̩³³/ 'crab' → 地蟢兒 dei⁶-sy¹-ng² /di⁵³ sz̩¹¹ ŋ̍¹²/
- 棗 tseo³ /tsə³⁵/ 'jujube' → 棗兒 tseo³-ng² /tsə⁴² ŋ̍¹¹/

- Historical nasal coda resulting in umlaut (Examples from Shanghainese)

- 凌凙 lin⁶-doq⁸ /liŋ¹¹ doʔ³³/ 'icicle' → 凌凙兒 lin⁶-daon⁶ /liŋ¹¹ dɑ̃³³/ (often mistakenly written as 凌宕, though etymologically correct spelling supported by nearby lects.)
- 蝦 ho¹ /ho⁵³/ 'shrimp' → 蝦兒 hoe¹ /hø⁵³/

=== Yue ===
Yue languages such as Cantonese have a small number of terms with 兒 (ji⁴, /i²¹/) that exhibit tone change, such as the term 乞兒 (hat¹ ji⁴⁻¹, /hɐt⁵ i²¹⁻⁵/, 'beggar'). Cantonese also exhibits a diminutive formation known as changed tone (traditional Chinese: 變音; simplified Chinese: 变音; Jyutping: bin^{3} jam^{1}) by altering the base tone contour to that of the dark rising tone (陰上), such as the term 廣州話 (gwong² zau¹ waa⁶⁻², 'Cantonese'), which etymologically may be an erhua based construction.
