= Ba–Shu Chinese =

Extinct Sinitic language

- 巴蜀語
- Native to: China
- Region: Sichuan Basin
- Extinct: Ming dynasty era some features are preserved in Sichuanese Mandarin, especially the Minjiang dialect
- Language family: Sino-Tibetan: Sinitic; Chinese; Ba–Shu Chinese
- Early forms: Proto-Sino-Tibetan: Old Chinese
- Dialects: Minjiang?

Language codes
- ISO 639-3: None (mis)
- Glottolog: None

Ba–Shu Chinese (Chinese: 巴蜀語; pinyin: Bāshǔyǔ; Wade–Giles: Ba¹ Shu³ Yü³; Sichuanese Pinyin: Ba¹su²yu³; [pa˥su˨˩y˥˧]), or simply Shu Chinese (Chinese: 蜀語), also known as Old Sichuanese, is an extinct Chinese language formerly spoken in what is now Sichuan and Chongqing, China.

== History and influences ==
Ba–Shu Chinese was first described in the book Fangyan from the Western Han dynasty (206 BCE–8 CE) and represented one of the earliest splits from Old Chinese. Unlike most extant varieties of Chinese, which stem from Middle Chinese, Ba–Shu diverged directly from Old Chinese, a feature it shares only with Min Chinese. However, Ba–Shu represents an even earlier split, as Min did not begin to diverge from Old Chinese until the Eastern Han (25–220 CE) and Three Kingdoms period (220–280 CE).

Ba–Shu Chinese started to disappear during the late Southern Song dynasty period due to the Mongol conquest of China, which resulted in a massacre throughout the Sichuan Basin. The language was supplanted by Southwestern Mandarin after settlement by people from other parts of China, mostly from present-day Hubei and Hunan.

Phonological aspects of Ba–Shu Chinese are preserved in the Minjiang dialect of Sichuanese Mandarin, which caused debate on whether the dialect is a variant of Southwestern Mandarin or a modern-day descendant of Ba–Shu.

== Phonology ==
Although the Ba–Shu language is extinct, some phonology features of rhymes can be found by researching the local literati and poets' use of rhymes in their works. Liu Xiaonan (2014) assumed that they wrote verses in Standard Chinese of the Song dynasty, but because their mother tongue was Ba–Shu, their verses rhymed in the Ba–Shu accent.

=== Coda mergers ===
According to Liu's research, there is enough evidence to assume a significant number of coda mergers had taken place or were taking place in the Ba–Shu language during the Song dynasty:

- *i(ə)m and *i(ə)n often merged as *-n (真侵部合併).
- *i(ə)n and *i(ə)ŋ often merged as *-n (真青部合併), this progress can be abbreviated as /*im/ > /*in/ < /*iŋ/.
- *an and *aŋ sometimes merged as *-n.
- *am and *an sometimes merged as *-n.
  - Ditto, which can be abbreviated as /*am/ > /*an/ < /*aŋ/.
- *-t, *-k, and *-p probably all merged as *-ʔ, and sometimes are dropped entirely (especially in the west of the Sichuan Basin).

== Vocabulary ==
Ba–Shu language had some unique words that scholars identified as possibly being influenced by the Old Shu language.

Word	Recorded period	Translation	Middle Chinese pronunciation (Zhengzhang)	Standard Chinese	Note
逼	late Northern and Southern dynasties to early Sui dynasty, c. 600	'pellet'	*pɨk^{D}	bī; 'to force'', ''a common name for the female genitalia'	Yan Zhitui—Yan Family Instructions: "Encouraging Learning" 吾在益州，与数人同坐，初晴日晃，见地上小光，问左右：“此是何物？”有一蜀竖就视，答云：“是豆逼耳。”相顾愕然，不知所谓。命取将来，乃小豆也。穷访蜀士，呼粒为逼，时莫之解。吾云：“三苍、说文，此字白下为匕，皆训粒，通俗文音方力反。”众皆欢悟。 "When I was sitting with several people in Yizhou, I saw a small light [point] on the ground when the sun was shining and asked them, "What is this?" A Shǔ (蜀) child looked at it and replied, "It is a 豆逼; dòu; 'bean'', ''to force'." They looked at each other in bewilderment, not knowing what he said, [We] ordered [him] to bring [the object] over and [found that] it was a small bean. When I visited many learned men in Shǔ, [I asked them why that child] called 粒; lì; 'pellet' as 逼, but no one could explain it. I said: '[According to] Sancang and Shuowen, this character is 匕; bǐ; 'dagger' under 白; bái; 'white', generally interpreted as 粒, the common literal reading is 方力反.' (Note: 方力 *ʉɐ̄ŋ lɨk → pɨk, see fánqiē.) The crowd was enlightened."
姐	Eastern Han	'mother'	*tsia^{B}	jiě; 'elder sister'	Xu Shen—Shuowen Jiezi 蜀人呼母曰姐。 "Shǔ people call mother[s] as 姐."
師	Tang	'monk'	*ʃiɪ^{A}	shī; 'master'	Du Fu—Alone, Looking For Blossoms Along The River "#5" 蜀人呼僧为师，葬所为塔。 "Shǔ people call monk[s] as 師 and call burial place[s] as 塔."
塔	Tang	'burying place'	*tʰɑp^{D}	tǎ; 'tower'	Du Fu—Alone, Looking For Blossoms Along The River "#5" 蜀人呼僧为师，葬所为塔。 "Shǔ people call monk[s] as 師 and call burial place[s] as 塔."
圍	Northern Song	'sky'	*ɦʉi^{A}	weí; 'to siege'	Huang Tingjian—与大主簿三十三书 蜀人呼天为围。 "Shǔ people call sky as 圍."
葭萌	Han	'tea tree', also an ancient hydronym and a name of county	*kˠa^{A} mˠɛŋ^{A}	jiāméng	Yang Xiong—Fangyan

== Notable speakers ==
Notable speakers of the Ba–Shu language include the "Three Sūs": (三蘇, sān sū):

- Sū Shì (蘇軾), who was from Meízhōu (眉州), Chéngdū circuit (成都府路).
- Sū Zhé (蘇轍), Sū Shì's younger brother.
- Sū Xún (蘇洵), Sū Shì and Sū Zhé's father.

== See also ==
- Ba–Shu culture
- Ancient Kingdom of Ba
- Ancient Kingdom of Shu
- Second Kingdom of Shu
- Third Kingdom of Shu
- Fourth Kingdom of Shu
