= Xichong County =

Xichong 西充县
- County
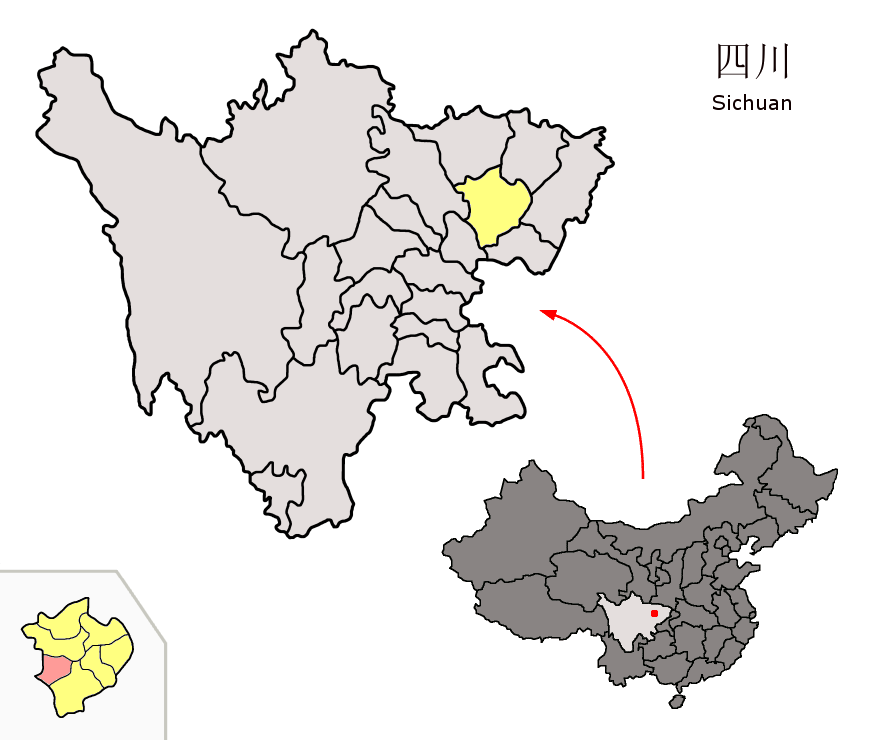
- Location of Xichong County (orange) within Nanchong City (yellow) and Sichuan
- Interactive map of Xichong
- Coordinates: 30°59′46″N 105°54′00″E
- Country: China
- Province: Sichuan
- Prefecture-level city: Nanchong
- County seat: Jincheng

Area
  - Total: 1,108 km^{2} (428 sq mi)

Population (2020 census)
  - Total: 420,023
  - Density: 379.1/km^{2} (981.8/sq mi)
- Time zone: UTC+8 (China Standard)
- Postal code: 637200
- Area code: 0817
- Website: Official Website

Xichong County (Chinese: 西充县; pinyin: Xīchōng Xiàn) is a county in the northeast of Sichuan Province, China. It is under the administration of the prefecture-level city of Nanchong.

== Historical Evolution ==
During the Republic of China (1912-1949), the establishment of Xichong County was the same as the time of the Qing dynasty. In 1914, North Sichuan Road was changed to Jialing Road, and Xichong County was under the jurisdiction of Jialing Road. In 1935, the road was abandoned and changed to the 11th Administrative Inspectorate District of Sichuan Province.

After the Chinese Civil War concluded, and the People's Republic of China was founded, the North Sichuan Administrative office was established, and Xichong came under the jurisdiction of the Nanchong Special District.

== Administrative divisions ==
Xichong County comprises 2 subdistricts, 16 towns and 5 townships:

subdistricts

- Nantai 南台街道
- Jincheng 晋城街道

towns

- Taiping 太平镇
- Daquan 大全镇
- Xianlin 仙林镇
- Gulou 古楼镇
- Yixing 义兴镇
- Guanwen 关文镇
- Fengming 凤鸣镇
- Qingshi 青狮镇
- Huaishu 槐树镇
- Minglong 鸣龙镇
- Shuangfeng 双凤镇
- Gaoyuan 高院镇
- Renhe 仁和镇
- Duofu 多扶镇
- Lianchi 莲池镇
- Changlin 常林镇

townships

- Zhanshan 占山乡
- Xianglong 祥龙乡
- Chelong 车龙乡
- Dongtai 东太乡
- Guanya 罐垭乡

== Population ==
As of 2014, the population is 650,000, down from 658,000 in 2013.

Population of Xichong County from 2004 to 2014
2004	2005	2006	2007	2008	2009	2010	2011	2012	2013	2014
636,000	630,000	636,000	644,000	652,000	656,000	659,000	658,000	658,000	658,000	650,000

The population density of Xichong is approximately 590 people per kilometre squared, based on population figures from 2014.

== Climate ==
Much like most of the Eastern half of Sichuang, Xichong experiences a humid subtropical climate.

Climate data for Xichong, elevation 378 m (1,240 ft), (1991–2020 normals, extremes 1981–present)
Month	Jan	Feb	Mar	Apr	May	Jun	Jul	Aug	Sep	Oct	Nov	Dec	Year
Record high °C (°F)	19.1 (66.4)	23.3 (73.9)	31.9 (89.4)	34.2 (93.6)	36.7 (98.1)	37.5 (99.5)	41.5 (106.7)	42.4 (108.3)	40.5 (104.9)	32.6 (90.7)	26.0 (78.8)	17.8 (64.0)	42.4 (108.3)
Mean daily maximum °C (°F)	9.4 (48.9)	12.5 (54.5)	17.5 (63.5)	23.3 (73.9)	27.0 (80.6)	29.4 (84.9)	32.1 (89.8)	32.3 (90.1)	26.8 (80.2)	21.1 (70.0)	16.2 (61.2)	10.4 (50.7)	21.5 (70.7)
Daily mean °C (°F)	6.0 (42.8)	8.6 (47.5)	12.8 (55.0)	17.9 (64.2)	21.7 (71.1)	24.6 (76.3)	27.2 (81.0)	26.9 (80.4)	22.4 (72.3)	17.3 (63.1)	12.5 (54.5)	7.3 (45.1)	17.1 (62.8)
Mean daily minimum °C (°F)	3.3 (37.9)	5.6 (42.1)	9.3 (48.7)	13.8 (56.8)	17.6 (63.7)	20.9 (69.6)	23.4 (74.1)	23.0 (73.4)	19.4 (66.9)	14.7 (58.5)	9.8 (49.6)	4.9 (40.8)	13.8 (56.8)
Record low °C (°F)	−3.3 (26.1)	−2.0 (28.4)	−1.1 (30.0)	4.0 (39.2)	8.7 (47.7)	13.9 (57.0)	16.9 (62.4)	16.2 (61.2)	12.2 (54.0)	2.1 (35.8)	0.4 (32.7)	−4.4 (24.1)	−4.4 (24.1)
Average precipitation mm (inches)	14 (0.6)	15.6 (0.61)	32.1 (1.26)	67.8 (2.67)	98.9 (3.89)	152.6 (6.01)	169.8 (6.69)	158.0 (6.22)	124.6 (4.91)	76.9 (3.03)	27.5 (1.08)	14.5 (0.57)	952.3 (37.54)
Average precipitation days (≥ 0.1 mm)	8.5	7.4	9.6	10.9	12.8	13.6	12.2	10.7	13.3	14.4	8.4	7.5	129.3
Average snowy days	0.8	0.4	0	0	0	0	0	0	0	0	0	0.3	1.5
Average relative humidity (%)	84	80	77	76	75	80	80	78	84	86	85	86	81
Mean monthly sunshine hours	49.4	56.1	94.9	132.0	140.1	130.5	175.6	186.8	105.0	72.0	63.8	42.6	1,248.8
Percentage possible sunshine	15	18	25	34	33	31	41	46	29	21	20	14	27
Source: China Meteorological Administrationall-time extreme temperatureall-time July record
