= Weiyuan County, Sichuan =

Coordinates: 29°31′28″N 104°40′05″E

Weiyuan County 威远县
- County
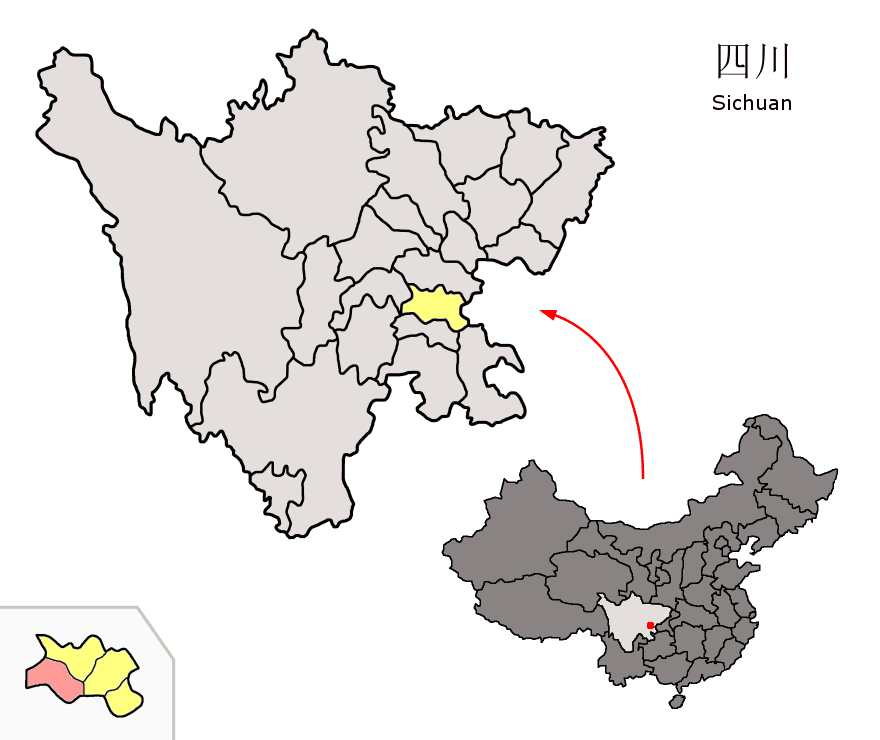
- Country: China
- Province: Sichuan
- Prefecture-level city: Neijiang
- County seat: Yanling

Area
  - Total: 1,287.22 km^{2} (497.00 sq mi)

Population (2020 census)
  - Total: 547,059
  - Density: 424.993/km^{2} (1,100.73/sq mi)
- Time zone: UTC+8 (China Standard)

Weiyuan County (simplified Chinese: 威远县; traditional Chinese: 威遠縣; pinyin: Wēiyuǎn Xiàn) is a county of Sichuan Province, China. It is under the administration of Neijiang City. The county borders Neijiang, Zigong, Rongxian, Zizhong and Renshou. It administers 20 townships.

Weiyuan County manages 20 towns with an area of 1288.85k square meters and a total population of 547,059 people (as of 2020), including 31 ethnic groups including Han, Tujia, Yi, and Miao.

The religions in Weiyuan County mainly include Buddhism, Catholicism, and Christianity. Buddhism has been spreading for the longest time, has the most followers, and has the greatest influence in the county.

Weiyuan County has abundant mineral resources with a complete range of varieties, including natural gas, oil, iron ore, limestone, bauxite shale ore, potassium containing water mica clay ore (commonly known as mung bean mud), quartz sand, kaolin, dolomite, calcite, gypsum, rock salt, and co occurring minerals such as potassium, boron, bromine, iodine, as well as rare elements such as radium, lithium, rubidium, and gallium.

== Administrative divisions ==
Weiyuan County comprises 14 towns:

- Yanling 严陵镇
- Xindian 新店镇
- Xiangyi 向义镇
- Jiepai 界牌镇
- Longhui 龙会镇
- Gaoshi 高石镇
- Donglian 东联镇
- Zhenxi 镇西镇
- Shanwang 山王镇
- Guanyingtan 观英滩镇
- Xinchang 新场镇
- Lianjie 连界镇
- Yuexi 越溪镇
- Xiaohe 小河镇

== Climate ==
Climate data for Weiyuan, elevation 351 m (1,152 ft), (1991–2020 normals, extremes 1981–present)
Month	Jan	Feb	Mar	Apr	May	Jun	Jul	Aug	Sep	Oct	Nov	Dec	Year
Record high °C (°F)	19.5 (67.1)	24.1 (75.4)	32.4 (90.3)	34.7 (94.5)	37.6 (99.7)	37.9 (100.2)	41.1 (106.0)	43.1 (109.6)	38.6 (101.5)	31.3 (88.3)	25.8 (78.4)	18.5 (65.3)	43.1 (109.6)
Mean daily maximum °C (°F)	10.4 (50.7)	13.6 (56.5)	18.6 (65.5)	24.1 (75.4)	27.6 (81.7)	29.2 (84.6)	31.7 (89.1)	31.7 (89.1)	27.0 (80.6)	21.6 (70.9)	17.2 (63.0)	11.6 (52.9)	22.0 (71.7)
Daily mean °C (°F)	7.7 (45.9)	10.2 (50.4)	14.4 (57.9)	19.4 (66.9)	22.9 (73.2)	25.0 (77.0)	27.3 (81.1)	27.2 (81.0)	23.3 (73.9)	18.5 (65.3)	14.2 (57.6)	9.1 (48.4)	18.3 (64.9)
Mean daily minimum °C (°F)	5.6 (42.1)	7.8 (46.0)	11.4 (52.5)	15.9 (60.6)	19.5 (67.1)	22.0 (71.6)	24.2 (75.6)	23.9 (75.0)	20.7 (69.3)	16.5 (61.7)	12.1 (53.8)	7.2 (45.0)	15.6 (60.0)
Record low °C (°F)	−2.4 (27.7)	−0.5 (31.1)	1.1 (34.0)	6.2 (43.2)	10.3 (50.5)	15.2 (59.4)	18.2 (64.8)	17.4 (63.3)	14.4 (57.9)	5.5 (41.9)	3.2 (37.8)	−1.5 (29.3)	−2.4 (27.7)
Average precipitation mm (inches)	9.3 (0.37)	13.7 (0.54)	26.9 (1.06)	55.1 (2.17)	81.4 (3.20)	146.3 (5.76)	184.5 (7.26)	171.9 (6.77)	114.8 (4.52)	46.6 (1.83)	18.7 (0.74)	8.8 (0.35)	878 (34.57)
Average precipitation days (≥ 0.1 mm)	7.9	7.3	9.5	12.0	13.0	15.5	14.2	12.9	14.7	14.4	7.8	7.1	136.3
Average snowy days	0.3	0.2	0	0	0	0	0	0	0	0	0	0.2	0.7
Average relative humidity (%)	80	76	71	70	70	78	79	78	81	83	80	81	77
Mean monthly sunshine hours	41.6	56.2	96.5	123.8	125.4	104.1	142.3	157.3	87.3	51.8	52.7	37.1	1,076.1
Percentage possible sunshine	13	18	26	32	30	25	33	39	24	15	17	12	24
Source: China Meteorological Administration all-time extreme temperature all-time January highall-time July high
