= Minjiang dialect =

Dialect of Sichuanese Chinese

Minjiang
- Nanlu
- 岷江话
- Pronunciation: [min˨˩tɕiaŋ˥xa˨˨˦]
- Native to: China
- Region: Sichuan, Chongqing, Guizhou and Yunnan
- Language family: Sino-Tibetan: Sinitic; Chinese; Ba–Shu (Disputed) Mandarin (Disputed); Southwestern?; Sichuanese?; Minjiang
- Early forms: Proto-Sino-Tibetan: Old Chinese; Ba–Shu Chinese (Disputed) Middle Chinese (Disputed); Old Mandarin (Disputed)
- Dialects: Leshan

Language codes
- ISO 639-3: –
- Linguist List: cmn-xgm
- Glottolog: None
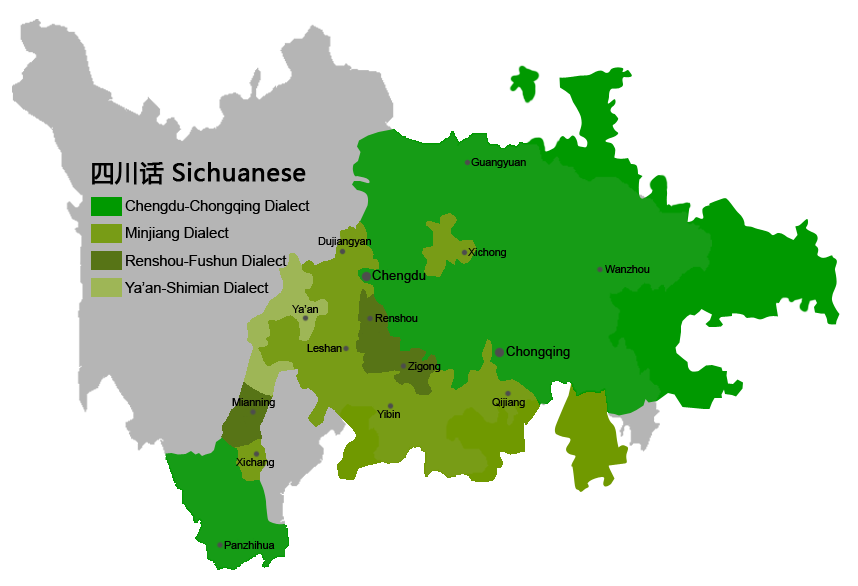
- Minjiang is the central light khaki-green area around the cities and counties of Dujiangyan, Leshan, Yibin, Qijiang, Xichong (n), Xichang (sw), and an area to the east.

The Minjiang dialect (simplified Chinese: 岷江话; traditional Chinese: 岷江話, locally [min˨˩tɕiaŋ˥xa˨˨˦]; pinyin: Mínjiānghuà) is a possible Sichuanese dialect spoken mainly in the Min River (Mínjiāng) valley or along the Yangtze in the southern and western parts of the Sichuan Basin in China. There is also a language island of the Minjiang dialect located in the center of the Sichuan Basin covering several counties, including all of Xichong, Yanting, and Shehong Counties, and part of Jiange, Cangxi, Nanbu, Langzhong and Bazhong. The Minjiang dialect is also referred to as the Nanlu dialect by some scholars.

The primary characteristic of the Minjiang dialect is that the stop consonants for checked-tone syllables in Middle Chinese have developed into tense vowels to create a phonemic contrast, and in several cities and counties the tense vowels retain a following glottal stop. It also keeps many characteristics of Ba–Shu Chinese phonology and vocabulary. Due to these characteristics, the status of the Minjiang dialect is disputed among linguists, with some classifying it as Southwestern Mandarin, and others setting it apart as a continuation of Ba–Shu Chinese, the native language of Sichuan before the end of the Yuan dynasty.
