= Sichuanese Pinyin =

Romanization for Sichuanese varieties of Chinese

Sichuanese Pinyin (Si^{4}cuan^{1}hua^{4} Pin^{1}yin^{1}; simplified Chinese: 四川话拼音; traditional Chinese: 四川話拼音; pinyin: Sìchuānhuà pīnyīn), is a romanization system specifically designed for the Chengdu dialect of Sichuanese. It is mostly used in selected Sichuanese dictionaries, such as the Sichuan Dialect Dictionary, Sichuan Dialect's Vocabulary Explanation, and the Chengdu Dialect Dictionary. Sichuanese Pinyin is based on Hanyu Pinyin, the only Chinese romanization system officially instructed within the People's Republic of China, for convenience amongst users. However, Hanyu Pinyin is unable to match the phonology of Sichuanese with complete precision, especially in the case for the Minjiang dialect, as there are many differences between Sichuanese and Standard Chinese in phonology.

== Scheme ==
=== Initials ===
Below each IPA symbol in the table below are the letters which correspond to their respective sounds in Sichuanese Pinyin, and a sample Chinese character with that initial:

		Bilabial	Labiodental	Coronal	Alveolar	Alveopalatal	Velar	Semivowel
Plosive	plain	[p] b 贝			[t] d 得		[k] g 古	
Plosive	aspirated	[pʰ] p 配			[tʰ] t 套		[kʰ] k 可	
Affricate	plain			[ts] z 早		[tɕ] j 价		[w] w ㄨ
Affricate	aspirated			[tsʰ] c 草		[tɕʰ] q 巧		[j] y ㄧ
Nasal		[m] m 没		[n] n 路		[nʲ] ȵ 你	[ŋ] ng/ŋ 我	
Fricative	Voiceless		[f] f 发	[s] s 速		[ɕ] x 小	[x] h 好	
Fricative	voiced		[v] v 五	[z] r/th 如				
Zero		∅ 儿						

=== Finals ===
Below each IPA symbol in the table below are the letters which correspond to their respective sounds in Sichuanese Pinyin, and a sample Chinese character with that syllable rime:

	-Ø					-i or -u				nasal finals			
Ø-	[z] i 日	[ɚ] er 二	[a] a 大	[o] o 我	[ɛ] e 黑	[ai] ai 街	[ei] ei 批	[au] ao 包	[əu] ou 走	[an] an 烦	[ən] en 樱	[aŋ] ang/aŋ 帮	[oŋ] ong/oŋ 亩
i-	[i] i 一		[ia] ia 牙		[iɛ] ie 叶	[iai] iai 介		[iau] iao 标	[iəu] iu 九	[ian] ian 变	[in] in 兵	[iaŋ] iang/iaŋ 量	
u-	[u] u 五		[ua] ua 瓜		[uɛ] ue 国	[uai] uai 乖	[uei] ui 类			[uan] uan 段	[uən] un 春	[uaŋ] uang/uaŋ 光	
y-	[y] ü 鱼			[yo] üo 药	[ye] üe 绝					[yan] üan 鲜	[yn] ün 泳		[yoŋ] iong/ioŋ 蓉

=== Tones ===
The Sichuanese Pinyin system uses superscript numbers to mark the four tones of Chengdu dialect. The number is placed on the top right corner of every syllable, where "1" stands for the first tone, "2" stands for the second tone, and so forth.

=== Rules ===
The rules of Sichuanese Pinyin are based on those of Hanyu Pinyin, with some slight modifications:

- When the final -ong has a zero-initial, it is written ong (instead of weng, as in Hanyu Pinyin).
- As in Hanyu Pinyin, -ü is written -u when paired with the alveolo-palatal initials j-, q- and x-; however, this rule is not extended to the additional Sichuanese alveolo-palatal ȵ- (e.g. 女 ȵü^{3}).

== Sample text ==
The following sample text is a selection of Sichuanese idioms in Sichuanese Pinyin, Scuanxua Latinxua Sin Wenz (in Sichuanese) and Hanyu Pinyin (in Standard Mandarin pronunciation), for comparative purposes:

Chinese characters	Sichuanese Pinyin	Scuanxua Ladinxua Xin Wenz	Hanyu Pinyin
矮子过河，安（淹）了心。	Ngai^{3}zi^{3} go^{4} ho^{2}, ngan^{1} no^{2} xin^{1}.	Ngaaiz go ho, ngan lo xin.	Ǎizi guò hé, yān le xīn.
足正不怕鞋歪。	Juo^{2} zen^{4} bu^{2}pa^{4} hai^{2} wai^{1}.	Giuo zen bupa xai uai.	Zú zhèng búpà xié wāi.
吃苞谷粑打哈欠，开黄腔。	Ci^{2} bao^{1}gu^{2}ba^{1} da^{3} ho^{1}hai^{1}, kai^{1} huang^{2}qiang^{1}.	C baoguba daa xoxai, kai xuongkiang.	Chī bāogǔbā dǎ hāqiàn, kāi huángqiāng.
猫抓糍粑，脱不到爪爪。	Mer^{1} zua^{1} ci^{2}ba^{1}, to^{2} bu^{2}dao^{3} zao^{3}zao^{3}.	Mer zua cba, to budao zaozao.	Māo zhuā cíbā, tuō bùdào zhuǎzhuǎ.
