= Southwestern Mandarin =

Primary branch of Mandarin Chinese

- Upper Yangtze Mandarin
- Region: Sichuan, Yunnan, Guangxi, Guizhou, Hubei, others
- Native speakers: 260 million (2012)
- Language family: Sino-Tibetan: Sinitic; Chinese; Mandarin; Southwestern Mandarin

Official status
- Official language in: Myanmar (Wa State, Kokang Self-Administered Zone)

Language codes
- ISO 639-3: None (mis)
- ISO 639-6: xghu
- Glottolog: xina1239
- Linguasphere: 79-AAA-bh
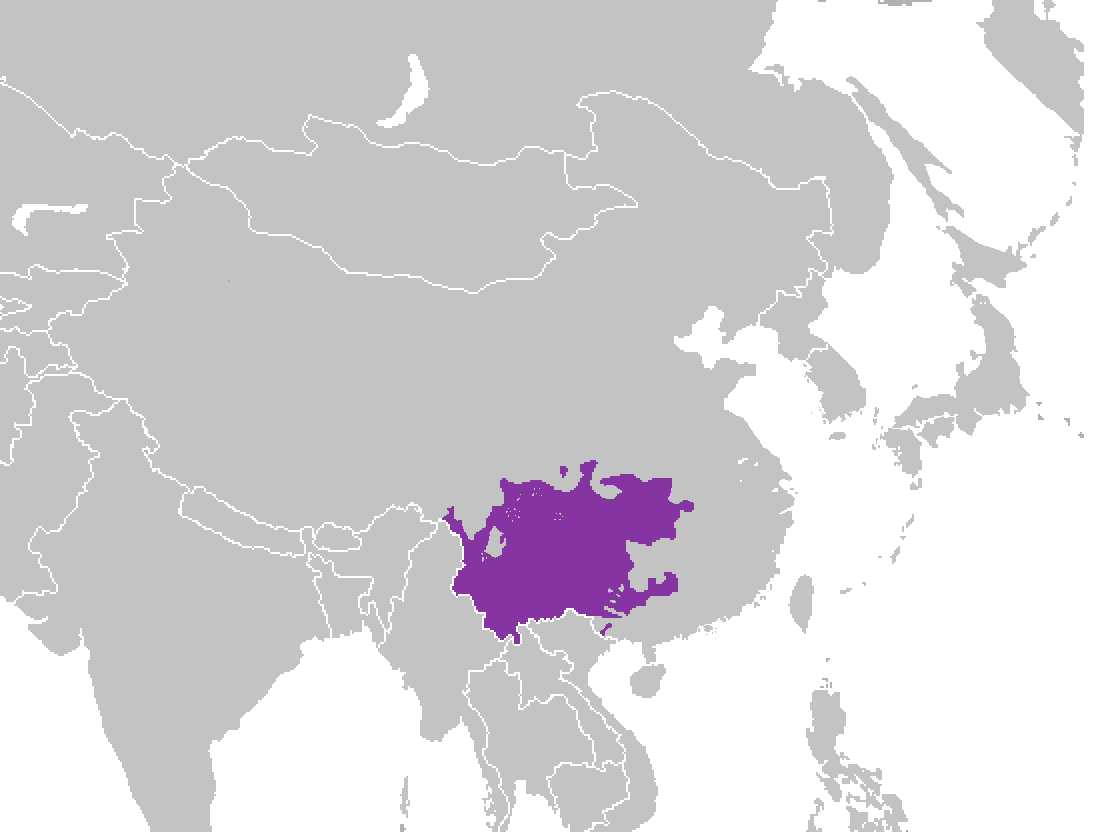

Two Southwest Mandarin speakers, recorded in Richmond Hill, Canada.

Southwestern Mandarin (Chinese: 西南官话; pinyin: Xīnán Guānhuà), also known as Upper Yangtze Mandarin (Chinese: 上江官话; pinyin: Shàngjiāng Guānhuà), is a Mandarin Chinese subgroup spoken in much of Southwestern China, including in Sichuan, Yunnan, Chongqing, Guizhou, most parts of Hubei, the northwestern part of Hunan, the northern part of Guangxi and some southern parts of Shaanxi and Gansu.

Southwestern Mandarin is spoken by roughly 260 million people. If considered a language distinct from central Mandarin, it would be the eighth-most spoken language by native speakers in the world, behind Mandarin itself, Spanish, English, Hindi, Portuguese, Arabic and Bengali.

== Overview ==
Modern Southwestern Mandarin was formed by the waves of immigrants brought to the regions during the Ming and Qing Dynasties. Because of the comparatively recent move, such dialects show more similarity to modern Standard Mandarin than to other varieties of Chinese like Cantonese or Hokkien. For example, while like other Southern Chinese dialects, Southwestern Mandarin does not possess the distinction of retroflex consonants of Middle Chinese (/ʈ͡ʂ/ ⟨zh⟩, /ʈ͡ʂʰ/ ⟨ch⟩, /ʂ/ ⟨sh⟩, /ɻ/ ⟨r⟩) preserved in Standard Mandarin, most varieties of it also fail to retain the checked tone that many southern dialects have. The Chengdu-Chongqing and Hubei dialects are believed to reflect aspects of the Mandarin lingua franca that was spoken during the Ming. However, some scholars believe its origins may be more similar to Lower Yangtze Mandarin. Though part of the Mandarin group, Southwestern Mandarin has many striking and pronounced differences with Standard Mandarin such that until 1955, it was generally categorized alongside Cantonese and Wu Chinese as a branch of other Chinese varieties.

Southwestern Mandarin is also used between different ethnic minorities in Yunnan, Guizhou, and Guangxi.

Southwestern Mandarin is commonly spoken in Kokang district in Northern Myanmar, where the population is largely Kokang. Southwestern Mandarin is also one of two official languages of the Wa State, an unrecognized autonomous state within Myanmar, alongside the Wa language. Because Wa has no written form, Chinese is the official working language of the Wa State government. Some of its speakers, known as the Chin Haw, live in Thailand. It is also spoken in parts of Northern Vietnam, where it is locally known as Quan hỏa. Ethnic minorities in Vietnam's Lào Cai province used to speak Southwestern Mandarin to each other when their languages were not mutually intelligible.

== Language contact ==
=== Migration ===
The historical development of Southwestern Mandarin has been closely connected to large-scale migration and demographic restructuring in southwestern China. Many scholars associate the formation of the modern dialect group with extensive population movements during the Ming and Qing dynasties, especially following warfare and depopulation in Sichuan after the late Yuan and early Ming periods. Historical records describe substantial migration into Sichuan, Guizhou, and Yunnan from regions such as Hunan, Guangdong, Jiangxi, and the Lower Yangtze area. These migrants brought different varieties of Chinese, such as the Xiang language and Cantonese, into contact with one another, contributing to the emergence of new regional forms of Mandarin.

Linguists have frequently described this process as one of dialect levelling and koineization. Rather than preserving a single ancestral dialect, Southwestern Mandarin developed through sustained interaction among speakers of multiple varieties. As a result, many local forms of Southwestern Mandarin share features with northern Mandarin groups while simultaneously displaying phonological and lexical characteristics not found in Contemporary Standard Mandarin. For instance, in the Sichuan dialect, the third and fourth tones have pitch patterns that are almost exactly the reverse of those in Standard Mandarin.

The role of migration is particularly important because it demonstrates that Southwestern Mandarin was not simply transmitted through uninterrupted inheritance. Instead, its development reflects broader social and political processes, including state-sponsored resettlement and frontier expansion. Such developments correspond to the kinds of contact-induced language change rather than the internal development of a single geographic dialect group.

=== Trade networks ===
Trade routes across southwestern China also contributed significantly to the linguistic ecology in which Southwestern Mandarin developed. One particularly important example is the Tea Horse Road, a historical network of caravan routes connecting southwestern China with Tibet and parts of mainland Southeast Asia. Through the circulation of merchants, soldiers, migrants, and local communities, the route facilitated contact among speakers of Sinitic, Tibeto-Burman, Tai, Hmong-Mien, and other language families. In many regions, varieties of Southwestern Mandarin functioned as practical lingua francas for interethnic communication and commercial exchange.

This multilingual environment distinguished southwestern China from more linguistically homogeneous regions of northern China. Provinces such as Yunnan and Guizhou have always contained substantial populations speaking Tibetic, Yi, Bai, Zhuang, and Hmong-Mien languages. Contact between Mandarin-speaking migrants and these local populations produced localized variation in pronunciation, vocabulary, and discourse practices (e.g., the loss of the retroflex consonants).

The expansion of Southwestern Mandarin beyond present-day China further reflects its historical role as a contact language. Varieties of Southwestern Mandarin are spoken in parts of northern Myanmar, northern Thailand, and northern Vietnam, often in communities historically linked through trade and migration networks. In regions such as Kokang and Wa State in Myanmar, Southwestern Mandarin has functioned not only as a community language but also as an official language.

The relationship between trade and language contact also highlights the sociolinguistic flexibility of Southwestern Mandarin. Rather than functioning exclusively as a local vernacular, it frequently operated as a bridge language among populations lacking mutually intelligible native languages.

=== Linguistic consequences ===
The historical processes of migration and multilingual interaction in southwestern China have contributed to several distinctive linguistic characteristics within Southwestern Mandarin. One commonly noted feature is the reduced use of retroflex consonants compared with Standard Chinese. In many Southwestern Mandarin varieties, Standard Mandarin distinctions such as /ʈ͡ʂ/ ⟨zh⟩, /ʈ͡ʂʰ/ ⟨ch⟩, and /ʂ/ ⟨sh⟩ are merged with /t͡s/ ⟨z⟩, /t͡sʰ/ ⟨c⟩, and /s/ ⟨s⟩. For example, the Standard Mandarin pronunciation of /ʂwei³/ ⟨shuǐ⟩ may be realized as /swei³/ ⟨suǐ⟩ in most Southwestern Mandarin varieties.

Another important feature involves mergers and variations among nasal and lateral initials. In some Southwestern Mandarin dialects, distinctions between /n/ and /l/ are reduced or inconsistently maintained. For example, words beginning with /n-/ in Standard Mandarin may sometimes be pronounced with /l-/ initials in local speech. Certain Sichuanese varieties have additionally been reported to preserve traces of older velar nasal initials in restricted phonological environments. For instance, some speakers may retain an initial velar nasal pronunciation in words historically associated with Middle Chinese /ŋ-/ (e.g., /ŋan²/ ‘tight’ 嚴), even though this feature is absent in Standard Mandarin.

Lexical borrowing and multilingual interaction have also contributed to regional diversity. In frontier areas of Yunnan and Guizhou, Southwestern Mandarin varieties historically existed alongside Tibetic, Bai, Yi, and Tai languages. As a result, local vocabularies sometimes contain terms associated with trade, agriculture, and material culture that differ from northern Mandarin usage (e.g., Baba). While many of these borrowings remain localized, they illustrate how prolonged contact shaped everyday communication in multilingual environments.

These linguistic developments correspond to broader theories of contact-induced language change, namely that sustained multilingual interaction can reshape phonological and lexical systems even in the absence of language shift or creolization. Southwestern Mandarin provides a useful example of this process because many of its characteristic features emerged in regions shaped by migration, trade, and contact among diverse speech communities.

== Phonology ==
=== Tones ===
Most Southwestern Mandarin dialects have, like Standard Mandarin, retained only four of the eight tones of Late Middle Chinese. However, the entering tone has consistently merged with the light-level tone in most Southwestern dialects, while in Standard Mandarin, it is more randomly dispersed among the four remaining tone groups.

Tones of Southwestern Mandarin Dialects
| Name | Dark-Level | Light-Level | Rising | Dark- Departing | Light- Departing | Entering | Geographic Distribution |
|---|---|---|---|---|---|---|---|
| Standard Chinese (for comparison) | ˥ (55) | ˧˥ (35) | ˨˩˦ (214) | ˥˩ (51) | | split across various tones | |
| Sichuan (Chengdu dialect) | ˥ (55) | ˨˩ (21) | ˦˨ (42) | ˨˩˧ (213) | | light-level merge | Main Sichuan Basin, parts of Guizhou |
| Luzhou dialect | ˥ (55) | ˨˩ (21) | ˦˨ (42) | ˩˧ (13) | | ˧ (33) | Southwest Sichuan Basin |
| Luding County dialect | ˥ (55) | ˨˩ (21) | ˥˧ (53) | ˨˦ (24) | | dark-level merge | Ya'an vicinity |
| Neijiang dialect | ˥ (55) | ˨˩ (21) | ˦˨ (42) | ˨˩˧ (213) | | departing merge | Lower Tuo River area |
| Hanzhong dialect | ˥ (55) | ˨˩ (21) | ˨˦ (24) | ˨˩˨ (212) | | level tone merge | Southern Shaanxi |
| Xiangfan dialect | ˧˦ (34) | ˥˨ (52) | ˥ (55) | ˨˩˨ (212) | | light-level merge | Northern Hubei |
| Guilin dialect | ˧ (33) | ˨˩ (21) | ˥ (55) | ˧˥ (35) | | light-level merge | Northern Guangxi, Southern Guizhou, parts of Southern Hunan |
| Kunming dialect | ˦ (44) | ˧˩ (31) | ˥˧ (53) | ˨˩˨ (212) | | light-level merge | Central Yunnan |
| Gejiu dialect | ˥ (55) | ˦˨ (42) | ˧ (33) | ˩˨ (12) | | light-level merge | Southern Yunnan |
| Baoshan dialect | ˧˨ (32) | ˦ (44) | ˥˧ (53) | ˨˥ (25) | | light-level merge | Western Yunnan |
| Huguang (Wuhan dialect) | ˥ (55) | ˨˩˧ (213) | ˦˨ (42) | ˧˥ (35) | | light-level merge | Central Hubei |
| Hanshou dialect | ˥ (55) | ˨˩˧ (213) | ˦˨ (42) | ˧ (33) | ˧˥ (35) | ˥ (55) | Northwestern Hunan (Changde) |
| Shishou dialect | ˦˥ (45) | ˩˧ (13) | ˦˩ (41) | ˧ (33) | ˨˩˦ (214) | ˨˥ (25) | Southern Hubei (Jingzhou) |
| Li County dialect | ˥ (55) | ˩˧ (13) | ˨˩ (21) | ˧ (33) | ˨˩˧ (213) | (light) ˧˥ (35) | Northwestern Hunan (Changde) |

=== Syllables ===
Southwestern Mandarin dialects do not possess the retroflex consonants of Standard Mandarin but share most other Mandarin phonological features. Most dialects have lost the distinction between the nasal consonant /n/ and the lateral consonant /l/ and the nasal finals /-n/ and /-ŋ/. For example, the sounds /le/ and /ne/ are generally indistinguishable. Some varieties also lack a distinction between the labiodental /f/ and the glottal /h/.

== Subdivisions ==
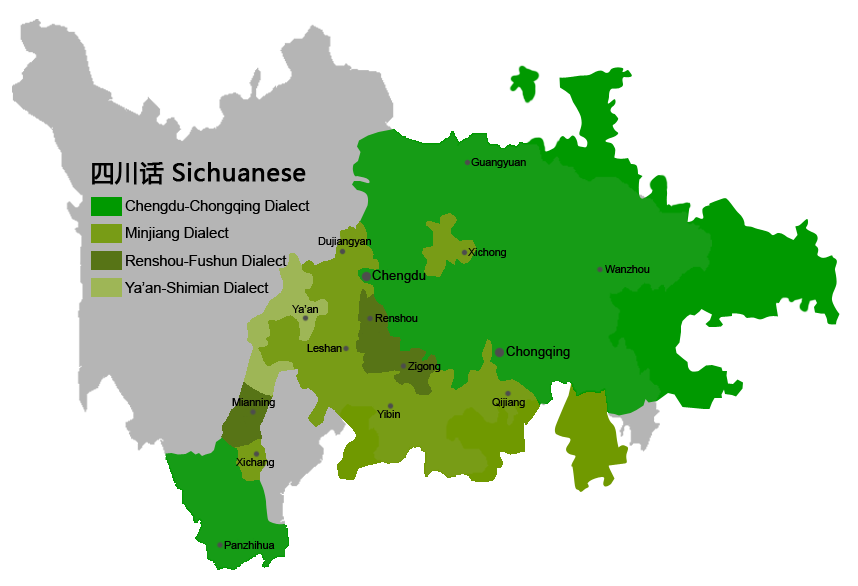
Chengyu and Guanchi subgroups in Sichuan and Chongqing

Southwestern Mandarin was classified into twelve dialect groups in the Language Atlas of China:

- Cheng–Yu 成渝: Chengdu and Chongqing
- Dianxi 滇西 (western Yunnan): Yao–Li 姚里 and Bao–Lu 保潞 clusters
- Qianbei 黔北 (northern Guizhou)
- Kun–Gui 昆貴: Kunming and Guiyang
- Guan–Chi 灌赤 (central Sichuan from Guan County to the Chishui River and part of northern Yunnan): Minjiang 岷江, Ren–Fu 仁富, Ya–Mian 雅棉, and Li–Chuan 丽川 clusters
- Ebei 鄂北 (northern Hubei)
- Wu–Tian 武天: Wuhan and Tianmen (Hubei)
- Cen–Jiang 岑江 (eastern Guizhou)
- Qiannan 黔南 (southern Guizhou)
- Xiangnan 湘南 (southern Hunan): Yongzhou and Chenzhou
- Gui–Liu 桂柳 (northern Guangxi): Guilin and Liuzhou
- Chang–He 常鹤: Changde and Zhangjiajie (northwestern Hunan) and Hefeng County (southwestern Hubei)

In addition, the Selibu language is a mixed language with a Southwestern Mandarin base, residual Zhongyuan Mandarin features, and morphosyntatic and semantic features from Alangu Khams.

== See also ==
- Sichuanese dialects
