= Four tones (Middle Chinese) =

Tonal system of Middle Chinese

The four tone classes of Chinese
꜂上 shǎng	去꜄ qù
꜀平 píng	入꜆ ru(ʔ)

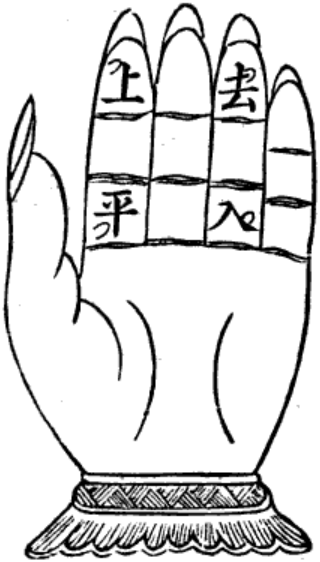
An old illustration of the four tone classes, in their traditional representation on a hand. In modern use, the diacritics all face the character, as in the table above.

The four tones of Chinese poetry and dialectology (simplified Chinese: 四声; traditional Chinese: 四聲; pinyin: sìshēng) are four traditional tone classes of Chinese words. They play an important role in Chinese poetry and in comparative studies of tonal development in the modern varieties of Chinese, both in traditional Chinese and in Western linguistics. They correspond to the phonology of Middle Chinese, and are named "even" or "level" (平; píng), "rising" (上; shǎng), "departing" or "going" (去; qù), and "entering" or "checked" (入; rù). The last three are collectively referred to as "oblique" (仄; zè), an important concept in poetic tone patterns, whereas the first three are collectively referred to as "lax" (舒; shū), contrasting with "tense" (促; cù), which is occasionally used in linguistics. Due to historic splits and mergers, none of the modern varieties of Chinese have the exact four tones of Middle Chinese, but they are noted in rhyming dictionaries.

== Background ==
According to the usual modern analysis, Early Middle Chinese had three phonemic tones in most syllables, but no tonal distinctions in checked syllables ending in the stop consonants /p/, /t/, /k/. In most circumstances, every syllable had its own tone; hence a multisyllabic word typically had a tone assigned to each syllable. (In modern varieties, the situation is sometimes more complicated. Although each syllable typically still has its own underlying tone in most dialects, some syllables in the speech of some varieties may have their tone modified into other tones or neutralized entirely, by a process known as tone sandhi. Furthermore, many varieties of Chinese deleted Middle Chinese final consonants, but these contrasts may have been preserved, helping lead to tonogenesis of contemporary multitonal systems.)

Traditional Chinese dialectology reckons syllables ending in a stop consonant as possessing a fourth tone, known technically as a checked tone. This tone is known in traditional Chinese linguistics as the entering (入 rù) tone, a term commonly used in English as well. The other three tones were termed the level (or even) tone (平 píng), the rising (上 shǎng) tone, and the departing (or going) tone (去 qù). The practice of setting up the entering tone as a separate class reflects the fact that the actual pitch contour of checked syllables was quite distinct from the pitch contour of any of the sonorant-final syllables. Indeed, implicit in the organisation of the classical rime tables is a different, but structurally equally valid, phonemic analysis, which takes all four tones as phonemic and demotes the difference between stop finals [p t k] and nasal finals [m n ŋ] to allophonic, with stops occurring in entering syllables and nasals elsewhere.

From the perspective of modern historical linguistics, there is often value in treating the entering tone as a tone regardless of its phonemic status, because syllables possessing this tone typically develop differently from syllables possessing any of the other three tones. For clarity, these four tones are often referred to as tone classes, with each word belonging to one of the four tone classes. This reflects the fact that the lexical division of words into tone classes is based on tone, but not all tone classes necessarily have a distinct phonemic tone associated with them. Some contemporary fāngyán such as Taiwanese Hokkien, Jin and Penang are said to preserve the entering tone, which is used as a marker to differentiate them from other varieties and also genetically classify them via the comparative method.

The four Early Middle Chinese (EMC) tones are nearly always presented in the order level (平 píng), rising (上 shǎng), departing (去 qù), entering (入 rù), and correspondingly numbered 1 2 3 4 in modern discussions. In Late Middle Chinese (LMC), each of the EMC tone classes split in two, depending on the nature of the initial consonant of the syllable in question. Discussions of LMC and the various modern varieties will often number these split tone classes from 1 through 8, keeping the same ordering as before. For example, LMC/modern tone classes 1 and 2 derive from EMC tone class 1; LMC/modern tone classes 3 and 4 derive from EMC tone class 2; etc. The odd-numbered tone classes 1 3 5 7 are termed dark (陰 yīn), whereas the even-numbered tone classes 2 4 6 8 are termed light (陽 yáng). Hence, for example, LMC/modern tone class 5 is known in Chinese as the yīn qù (dark departing) tone, indicating that it is the yīn variant of the EMC qù tone (EMC tone 3). In order to clarify the relationship between the EMC and LMC tone classes, some authors notate the LMC tone classes as 1a 1b 2a 2b 3a 3b 4a 4b in place of 1 2 3 4 5 6 7 8, where a and b correspond directly to Chinese yīn and yáng, respectively.

Baxter's transcription, an alphabetic notation for representing Middle Chinese, represents the rising (上 shǎng) tone with a trailing X, the departing (去 qù) tone with a trailing H, and it leaves the level and entering tones unmarked.

== Names ==
In Middle Chinese, each of the tone names carries the tone it identifies: 平 level ꜁biajŋ, 上 rising ꜃dʑɨaŋ, 去 departing kʰɨə꜄, and 入 entering ȵip꜇. However, in some modern Chinese varieties, this is no longer true. This loss of correspondence is most notable in the case of the entering tone, syllables checked in a stop consonant [p̚], [t̚], or [k̚] in Middle Chinese, which has been lost from most dialects of Mandarin and redistributed among the other tones.

In modern Chinese varieties, tones that derive from the four Middle Chinese tone classes may be split into two registers, dark (陰 yīn) and light (陽 yáng) depending on whether the Middle Chinese onset was voiceless or voiced, respectively. When all four tone classes split, eight tones result: dark level (陰平), light level (陽平), dark rising (陰上), light rising (陽上), dark departing (陰去), light departing (陽去), dark entering (陰入), and light entering (陽入). Sometimes these have been termed upper and lower registers respectively, but that may be a misnomer, as in some dialects the dark registers may have the lower tone, and the light register the higher tone.

Chinese dictionaries mark the tones with diacritical marks at the four corners of a character: ꜀平 level, ꜂上 rising, 去꜄ departing, and 入꜆ entering. When yin and yang tones are distinguished, these are the diacritics for the yin (dark) tones; the yang (light) tones are indicated by underscoring the diacritic: ꜁平 light level, ꜃上 light rising, 去꜅ light departing, 入꜇ light entering. These diacritics are also sometimes used when the phonetic realization is unknown, as in the reconstructions of Middle Chinese at the beginning of this section. However, in this article, the circled numbers ①②③④⑤⑥⑦⑧ will be used, as in the table below, with the odd numbers ①③⑤⑦ indicating either 'dark' tones or tones that have not split, and even numbers ②④⑥⑧ indicating 'light' tones. Thus, level tones are numbered ①②, the rising tones ③④, the departing tones ⑤⑥, and the entering (checked) tones ⑦⑧.

In Yue (incl. Cantonese) the dark entering tone further splits into high (高陰入) and low (低陰入) registers, depending on the length of the nucleus, for a total of nine tone classes. Some dialects have a complex tone splittings, and the terms dark and light are insufficient to cover the possibilities.

The number of tone classes is based on Chinese tradition, and is as much register as it is actual tone. The entering 'tones', for example, are distinct only because they are checked by a final stop consonant, not because they have a tone contour that contrasts with non-entering tones. In dialects such as Shanghainese, tone classes are numbered even if they are not phonemically distinct.

== Origin ==
The tonal aspect of Chinese dialects that is so important today is believed by some linguists to have been absent from Old Chinese, but rather came about in Early Middle Chinese after the loss of various finals. According to Sagart (1999:11),

"Old Chinese was a toneless language. Tones arose between Old Chinese and Early Middle Chinese (that is between 500 BCE and 500 CE) as a result of the loss of final laryngeals."

However, the Eastern Han Chinese stage (c. first century CE) is reconstructed as still without phonologically distinctive tone.

The four tones of Middle Chinese, 平 píng 'level', 上 shǎng 'rising', 去 qù 'departing', and 入 rù 'entering', all evolved from different lost final consonants in Old Chinese. The 上, or "rising tone", arose from the loss of glottal stops at the end of words. Support for this can be seen in Buddhist transcriptions of the Han period, where the rising tone was often used to note Sanskrit short vowels, and also in loans of words with final [q] in source languages such as Khotanese, which were borrowed into Chinese as shǎng tone. The Old Chinese glottal stop even survives in some Wu, Min and Hakka dialects, either as a phonetic glottal stop (attested in a Hakka dialect of Pengxin 朋新村, in western Fujian; it is also found in Wenzhounese), a short creaky vowel (the most common form across Min Chinese varieties, especially Inland Min varieties), or denasalization, which for example the final [-ŋ] of Old Chinese has changed to modern [ɡ] in shǎng-tone words (attested in a variety from Wan'an 萬安鎮). This evolution of final glottal stop into a rising tone is similar to what happened to form the sắc and nặng tones in Vietnamese.

The 去, or "departing tone", arose from the loss of [-s] at the end of words. Support for this theory is found when examining Chinese loans into neighbouring East Asian languages. For example, in Korean, the word for comb, 빗 pis, is a loan of the Chinese word bì 篦, which means that when the word comb was borrowed into Korean, there was still an [-s] sound at the end of the word that later disappeared from Chinese and gave rise to a departing 去 tone. The 入, or "entering tone", consisted of words ending in voiceless stops, [-p], [-t], and [-k]. Finally, the 平, or "level tone", arose from the remaining syllables, which have either vowels or sonorant consonants at the ends of words, and thus ending neither in [-s], a glottal stop, nor [-p], [-t], or [-k].

== Distribution in modern languages ==
Sample dialects and their realization of tone are given below.

Different authors typically have different opinions as to the shapes of Chinese tones. Tones typically have a slight purely phonetic drop at the end in citation form. It is therefore likely that a tone with a drop of one unit (54, say, or 21) is not distinct from a level tone (a 55 or 22); on the other hand, what one author hears as a significant drop (53 or 31) may be perceived by another as a smaller drop so it is often ambiguous whether a transcription like 54 or 21 is a level or contour tone. Similarly, a slight drop before a rise, such as a 214, may be from the speaker approaching the target tone and so may also not be distinctive (from 14).

Distribution of the four tone classes in modern Chinese Each tone class is numbered ① to ⑧, depending on its reflex of Late Middle Chinese, followed by its actual pronunciation, using a tone letter to illustrate its contour and then a numerical equivalent.
Major Group	Subgroup or Cluster	Locality	Early Middle Chinese tone class																number of tone classes (number of phonemic tones)
Major Group	Subgroup or Cluster	Locality	꜀平 Level ꜀①꜁②				꜂上 Rising ꜂③꜃④				去꜄ Departing ⑤꜄⑥꜅				入꜆ Entering ⑦꜆⑧꜇				number of tone classes (number of phonemic tones)
Major Group	Subgroup or Cluster	Locality	Syllable onset																number of tone classes (number of phonemic tones)
Major Group	Subgroup or Cluster	Locality	voiceless		voiced		voiceless		voiced		voiceless		voiced		voiceless		voiced		number of tone classes (number of phonemic tones)
Major Group	Subgroup or Cluster	Locality	tenuis	asp	son	obs	tenuis	asp	son	obs	tenuis	asp	son	obs	tenuis	asp	son	obs	number of tone classes (number of phonemic tones)
Sample characters:			高	天	人	平	早	考	武	棒	布	怕	外	大	百	七	入	白	number of tone classes (number of phonemic tones)
Mandarin	Northeastern	Beijing	① ˥ 55		② (Note: A muddy consonant becomes aspirated here rather than tenuis. (Note a historical entering tone will not be aspirated.)) ˧˥ 35		③ ˨˩˦ 21(4) (Note: In the citation form, Beijing tone ③ may end with a rising segment.)			⑤ ˥˩ 51 (Note: Mandarin 4th tone.)					(any) (Note: Irregular development, due to dialect mixing in the capital. However, colloquial readings tend to display tones ① and ③, whereas literary readings tend to display ② and ⑤. The preservation of the literary readings is chiefly due to 協韻 xiéyùn, artificial preservation of rhyming pronunciations for words that rhyme in classical poetry.)		⑤	②	4
Mandarin	Northeastern	Taipei	① ˦ 44		② ˧˨˧ 323		③ ˧˩˨ 31(2)			⑤ ˥˨ 52					(any)		⑤	②	4
Mandarin	Northeastern	Harbin	① ˦ 44		② ˨˧ 23		③ ˨˩˧ 213			⑤ ˥˧ 53					(any)				4
Mandarin	Northeastern	Shenyang	① ˧ 33		② ˧˥ 35		③ ˨˩˧ 213			⑤ ˥˧ 53					(any)				4
Mandarin	Jiao–Liao	Dalian	① ˦˨ 42		① or ②	② ˧˥ 35	③ ˨˩˧ 213			⑤ ˥˧ 53					③		⑤	②	4
Mandarin	Jiao–Liao	Qingdao	① ˨˩˧ 213		② ˦˨ 42		③ ˥ 55			① or ②					③		②		3
Mandarin	Ji–Lu	Tianjin	① ˨˩ 21		② ˧˥ 35		③ ˩˩˧ 113			⑤ ˥˧ 53					①		⑤	②	4
Mandarin	Ji–Lu	Jinan	① ˨˩˧ 213		② ˦˨ 42		③ ˥ 55			⑤ ˨˩ 21					①		⑤	②	4
Mandarin	Zhongyuan (Central Plains)	Luoyang	① ˧ 33		② ˧˩ 31		③ ˥˧ 53			⑤ ˦˩˨ 412					①			②	4
Mandarin	Zhongyuan (Central Plains)	Zhengzhou	① ˨˦ 24		② ˦˨ 42		③ ˥˧ 53			⑤ ˧˩˨ 312					①			②	4
Mandarin	Zhongyuan (Central Plains)	Xuzhou	① ˨˩˧ 213		② ˥ 55		③ ˧˥ 35			⑤˥˩ 51					①			②	4
Mandarin	Zhongyuan (Central Plains)	Xi'an	① ˧˩ 31		② ˨˦ 24		③ ˦˨ 42			⑤ ˥ 55					①			②	4
Mandarin	Zhongyuan (Central Plains)	Xining	① ˦ 44		② ˨˦ 24		③ ˥˧ 53			⑤ ˨˩˧ 213					①			②	4
Mandarin	Zhongyuan (Central Plains)	Dungan	① ˨˦ 24				③ ˥˩ 51			⑤ ˦ 44					①			③	3
Mandarin	Lan–Yin	Lanzhou	① ˧˩ 31		② ˥˧ 53		③ ˦˦˨ 442			⑤ ˩˧ 13								②	4
Mandarin	Lan–Yin	Yinchuan	① ˦ 44		② (Note: The light level and rising tones are identical in monosyllables but behave differently in sandhi.) ˥˧ 53					⑤ ˩˧ 13									3 (4)
Mandarin	Lan–Yin	Ürümqi	① ˦ 44		② ˥˩ 51					⑤ ˨˩˧ 213					①		⑤	②	3
Mandarin	Southwestern	Wuhan	① ˥ 5		② ˨˩˧ 213		③ ˦˨ 42			⑤ ˧˥ 35					②				4
Mandarin	Southwestern	Chengdu	① ˥ 5		② ˨˩ 21		③ ˦˨ 42			⑤ ˨˩˧ 213					②				4
Mandarin	Southwestern	Luzhou	① ˥ 5		② ˨˩ 21		③ ˦˨ 42			⑤ ˩˧ 13					⑦ (Note: The entering tone(s) are distinct because they are checked by a final stop. (Wenzhounese is an exception: Entering tone is distinct without a final stop.)) ˧ 3				5
Mandarin	Southwestern	Kunming	① ˦ 4		② ˧˩ 31		③ ˥˧ 53			⑤ ˨˩˨ 212					②				4
Mandarin	Southwestern	Guilin	① ˧ 3		② ˨˩ 21		③ ˥˦ 54			⑤ ˨˦ 24					②				4
Mandarin	Huai	Nanjing	① ˧˩ 31		② ˩˧ 13		③ ˨˩˨ 212			⑤ ˦ 44					⑦ ˥ 5				5 (4)
Mandarin	Huai	Yangzhou	① ˩ 11		② ˧˥ 35		③ ˦˨ 42			⑤ ˥ 55					⑦ ˦ 4				5 (4)
Mandarin	Huai	Nantong	① ˧˥ 35		② ˨˩ 21		③ ˥ 55			⑥	⑤ ˨˩˧ 213		⑥ ˨˦ 42		⑦ ˥ 55ʔ		⑧ ˨˦ 42ʔ		7 (5)
Jin	Bingzhou	Taiyuan	① ˩ 11				③ ˥˧ 53			⑤ ˦˥ 45					⑦ ˨ 2			⑧ ˥˦ 54	5 (3)
Wu	Northern	Shanghai	① ˥˨ 52		⑥ (Note: In Wu and Old Xiang, the 'light' tones are always dependent on voiced initials, and so are not phonemically distinct. In Wenzhounese, rising tone is likewise marked with a final glottal stop.)		⑤		⑥		⑤ ˧˧˦ 334		⑥ ˩˩˧ 113		⑦ ˥ 5		⑧ ˨˧ 23		5 (2)
Wu	Northern	Xinzhuang	① ˥˧ 53		② ˧˩ 31		③ ˦ 44		⑥		⑤ ˧˥ 35		⑥ ˨˦ 24		⑦ ˥ 5		⑧ ˨ 2		7 (3)
Wu	Northern	Suzhou	① ˦ 44		② ˨˦ 224		③ ˥˨ 52		⑥		⑤ ˦˩˨ 412		⑥ ˧˩ (2)31		⑦ ˦ 4		⑧ ˨˧ 23		7 (3)
Wu	Northern	Wujiang (Note: The exact distribution may vary depending on the town or village in the county. Tone values shown are that of Songling and Tongli.)	①a ˥ 55	①b ˧ 33	② ˩˧ 13		③a ˥˩ 51	③b ˦˨ 42	④ ˧˩ 31		⑤a ˦˩˨ 412	⑤b ˧˩˨ 312	⑥ ˨˩˨ 212		⑦a ˥ 5	⑦b ˧ 3	⑧ ˨ 2		12 (3)
Wu	Northern	Yixing	① ˥ 55		② ˩˥ 15		③ ˥˩ 51		④ ˧˥ 35	④/⑥	⑤ ˥˩˧ 513		⑥ ˨˩ 21		⑦ ˥ 5/⑧		⑧ ˩˧ 13		8 (3)
Wu	Northern	Hangzhou	① ˧ 33		② ˨˩˧ 213		③ ˥˧ 53			⑥	⑤ ˦˦˥ 445		⑥ ˩˧ 13		⑦ ˥ 5		⑧ ˨ 2		7 (3)
Wu	Northern	Ningbo	① ˥˧ 53		② ˨˦ 24		③ ˧˥ 35		⑥		⑤ ˦ 44		⑥ ˨˩˧ 213		⑦ ˥ 5		⑧ ˩˨ 12		7 (3)
Wu	Oujiang	Wenzhou	① ˦ 44		② ˧˩ 31		③ʔ/④ʔ ˧˥ 35				⑤ ˥˨ 52		⑥ ˨ 22		⑦/⑧ ˧˨˧ 323				8 (4–6)
Huizhou	Ji-She	Jixi	① ˧˩ 31		② ˦ 44		③ ˨˩˧ 213				⑤ ˧˥ 35		⑥ ˨ 22		⑦ ˧˨ 32				6 (5)
Xiang	New	Changsha	① ˧ 33		② ˩˧ 13		③ ˦˩ 41			⑥	⑤ ˥ 55		⑥ ˨˩ 21		⑦ ˨˦ 24				6 (5)
Gan	Changjing	Nanchang	① ˦˨ 42		⑤	② ˨˦ 24	③ ˨˩˧ 213			⑥	⑤ ˥ 55	③	⑥ ˨˩ 21		⑦ ˥ 5		⑧ ˨˩ 21		7 (5)
Hakka	Meizhou	Meixian	① ˦ 44		② ˩ 11		③ ˧˩ 31			⑤ ˥˨ 52					⑦ ˨˩ 21		⑧ ˦ 4		6 (4)
Yue	Yuehai	Guangzhou, Hong Kong	①a ˥ 55 ~ ①b ˥˧ 53 (Note: A lexical tone change for some speakers in Guangzhou, mostly obsolete in Hong Kong. High Level becomes High Falling when the character isn't used as a concrete noun. For other speakers, both realizations are interchangeable, and High Level seems to be dominant.)		② ˨˩ 21~11		③ (Note: Some studies show that in Hong Kong Cantonese the two rising tones are used interchangeably by some younger speakers indicating an ongoing merger, but this is in fact extremely uncommon.) ˨˥ 25		④ ˨˧ 23	④/⑥ (Note: A muddy consonant becomes aspirated here and the syllable acquires tone ④ in colloquial readings, but in literary pronunciations it is tenuis and the syllable becomes tone ⑥.)	⑤ ˧ 33		⑥ ˨ 22		⑦a ˥ 5 ⑦b ˧ 3 (Note: In Yue varieties, the "a-b" split in tones ⑦ and ⑧ is not by aspiration but by vowel length. For instance, 北; bak^{1}, which has a short vowel, is pronounced with a higher tone than 八; baat^{3}, which has a long vowel.)		⑧ ˨ 2		9~10 (6~7)
Yue	Yuehai	Shiqi	① ˥ 55		② ˥˩ 51		③ ˩˧ 13				⑤ ˨ 22				⑦a ˥ 5	⑧ ˨ 2			6 (4)
Yue	Siyi	Taishan	① ˧ 33		②^{?} ˩ 11		③ ˥ 55		④^{?} ˨˩ 21		①		⑥ ˧˨ 32		⑦a ˥ 5 ⑦b˧ 3		⑧ ˨˩ 21		8 (5)
Yue	Gou-Lou	Bobai	① ˦ 44		②^{?} ˨˧ 23		③ ˧ 33		④^{?} ˦˥ 45		⑤ ˧˨ 32		⑥ ˨˩ 21		⑦a ˥˦ 54 ⑦b ˩ 1		⑧a ˦ 4 ⑧b ˧˨ 32		10 (6)
Pinghua	Southern	Nanning	① ˥˨ 52		②^{?} ˨˩ 21		③ ˦ 44		④^{?} ˨˦ 24		⑤ ˥ 55		⑥ ˨ 22		⑦ ˦ 4		⑧a ˨˦ 24 ⑧b ˨ 2		9 (6)
Min	Northern	Jian'ou	① ˥˦ 54		⑤	③ ˨˩ 21					⑤ ˨ 22		⑥ ˦ 44		⑦ ˨˦ 24		⑧ ˦˨ 42		6 (4)
Min	Eastern	Fuzhou	① ˥ 55		② ˥˧ 53		③ ˧ 33		③/⑥ (Note: In the Fuzhou dialect and the Fuqing dialect, the traditional rising tone with voiced sonorant onsets have undergone a split, where in literary readings they are in tone ③ with their unvoiced counterparts, but in colloquial readings they are merged into ⑥. Examples include 五, 耳, 雨, 兩.)	⑥	⑤ ˨˩˧ 213		⑥ ˨˦˨ 242		⑦ ˨˦ 24		⑧ ˥ 5		7 (5)
Min	Central	Yong'an	① ˦˨ 42		② ˧ 33		③ ˨˩ 21			④ ˥˦ 54	⑤ ˨˦ 24				⑦ ˩˨ 12				6
Min	Southern	Quanzhou	① ˧ 33		② ˨˦ 24		③ ˥ 55		③/④ (Note: In Southern Min, there is a literary–colloquial split in syllables with the traditional rising tone and voiced sonorant onsets. The literary readings have tone ③, while the vernacular pronunciations have tone ④ (in some languages, like Xiamen and Zhangzhou Hokkien, tone ④ is merged with tone ⑥). Some examples include 瓦, 五, 耳, 雨, 兩.)	④ ˨ 22	⑤ (Note: In the Quanzhou Hokkien, the traditional 'light' and 'dark' departing tone categories are only differentiated by their behavior under tone sandhi; they are pronounced the same in isolation.) ˦˩ 41		⑥ ˦˩ 41		⑦ ˥ 5		⑧ ˨˦ 24		8 (6)
Min	Southern	Xiamen	① ˥ 55		② ˧˥ 35		③ ˥˧ 53		③/⑥	⑥	⑤ ˨˩ 21		⑥ ˧ 33		⑦ ˩ 1		⑧ ˥ 5		7 (5)
Min	Southern	Chaozhou	① ˧ 33		② ˥ 55		③ ˥˨ 52		③/④	④ ˧˥ 35	⑤ ˨˩˧ 213		④ / ⑥ ˩ 11 (Note: In Teochew, there is a literary–colloquial split in syllables with the departing tone and voiced initials: literary readings have tone ④, while vernacular readings have tone ⑥. For examples see e.g. 命, 健, 匠, 讓, 賴, 病.)		⑦ ˨ 2		⑧ ˦ 4		8 (6)
Min	Southern	Longyan	① ˧˧˦ 334		② ˩ 11		③ ˨˩ 21		③/④	④ ˥˨ 52	⑤ ˨˩˧ 213		④ / ⑥ ˥ 55 / ① (Note: In Longyan, Leizhou, and Hainanese, there is a literary–colloquial split in syllables with the departing tone and voiced initials: literary readings have tone ④ or ⑥, while vernacular readings have tone ①.)		⑦ ˥ 5 / ⑥ (Note: In Longyan, Leizhou, and Hainanese, syllables with historical entering tone have distinct literary and colloquial readings. The literary readings preserve the final stops (/-p, -t, -k/), while the vernacular readings lose the general Southern Min glottal stop and assume non-checked tones.)		⑧ ˧˨ 32 / ④		8 (6)
Sino-Vietnamese	Northern	Hanoi	① ˦ 44			② ˧˨ 32	③ ˧˩˨ 312		④ ˧˨˥ 325	④/⑥	⑤ ˧˦ 34		⑥ ˨ 22		⑦ ˦˥ 45		⑧ ˨˩ 21		8 (6)
Sino-Vietnamese	Central	Hue	① ˥˦˥ 545			② ˦˩ 41	③ ˧˨ 32			③/⑥	⑤ ˨˩˦ 214		⑥ ˧˩ 31		⑦ ˦˧˥ 435		⑧ ˧˩ 31		7 (5)
Sino-Vietnamese	Southern	Saigon	① ˦ 44			② ˧˩ 31	③ ˨˩˦ 214			③/⑥	⑤ ˧˥ 35		⑥ ˨˩˨ 212		⑦ ˦˥ 45		⑧ ˨˩ 21		7 (5)
Sino-Korean	Middle Korean		Low				Rising 〯 (Note: Syllables with Middle Korean rising tone have long vowels in modern Standard Korean. Vowel length is distinguished in word-initial syllables in Standard Korean, but this distinction is increasingly not maintaned among speakers.) / High 〮 (Note: MC Rising 上 and Departing 去 tones are merged in Middle Korean, chiefly reflected as Middle Korean rising tone (marked with two dots in old Hangul). However, around 20% of characters with these two MC tones have Middle Korean high tone (marked with one dot). The exact pattern of this split is not clear, and characters with the same MC reading may have different tones in Middle Korean and hence different vowel lengths in modern Standard Korean (cf. 古 고〯 ko^{R} and 鼓 고〮 ko^{H}).)								High 〮				3
major group	subgroup	local variety	tenuis	asp	son	obs	tenuis	asp	son	obs	tenuis	asp	son	obs	tenuis	asp	son	obs	number of tone classes (number of phonemic tones)
major group	subgroup	local variety	voiceless		voiced		voiceless		voiced		voiceless		voiced		voiceless		voiced		number of tone classes (number of phonemic tones)
major group	subgroup	local variety	Syllable onset																number of tone classes (number of phonemic tones)
major group	subgroup	local variety	꜀平 Level ꜀①꜁②				꜂上 Rising ꜂③꜃④				去꜄ Departing ⑤꜄⑥꜅				入꜆ Entering ⑦꜆⑧꜇				number of tone classes (number of phonemic tones)
major group	subgroup	local variety	Early Middle Chinese tone class																number of tone classes (number of phonemic tones)

== See also ==
- Four tones (Mandarin Chinese), the modern outcome of the development of these tones in Standard Mandarin
- Proto-Tai language#Tones, a similar set of tones in a non-Chinese language
