= Hikari Guru Rin Bus =

Japanese bus service

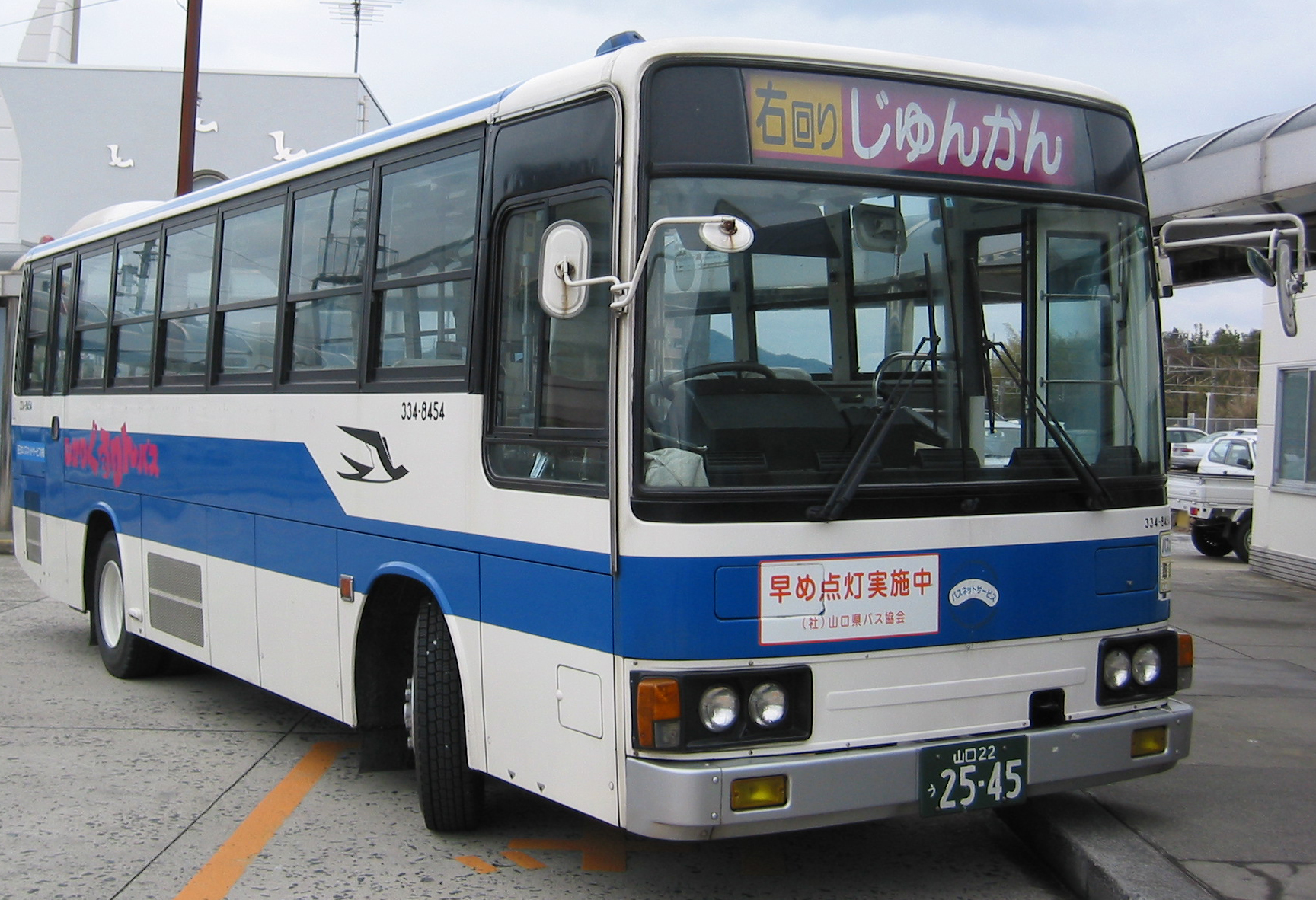
- Hikari Gururin Bus vehicle, 2005

Overview
- Operator: Shunan Kintetsu Taxi (since 2024)
- Status: Active
- Former operator: West Japan Bus Net Service

Route
- Locale: Hikari, Yamaguchi
- Start: Hikari Station
- End: Hikari Station

The Hikari Gururin Bus is a community bus in Hikari City, Yamaguchi Prefecture.

== History ==
The Hikari Guru Rin Bus began operation on March 14, 1998, following the February 28 closure of the Chugoku JR Bus Iwakari Line. It was operated by West Japan Bus Net Service, a subsidiary of Chugoku JR Bus and ran 19 trips per day at a fare of 180 yen. This was increased to 21 trips per day by July 11. Initially, Hikari Guru Rin was operated directly by Chugoku JR Bus, but due to legal restrictions stipulating local governments cannot subsidize the operation of JR Bus routes, it was forced to gradually scale back in order to reduce its deficit, and was eventually driven to the brink of closure. As a solution, it was decided to operate the service through a company separate from Chugoku JR Bus, which allowed it to receive subsidies from local governments. The number of trips was decreased to 13 per day in October 1999 and three per day in April 2000 before Nishinippon Busnet Service took over as operator and increased the trips to 8. They also raised the fare to 200 yen.

The line mainly runs through the western part of Hikari city, starting and ending at JR Sanyo Main Line Hikari Station. It has free boarding and alighting areas, and passes through large housing complexes, public facilities such as Hikari General Hospital, and the AEON Hikari store. In 2003, the route was changed to stop outside of the Wada Jutaku instead of the Asae Wada, and changed again the following April to accommodate changes in the operating hours of the Hikari Station North Exit stop. In 2019, when Hikari General Hospital was relocated, the route was changed, and trips were reduced to six per day.

In August 2023, West Japan Bus Net Service announced its withdrawal from the Hikari Gururin Bus service following the closure of its Suo Office by Chugoku JR Bus, the parent company of West Japan Bus Net Service. After the city of Hikari made adjustments, Mayor Ichikawa Akira announced at the Hikari City Council meeting on December 6, 2023, that Shunan Kintetsu Taxi (Boncho Transportation Group, Kintetsu Taxi Group), which has its business base in Hikari City, would take over the route. The group began operating on April 1 2024.

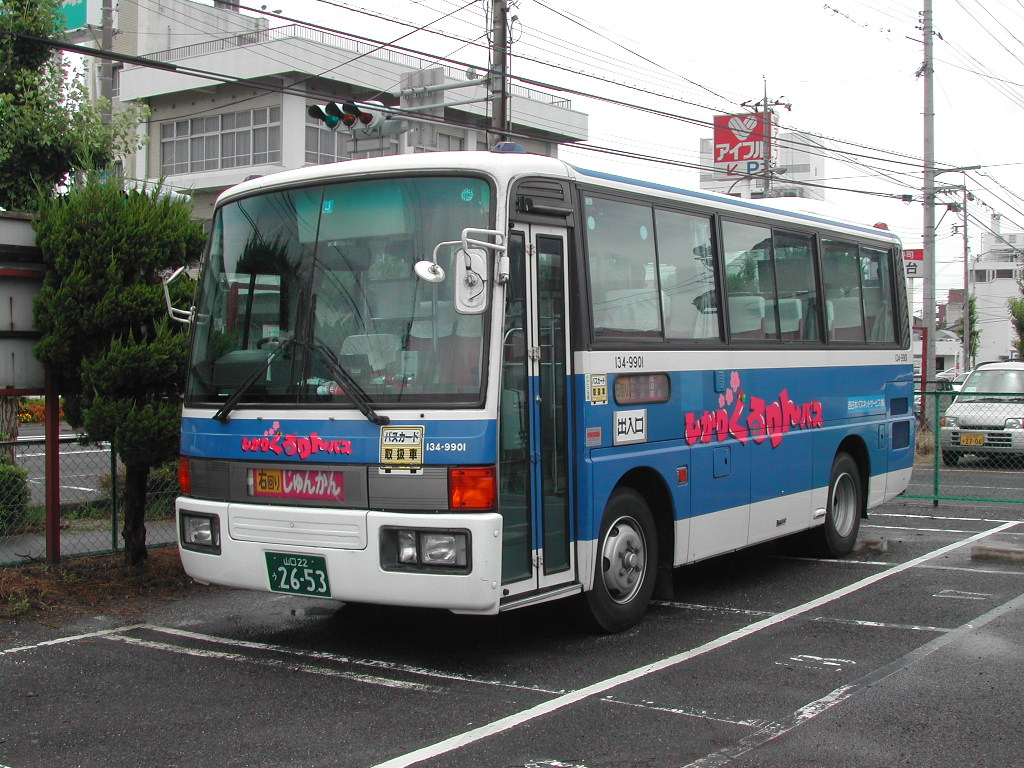
An early vehicle (134-9901)

== Route and fare ==
The current route starts and ends at JR Sanyo Main Line Hikari Station. There are eight trains per day, four clockwise and four counterclockwise, and six trains per day on weekends and holidays. One loop takes about 50 minutes. The distance is 18.4 kilometres (11.4 mi). One ride costs 200 yen for adults and 100 yen for children. Bus passes provide riders with the option to travel as frequently as they like and are targeted towards those 65 or older. A six month pass costs 10,230 yen and a one year pass costs 19,460 yen.

Sections excluded from the free boarding and alighting allowance are Hikari Station to Tsutsui; Hikari Civic Hall to Kanayama; and Hikari City Hall to Shimada City (up to Chitose Ohashi Bridge).
