= Hikari =

Hikari (ひかり; "Sparkle or Light") may refer to:

== Places ==
- Hikari Station, a station on Sanyō Main Line in Hikari, Yamaguchi
- Hikari, Chiba, a former town in Sousa District, Chiba, Japan
- Hikari, Yamaguchi, a city in Yamaguchi Prefecture, Japan

== People ==
- Hikari (name), people and characters with the name
- Hikari (director), a writer, director and producer.

== Film and TV ==
- Radiance (2017 film), original title Hikari
- Hikari TV, IPTV provider and production company

== Music ==
- Hikari (Maaya Uchida album)
- Hikari (Sid album)
- Hikari (Oceans Ate Alaska album), or the title song by Oceans Ate Alaska, 2017
- "Hikari" (Mai Hoshimura song), a 2008 song by Mai Hoshimura
- "Hikari" (Hikaru Utada song), a 2001 song by Hikaru Utada
- "Hikari", a 2006 song by Yui Horie
- "Hikari", a 2007 song by Nujabes and Substantial
- "Hikari", a 2012 song by BT from If the Stars Are Eternal So Are You and I
- "Hikari", a 2017 song by Pentagon
- "Hikari", a 2020 song by Envy from The Fallen Crimson

== Other uses ==
- Hikari (company), a brand of flake-style fish food
- Hikari danio, a species of danio fish in Burma
- Hikari Sentai Maskman, the 11th entry of the Sentai Series
- Hikari (train), a train service running on the Tōkaidō/Sanyō Shinkansen in Japan
- Nakajima Hikari, a family of radial aircraft engines
- A type of card in the hanafuda game Koi-Koi
