= Jiaoliao =

Jiaoliao may refer to:

- Jiaoliao people, a Han Chinese ethnolinguistic group
- Jiaoliao Mandarin, a primary dialect of Mandarin Chinese
