= Hikari Naval Arsenal =

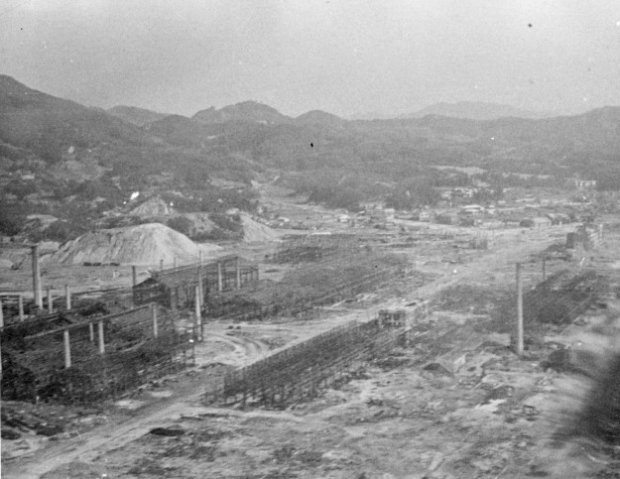
Hikari Naval Arsenal after it was bombed on August 14, 1945.

Hikari Naval Arsenal (光海軍工廠, Hikari kaigun kōshō) was a naval arsenal located in Hikari, Yamaguchi Prefecture, Japan. It opened on October 1, 1940. It produced steel, engines, cannon, torpedoes, and bombs for the Imperial Japanese Navy. It was bombed on the afternoon of August 14, 1945 (the day before the official Surrender of Japan) by four B-29 bomber groups. The raid was reported to have taken place after Emperor Hirohito had begun his surrender message to the Japanese people. It was carried out by the XXI Bomber Command, classified as mission 325. Its target code was "Thunderhead" (Note: According to Robert Mann's The B-29 Superfortress: A Comprehensive Registry of the Planes and Their Missions, the raid took place on August 9th and 10th and no further missions were flown there.)

== History of Hikari Naval Arsenal ==
Hikari Naval Arsenal was opened on October 1, 1940, and was in operation for just under five years. It only had two commanders: the first was Tomoyuki Seno'o (妹尾知之) from October 1, 1940, to October 1, 1943, when he was succeeded by Ei Tamura (田村英), who served until the surrender on August 15, 1945.

== Raid and aftermath ==
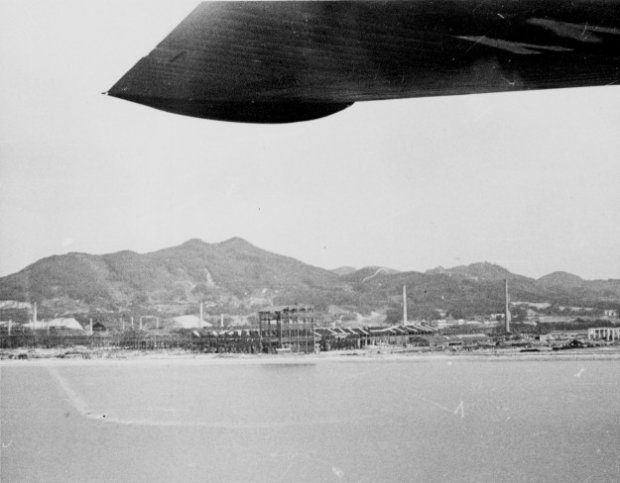
Aerial view of Hikari Naval Arsenal after it was bombed on August 14, 1945.

The raid involved the XXI Bomber Command, 58th Bomber Wing, Bomber Groups 40, 444, 462, and 468, with a total of 190 aircraft.

The area was rebuilt and now houses manufacturing facilities for Nippon Steel & Sumitomo Stainless Steel Corporation (NSSC) as well as for Takeda Pharmaceuticals.
