= 光 =

"光" means "light" in East Asian languages. It is the native title of:

- Hikari (Hikaru Utada song)
- Hikari (train)
- Radiance (2017 film)
- Guang (film)

== See also ==
- Hikari
- Guang
