= Tangshan dialect =

- 唐山话
- Native to: Tangshan region and surrounding regions, Hebei province, China
- Language family: Sino-Tibetan: Sinitic; Mandarin Chinese; Jilu Mandarin; Baotang branch; Jizun sub-branch; Tangshan dialect

Official status
- Official language in: None
- Regulated by: None

Language codes
- ISO 639-1: zh
- ISO 639-2: chi (B) zho (T)
- ISO 639-3: cmn

Tangshan dialect is a Mandarin dialect spoken and used in the administrative region of Tangshan, Hebei Province. It belongs to the Ji-Lu Mandarin dialect group of the Bao-Tang subgroup. Like the Tianjin dialect, it is largely comprehensible to Standard Mandarin speakers, but its greatest deviation from other Mandarin varieties lies in the different tone values and the way tones affect each other.

== Phonology ==
=== Initial consonants ===
Tangshan dialect has 23 initial consonants, one more than Standard Mandarin: /ŋ/. The difference from Standard Mandarin is:

1. Open vowels with zero initials are preceded by the initial /n/ or /ŋ/, as in "安、熬、爱".
2. Some alveolar consonants /ʦ, ʦʰ, s/ are pronounced as retroflex consonants /ʈʂ, ʈʂʰ, ʂ/, as in "暂、租、扫、测".
3. The aspiration of initials differs from that in Standard Mandarin. Tangshan dialect uses aspirated initials but Standard Mandarin uses unaspirated ones, such as "堤、撞、庇", while Tangshan dialect uses unaspirated initials but Standard Mandarin uses aspirated ones, such as "炽、券、比".
4. Fricatives and affricates have different pronunciations. For example, "朽" /ʨʰi̯oʊ̯/ and "摔" /ʈʂu̯aɪ̯/.

=== Word finals ===
Finals are largely the same as in Standard Mandarin, with the following differences:

1. The /o/ following /p, pʰ, m, f/ is pronounced /ɤ/ in Tangshan dialect, as in “播”, “婆”, “模”, “佛”. /ʊŋ/ is sometimes pronounced /əŋ/, as in “农”, “粽”.
2. Some words have the initial /u/ lost. For example, “滦” /lan/, “润” /ʐən/, “暖” /nan/.
3. Some Dangjiang-acquired initials that are pronounced /y̯œ/ in Standard Mandarin are pronounced /i̯ɑʊ̯/, as in “约”, “觉”, “学”, “略”.
4. Other variant pronunciations: “叔” /ʂoʊ̯/, “起” /ʨʰi̯ɛ/, “谜” /meɪ̯/.

=== Tones ===
It has 4 tones, as shown below compared to Mandarin:

Tone	Level tone		Rising tone	Falling tone
Tone	Yin tone	Yang tone	Rising tone	Falling tone
Tangshan dialect	˦˦ (44)	˦˩ (41)	˨˩˧ (213)	˥˩ (51)
Standard Mandarin	˥ (55)	˧˥ (35)	˨˩˦ (214)	˥˩ (51)

=== Tone contours ===
Tangshan dialect is characterized by its "melodic" tone variations, with frequent changes in pitch within sentences or phrases, especially at the end. Except for declarative sentences, the second-to-last syllable is often lengthened and its pitch raised, while the final syllable's pitch is falling-rising. These tonal characteristics are important factors in creating the distinctive sound of Tangshan dialect.
