= Dalian dialect =

Dialect of Mandarin Chinese

- 大连话
- Pronunciation: /tɑ^{52} lien^{24} xuɑ^{52}/
- Region: Liaodong Peninsula
- Language family: Sino-Tibetan: Sinitic; Chinese; Mandarin; Jiao-Liao Mandarin; Dalian dialect

Language codes
- ISO 639-1: zh
- ISO 639-3: –
- Glottolog: None

The Dalian dialect (simplified Chinese: 大连话; traditional Chinese: 大連話; pinyin: Dàliánhuà, Romaji: Dairen-ben) is a dialect of Mandarin Chinese spoken on the Liaodong Peninsula, China including the city of Dalian and parts of Dandong and Yingkou. The Dalian dialect shares many similarities with the Yantai dialect and Weihai dialect spoken on Shandong Peninsula (Jiaodong Peninsula), to the south of the Bohai Strait; hence each of them is a subset of Jiao Liao Mandarin. The Dalian dialect is notable among Chinese dialects for loanwords from Japanese and Russian, reflecting its history of foreign occupation.

Notable words in the Dalian dialect include 彪 ("foolish") and 熊 ("to cheat or deceive").

== Phonology ==
=== Comparing with Mandarin on pronunciation ===
Contrast of Dalianian and Mandarin on pronunciation
Mandarin → Dalianian	Example
zh, ch, sh, r → z, c, s, y retroflexes merged with alveolars, r merged with y	中國人 zhōng guó rén → zōng guó yín
d, t, n, l, z, c, s + uei, uan, uen → d, t, n, l, z, c, s + ei, an, en removal of labiovelar glide after alveolars	對 dù(e)i → dèi
o and individual uo → e	胳膊 gē bo → gĕ be 脫 tuō → tĕ
suffix "子" → e	孩子 hái zi → hái e
w+a, ai, ei, an, en, ang, eng → v+a, ai, ei, an, en, ang, eng wu and wo don't change	晚飯 wǎn fàn → vǎn fàn
numeral "二" → àr	王二小 wáng èr xiǎo → váng àr xiǎo
瑞 → suèi 崖 → ái	瑞士 rùi shì → suèi si 泡崖 pào yá → pào ái
n+i,iang,ie,ian,iao,iu,in,ing,ü,üe → gn+i,iang,ie,ian,iao,iu,in,ing,ü,üe nu doesn't change alveolar nasal shifted to palatal before front vowels/glides	你 nǐ → gnǐ 虐 nüè → gnüè
z, c, s+en[ən], eng[əŋ] → z, c, s+en[ɿn], eng[ɿŋ] other consonants+en, eng don't change	森 sēn[sən] → sēn[sɿn]

=== Syllables that don't exist in standard Mandarin ===
- biǎng (de) (It is actually the liaison of bì(婢) yăng(养), almost always followed by an unvoiced de(的)) -【Adjective】: literally means "raised by a maidservant";【Noun】a highly derogatory term to express despise or anger toward certain individual(s).
- piǎ (This Chinese character is not made out yet.) -【Verb】to ridicule sb.

=== Consonants ===
==== Basic consonants ====
b [ p ]	p [ pʰ ]	m [ m ]	f [ f ]	v [ v ]
d [ t ]	t [ tʰ ]	n [ n ]		l [ l ]
g [ k ]	k [ kʰ ]		h [ x ]	
j [ ʨ ]	q [ ʨʰ ]	gn [ ɲ ]	x [ ɕ ]	
z [ ʦ ]	c [ ʦʰ ]		s [ s ]	

=== Vowels ===
==== Basic vowels ====
a [ ä ]	ai [ aɪ ]	ao [ ɑʊ ]	an [ an ]	ang [ ɑŋ ]
o [ ǫ ]		ou [ ǫʊ ]		ong [ ʊŋ ]
e/ê [ ɤ ][ ɛ ]	ei [ eɪ ]		en [ ən ][ ɿn ]	eng [ əŋ ][ ɿŋ ]
i/y [ i ][ ɿ ]		i_{o}u [ iǫʊ ]	in [ in ]	ing [ iŋ ]
u/w [ u ]	u_{e}i [ ueɪ ]		u_{e}n [ uən ]	
ü/yu [ y ]			ün [ yn ]	
m [ m ]		n [ n ]		ng [ ŋ ]

==== Compound vowels ====
ia [ iä ]	iai [ iaɪ ]	iao [ iɑʊ ]	ian [ iɛn ]	iang [ iɑŋ ]
				iong [ iʊŋ ]
ie [ iɛ ]				
ua [ uä ]	uai [ uaɪ ]		uan [ uan ]	uang [ uɔŋ ]
uo [ uǫ ]				
			üan [ yœ̜n ]	
üe [ yœ̜ ]				

- Dark red color means compound vowels; ai, ei, ao, ou, an, en, in, ün, ang, ong, eng, ing are as basic vowels.
- [ ɿ ] are apical vowels of zi, ci, si.
- m, n and ng are nasal vowels of independent syllables; there are also two syllables of "hm 噷" and "hng 哼".

==== Erizational vowels ====
Basic vowels	ai 蓋 an 碗 (i)an 邊	(ü)an 院	i 字 ei 輩 en 根	ü 魚	a 瓦	(i)e 碟	(ü)e 月	o 窩
Erizational vowels	ar [ aʅ ]	(ü)anr [ œ̜ʯ ]	er [ əʅ ]	ür [ yʯ ]	a'r [ äʅ ]	(i)e'r [ ɛʅ ]	(ü)e'r [ øʯ ]	or [ ǫʯ ]
Basic vowels	e 歌	u 肚	ao 包	ou 頭	ang 缸	(u)ang 光	ong 工	eng 燈
Erizational vowels	e'r [ ɤʅ ]	ur [ uʯ ]	ao'r [ ɑʊʯ ]	ou'r [ ǫʊʯ ]	angr [ ɑŋʅ̃ ]	(u)angr [ ɔŋʯ̃ ]	ongr [ ʊŋʯ̃ ]	engr [ əŋʅ̃ ]

- "瓦兒" and "碗兒" are different; "歌兒" and "根兒" are different, vowel of "根兒" is a kind of retroflex mid-central vowel.
- i of "zi, ci, si" is an apical vowel. After erizing, i turns into er, such as "事兒"ser4.
- The rule of i, u, ü combining with the erizational vowels is the same as the rule of those combining with the basic vowels, so the tabulation of this part is omitted.

=== Tones ===
Tones of Dalianian
Tone No.	1	2	3	4	5	6	Not marked
Dalian dialect	Yinping (LowMid falling)	Yangping (Middle rising)	Shangsheng (Middle concave)	Yinqu (HighMid falling)	Zhongqu (Middle level/Low rising)	Yangqu (Low falling)	Qingsheng
Dalian dialect	31	24	213	52	33/13	21	--
Beijing dialect	Yinping (High level)	Yangping (High rising)	Shangsheng (High concave)	Qusheng (High falling)			Qingsheng
Beijing dialect	55	35	214	51			--

In Dalianian,

- When Tone No.1 meets another Tone No.1 or Tone No.4 meets Tone No.1, usually the previous tone turns to Tone No.5 and the next tone doesn't change, like “家家戶戶”jia'r5-jia'r1-hur6-hur4, “駕崩”jia5-beng1.
- When Tone No.1 meets Tone No.4, usually the previous tone doesn't change and the next tone turns to Tone No.6, like “蟋蟀”xi1-suai6 or xi3-suar, “稀碎”xi1-sei6.
- When Tone No.4 meets another Tone No.4, usually the previous tone turns to Tone No.5 and the next tone turns to Tone No.6, like “畢恭畢敬”bi5-gongr1-bi5-jingr6, “客客氣氣”ke'r4-ke'r-qi5-qi6.
- Tone No.5 and Tone No.6 are not basic tones, but modulations.

== Vocabulary ==
Dalianian
Dalianian	Meaning	Dalianian	Meaning	Dalianian	Meaning	Dalianian	Meaning	Dalianian	Meaning
xiĕ	extremely	cháo'r	stupid / outdated	huǐ le	Oh, no!	bái hu	extemporaneous / to blatter	zuǒ suo	to waste
làng	coxcombry	biāo	foolish	kē'r le	can't help it	guán duō'r	always	dè se	flighty
shòu'r	piquant / Cool!	bài	don't	zī shi	natty	gniàn yang	show dissatisfaction tactfully	xián hu	not very gratified / to disdain
gān jing	Great!	vā'r	low level	zhāngr chengr	capable	hǎ hu	dress down	bú lǎi xuán	understated
kāi le	expressing dissatisfaction	xuán le	too many	sá me	peep	gè yang	disgusting	cī máo'r juē dìng	rude

== Grammar ==
According to the predicate structure analysis method of the British linguists Ricci, the Dalian dialect is the same as English and Mandarin - the sentence is generally composed of S+V+O, that is subject + predicate + object of the order, but there are special circumstances, such as the older generation of Dalian people will say "Jiǎ zóu ba! Jiǎ zóu ba! (家走吧!家走吧!)" instead of "Húi jiā ba! Húi jiā ba! (回家吧!回家吧!)". At this time, the sentence is not S+V+O, but S+O+V, that is, subject + object + predicate.

- jiā means "home".
- zǒu means "go".
- húi means "go back to".
- ba means a kind of mood which means "to persuade" or "to urge".

== Others ==
=== Classification ===
- The dialect of Zhongshan District, Xigang District, Shahekou District, Ganjingzi District, Lüshunkou District and Wafangdian City of Dalian belongs to Da-Wa Subarea;
- The dialect of Jinzhou District, Pulandian District, Zhuanghe City and Changhai County of Dalian belongs to Chang-Zhuang Subarea.

=== Distribution ===
- Peninsulas: Shandong Peninsula, Liaodong Peninsula.
- Borders: Yalu River, Ussuri River.
