= Sisheng =

Sisheng may refer to:

- Four tones of modern Mandarin Chinese
- Four tones of Middle Chinese, a separate set of four historical tones following the loss of Chinese's terminal consonants
- Sisheng, Chinese era name used by Emperor Zhongzong of Tang during his first reign (683–684)
