= Literary and colloquial readings =

Differing pronunciation of Chinese characters

- Traditional Chinese: 文白異讀
- Simplified Chinese: 文白异读
Transcriptions
Standard Mandarin
- Hanyu Pinyin: wénbái yìdú
- Wade–Giles: wen^{2}-pai^{2} yi^{4}-du^{2}
- IPA: [wə̌npǎɪ îtǔ]
Yue: Cantonese
- Yale Romanization: màhnbaahk yihduhk
- Jyutping: man4 baak6 ji6 duk6
Southern Min
- Hokkien POJ: bûn-pe̍k ī-tho̍k
- Tâi-lô: bûn-pi̍k ī-tho̍k

Differing literary and colloquial readings for certain Chinese characters are a common feature of many Chinese varieties, and the reading distinctions for these linguistic doublets often typify a dialect group. Literary readings (文读; 文讀; wéndú) are usually used in loanwords, geographic and personal names, literary works such as poetry, and in formal contexts, while colloquial readings (白读; 白讀; báidú) are used in everyday vernacular speech.

For example, the character for 'white' (白) is normally read with the colloquial pronunciation bái [pǎɪ] in Standard Chinese, but can also have the literary reading bó [pwǒ] in names or in some formal or historical contexts. This example is particularly well known due to its effect on the modern pronunciations "Bo Juyi" and "Li Bo" for the names of the Tang dynasty (618–907) poets Bai Juyi and Li Bai.

The differing pronunciations have led linguists to explore the strata of Sinitic languages, as such differences reflect a history of dialect interchange and the influence of formal education and instruction on various regions in China. Colloquial readings are generally considered to represent a substratum, while their literary counterparts are considered a superstratum.

== Characteristics ==
Colloquial readings typically reflect the native phonology of a given Chinese variety, while literary readings typically originate from other Chinese varieties, typically more prestigious varieties. Colloquial readings are usually older, resembling the sound systems described by old rime dictionaries like the Guangyun, whereas literary readings are often closer to the phonology of newer sound systems. In certain Mandarin and Wu dialects, many literary readings are the result of influence from Nanjing Mandarin or Beijing Mandarin during the Ming and Qing dynasties.

Formal education and discourse usually use past prestigious varieties, so formal words usually use literary readings. Although the phonology of the Chinese variety in which this occurred did not entirely match that of the prestige variety, literary readings tended to evolve toward the prestige variety. Also, neologisms usually use the pronunciation of prestigious varieties. Colloquial readings are usually used in informal settings because their usage in formal settings has been supplanted by the readings of the prestige varieties. Literary readings are used in high-status society and for reading texts, as well as certain performative arts such as Pingtan. Traditional education in Taiwan involved students learning to recite Classical Chinese text in the literary pronunciation, followed by the teacher explaining the same text in the colloquial reading, either Quanzhou speech, Zhangzhou speech or Hakka. In addition, official documents were also read out in literary pronunciation.

Because of this, the frequency of literary readings in a Chinese variety reflects its history and status. For example, before the promotion of Standard Chinese (based on the Beijing dialect of Mandarin), the Central Plains Mandarin of the Central Plain had few literary readings, but they now have literary readings that resemble the phonology of Modern Standard Chinese. On the other hand, the relatively influential Beijing and Guangzhou dialects have fewer literary readings than other varieties.

Some Chinese varieties may have many instances of foreign readings replacing native readings, forming multiple sets of literary and colloquial readings. A newer literary reading may replace an older literary reading, and the older literary reading may become disused or become a new colloquial reading. Sometimes literary and colloquial readings of the same character have different meanings.

An analogous phenomenon exists to a much more significant degree in Japanese, where individual kanji generally have two common readings—the newer borrowed, more formal Sino-Japanese on'yomi, and the older native, more colloquial kun'yomi. Unlike in Chinese varieties, where readings are usually genetically related, in Japanese the borrowed readings are unrelated to the native readings. Furthermore, many kanji in fact have several on'yomi, reflecting borrowings at different periods – these multiple borrowings are generally doublets or triplets, and are sometimes quite distant in time. These readings are generally used in particular contexts, such as readings for Buddhist terms, many of which were earlier go-on borrowings.

== Behavior in Chinese ==
=== Cantonese ===
Cantonese literary and colloquial readings have quite regular relationships. A character's meaning is often different depending on whether it is read with a colloquial or literary reading.

Initials

- colloquial 'heavy labial' (重脣, bilabial) initials /p/ and /pʰ/ correspond to literary 'light labial' (輕脣, labiodental) initial /f/
- colloquial /ŋ/ initial (疑母) correspond to literary /j/ initial (以母)

Rimes

- colloquial readings with [ɛː] nuclei correspond to literary [ɪ] and [iː] nuclei
- colloquial [aː] correspond to literary [ɐ]
- colloquial [ɐi] correspond to literary [i]
- colloquial [œː] correspond to literary [ɔː]; of course, not all colloquial readings with a certain nucleus correspond to literary readings with another nucleus

Tones

- some Middle Chinese 'full-muddy (i.e. voiced obstruent) rising-tone' (全濁上聲) words now have colloquial 'subclear' (次清, aspirated) initials along with preserved 'muddy rising' (濁上) tone called yang rising (陽上), while literary initials are 'full-clear' (全清, tenuis) and merge into 'muddy departing' (濁去) tone called yang departing (陽去), but if they now have fricative or approximant initials then they have no aspiration distinction. Most other varieties share this sound change process to varying degrees which is called '(full) muddy rising become departing' ((全)濁上變去).

Examples:

Chinese character	Middle Chinese^{1}	Colloquial reading			Literary reading		
Chinese character	Middle Chinese^{1}	IPA	Jyutping	Meaning	IPA	Jyutping	Meaning
*labial: heavy labial [p(ʰ)] vs light labial [f]
浮	bjuw	pʰou˨˩	pou4	(of a person) show up, appear	fɐu˨˩	fau4	float
婦	bjuwX	pʰou˩˧	pou5	bride	fu˩˧	fu5	woman
埠		pou˨꜔꜒	bou6*2	the original character in Sham Shui Po (埠→埗)	fɐu˨	fau6	pier, dock, port
*'疑' initial: [ŋ] vs [j]
吟	ngim	ŋɐm˨˩	ngam4	groan	jɐm˨˩	jam4	recite, chant
研	ngen	ŋan˨˩	ngaan4	grind	jin˨˩	jin4	research
*'梗' rime group: [ɛːŋ], [ɛːk] vs [ɪŋ], [ɪk]
精	tsjeng	tsɛːŋ˥	zeng1	clever	tsɪŋ˥	zing1	spirit
正	tsyengH	tsɛːŋ˧	zeng3	correct, good	tsɪŋ˧	zing3	correct
淨	dzjengH	tsɛːŋ˨	zeng6	clean	tsɪŋ˨	zing6	clean
驚	kjaeng	kɛːŋ˥	geng1	be afraid	kɪŋ˥	ging1	frighten
平	bjaeng	pʰɛːŋ˨˩	peng4	inexpensive	pʰɪŋ˨˩	ping4	flat
青	tsheng	tsʰɛːŋ˥	ceng1	blue/green, pale	tsʰɪŋ˥	cing1	blue/green
惜	sjek	sɛːk˧	sek3	cherish, (v.) kiss	sɪk˥	sik1	lament
*'梗' rime group: [aːŋ], [aːk] vs [ɐŋ], [ɐk]
生	sraeng	saːŋ˥	saang1	raw, (honorific name suffix)	sɐŋ˥	sang1	(v.) live, person
牲	sraeng	saːŋ˥	saang1	livestock	sɐŋ˥	sang1	livestock
*'果' rime group: [œː] vs [ɔː]
多	ta	tœ˥	doe1	just this much	tɔ˥	do1	many, more
朵	twaX	tœ˧˥	doe2	(classifier for flowers, clouds, etc.)	tɔ˧˥	do2	name, nickname, title
墮	dwaX	tœ˨	doe6	droopy, saggy	tɔ˨	do6	(v.) fall, sink
*full-muddy rising-tone: (aspirated) yang rising vs (tenuis) yang departing
被	bjeX	pʰei˩˧	pei5	blanket	pei˨	bei6	passive voice
淡	damX	tʰam˩˧	taam5	bland, tasteless	tam˨	daam6	off-season
斷	dwanX	tʰyn˩˧	tyun5	(v.) break	tyn˨	dyun6	(v.) decide, determine
坐	dzwaX	tsʰɔ˩˧	co5	(v.) sit	tsɔ˨	zo6	compound with 骨 (bone) in 坐骨 (ischium)
上	dzyangX	sœŋ˩˧	soeng5	go up, board (vehicles)	sœŋ˨	soeng6	up there, previous
近	gj+nX	kʰɐn˩˧	kan5	near	kɐn˨	gan6	near (in nearsightedness)
*others
挾	hep	kɛːp˨	gep6	clamp	kiːp˨	gip6	clamp
掉	dewH	tɛːu˨	deu6	discard	tiːu˨	diu6	turn, discard
來	loj	lɐi˨˩	lai4	come	lɔːi˨˩	loi4	come
使	sriX	sɐi˧˥	sai2	use	siː˧˥	si2	(v.) cause, envoy
Notes: 1. Middle Chinese transcription in Baxter's transcription for Middle Chinese. Middle Chinese tones in terms of level (no tone), rising (-X), departing (-H), and entering (-p, -t, -k) are given.

=== Hakka ===
The literary readings in Hakka in most rime groups are based on Mandarin/Northern Chinese pronunciations.

Examples:

Chinese character	Literary reading	Colloquial reading
生	sɛn˦	saŋ˦
弟	tʰi˥˧	tʰɛ˦/tʰai˦
苦	kʰu˧˩	fu˧˩
肥	fui˧˥	pʰui˧˥
惜	sit˩	siak˩
正	tʃin˥˧/tʃən˥˧	tʃaŋ˥˧

=== Mandarin ===
Literary readings in modern Standard Chinese are usually native pronunciations more conservative than colloquial readings. This is because they reflect readings from before Beijing was the capital, e.g. from the Ming dynasty. Most instances where there are different literary and colloquial readings occur with characters that have entering tones. Among those are primarily literary readings that have not been adopted into the Beijing dialect before the Yuan dynasty. Colloquial readings of other regions have also been adopted into the Beijing dialect, a major difference being that literary readings are usually adopted with the colloquial readings. Some of the differences between the Standard Chinese of Taiwan and the mainland are due to the fact that Putonghua tends to adopt colloquial readings for a character while Guoyu tends to adopt a literary reading.

Examples of literary readings adopted into the Beijing dialect:

Chinese character	Middle Chinese^{1}	Literary reading		Colloquial reading	
Chinese character	Middle Chinese^{1}	IPA	Pinyin	IPA	Pinyin
黑	hək^{入}	xɤ˥˩	hè	xei˥	hēi
白	bɣæk^{入}	pwɔ˧˥	bó	pai˧˥	bái
薄	bwɑk^{入}	pwɔ˧˥	bó	pɑʊ˧˥	báo
剝	pɣʌk^{入}	pwɔ˥	bō	pɑʊ˥	bāo
給	kɣiɪp^{入}	tɕi˨˩˦	jǐ	kei˨˩˦	gěi
殼	kʰɣʌk^{入}	tɕʰɥɛ˥˩	què	tɕʰjɑʊ˥˩	qiào
露	luo^{去}	lu˥˩	lù	lɤʊ˥˩	lòu
六	lɨuk^{入}	lu˥˩	lù	ljɤʊ˥˩	liù
熟	dʑɨuk^{入}	ʂu˧˥	shú	ʂɤʊ˧˥	shóu
色	ʃɨk^{入}	sɤ˥˩	sè	ʂai˨˩˦	shǎi
削	sɨɐk^{入}	ɕɥɛ˥	xuē	ɕjɑʊ˥	xiāo
角	kɣʌk^{入}	tɕɥɛ˧˥	jué	tɕjɑʊ˨˩˦	jiǎo
血	hwet^{入}	ɕɥɛ˥˩	xuè	ɕjɛ˨˩˦	xiě
Notes: 1. Middle Chinese reconstruction according to Zhengzhang Shangfang. Middle Chinese tones in terms of level (平), rising (上), departing (去), and entering (入) are given.

Examples of colloquial readings adopted into the Beijing dialect:

Chinese character	Middle Chinese^{1}	Literary reading		Colloquial reading	
Chinese character	Middle Chinese^{1}	IPA	Pinyin	IPA	Pinyin
港	kɣʌŋ^{上}	tɕjɑŋ˨˩˦	jiǎng^{2}	kɑŋ˨˩˦	gǎng
癌	ŋam^{平}	jɛn˧˥	yán	ai˧˥	ái
殼	kʰɣʌk^{入}	t͡ɕʰɥɛ˥˩ / t͡ɕʰjɑʊ̯˥˩	què / qiào	kʰɤ˧˥	ké
Notes: 1. Middle Chinese reconstruction according to Zhengzhang Shangfang. Middle Chinese tones in terms of level (平), rising (上), departing (去), and entering (入) are given.; 2. 港's only attested reading is gǎng; **jiǎng is purely hypothetical.

=== Sichuanese ===
In Sichuanese Mandarin, colloquial readings tend to resemble Ba-Shu Chinese or southern Proto-Mandarin during the Ming, while literary readings tend to resemble modern standard Mandarin. For example, in the Yaoling dialect the colloquial reading of 物 'things' is [væʔ], which is very similar to its pronunciation of Ba-Shu Chinese in the Song dynasty (960–1279). Meanwhile, its literary reading, [voʔ], is relatively similar to the standard Mandarin pronunciation [u]. The table below shows some Chinese characters with both literary and colloquial readings in Sichuanese.

Example	Colloquial reading	Literary reading	Meaning	Standard Chinese pronunciation
在	tɛ	tsai	at	tsai
提	tia	tʰi	lift	tʰi
去	tɕʰie	tɕʰy	go	tɕʰy
锯	kɛ	tɕy	cut	tɕy
下	xa	ɕia	down	ɕia
横	xuan	xuən	across	xəŋ
严	ŋan	ȵian	stricked	ian
鼠	suei	su	rat	ʂu
大	tʰai	ta	big	ta
主	toŋ	tsu	master	tʂu

=== Wu ===
In the northern Wu-speaking region, the main sources of literary readings are the Beijing and Nanjing dialects during the Ming and Qing dynasties, and modern Standard Chinese. In the southern Wu-speaking region, literary readings tend to be adopted from the Hangzhou dialect. Colloquial readings tend to reflect an older sound system.

Not all Wu dialects behave the same way. Some have more instances of discrepancies between literary and colloquial readings than others. For example, the character 魏 had a [ŋ] initial in Middle Chinese, and in literary readings, there is a null initial. In colloquial readings it is pronounced /ŋuɛ/ in Songjiang. About 100 years ago, it was pronounced /ŋuɛ/ in Suzhou and Shanghai, and now it is /uɛ/.

Some pairs of literary and colloquial readings are interchangeable in all cases, such as in the words 吳淞 and 松江. Some must be read in one particular reading. For example, 人民 must be read using the literary reading, /zəɲmiɲ/, and 人命 must be read using the colloquial reading, /ɲiɲmiɲ/. Some differences in reading for the same characters have different meanings, such as 巴結, using the colloquial reading /pʊtɕɪʔ/ means 'make great effort', and using the literary reading /pɑtɕɪʔ/ means 'get a desired outcome'. Some readings are almost never used, such as colloquial /ŋ̍/ for 吳 and literary /tɕiɑ̃/ for 江.

Examples:

Chinese character	Literary reading	Colloquial reading
生	/səɲ/ in 生物	/sɑ̃/ in 生菜
人	/zəɲ/ in 人民	/ɲiɲ/ in 大人
大	/dɑ/ in 大饼	/dɯ/ in 大人
物	/vəʔ/ in 事物	/məʔ/ in 物事
家	/tɕia/ in 家庭	/kɑ/ in 家生

=== Min Nan ===
Min languages, which include Taiwanese Hokkien, separate reading pronunciations (讀音) from spoken pronunciations (語音) and explications (解說). Hokkien dictionaries in Taiwan often differentiate between such character readings with prefixes for literary readings and colloquial readings 文 and 白, respectively.

Typically, literary readings in Hokkien come from the stratum of linguistic influence originating from the Tang dynasty (618–907 CE) prestige dialect of Chang'an (modern day Xi'an).

The following examples in Pe̍h-oē-jī show differences in character readings in Taiwanese Hokkien:

Chinese character	Reading pronunciations	Spoken pronunciations / ^{†}explications	English
白	pe̍k	pe̍h	white
面	biān	bīn	face
書	su	chu	book
生	seng	seⁿ / siⁿ	student
不	put	m̄^{†}	not
返	hóan	tńg^{†}	return
學	ha̍k	o̍h	to study
人	jîn / lîn	lâng^{†}	person
少	siàu	chió	few
轉	chóan	tńg	to turn

In addition, some characters have multiple and unrelated pronunciations, adapted to represent Hokkien words. For example, the Hokkien word bah ('meat') is often written with the character 肉, which has etymologically unrelated colloquial and literary readings he̍k and jio̍k, respectively).

=== Min Dong ===
In the Fuzhou dialect of Min Dong, literary readings are mainly used in formal phrases and words derived from the written language, while the colloquial ones are used in more colloquial phrases. Phonologically, a large range of phonemes can differ between the character's two readings: in tone, final, initial, or any and all of these features.

The following table uses Foochow Romanized as well as IPA for some of the major differences in readings.

Character	Literary			Colloquial		
Character	Literary reading	Phrase	Meaning	Colloquial reading	Phrase	Meaning
行	hèng [heiŋ˥˧]	行李 hèng-lī	luggage	giàng [kjaŋ˥˧]	行墿 giàng-duô	to walk
生	sĕng [seiŋ˥]	生態 sĕng-tái	zoology, ecology	săng [saŋ˥]	生囝 săng-giāng	childbearing
江	gŏng [kouŋ˥]	江蘇 Gŏng-sŭ	Jiangsu	gĕ̤ng [køyŋ˥]	閩江 Mìng-gĕ̤ng	Min River
百	báik [paiʔ˨˦]	百科 báik-kuŏ	encyclopedical	báh [paʔ˨˦]	百姓 báh-sáng	common people
飛	hĭ [hi˥]	飛機 hĭ-gĭ	aeroplane	buŏi [pwi˥]	飛鳥 buŏi-cēu	flying birds
寒	hàng [haŋ˥˧]	寒食 Hàng-sĭk	Cold Food Festival	gàng [kaŋ˥˧]	天寒 tiĕng gàng	cold, freezing
廈	hâ [ha˨˦˨]	大廈 dâi-hâ	mansion	â [a˨˦˨]	廈門 Â-muòng	Amoy

=== Gan ===
The following are examples of variations between literary and colloquial readings of Chinese characters in Gan Chinese.

Chinese character	Literary reading	Colloquial reading
生	/sɛn/ as in 學生 'student'	/saŋ/ as in 出生 'be born'
軟	/lon/ as in 微軟 'Microsoft'	/ɲion˧/ as in 軟骨 'cartilage'
青	/tɕʰin/ as in 青春 'youth'	/tɕʰiaŋ/ as in 青菜 'vegetables'
望	/uɔŋ/ as in 看望 'visit'	/mɔŋ/ as in 望相 'look'

== See also ==
- Onyomi
- Reconstructions of Old Chinese, for a more detailed study on historical Chinese pronunciation
- Sino-Japanese vocabulary
- Sino-Korean vocabulary
- Sino-Vietnamese vocabulary#Monosyllabic loanwords
- Sino-Xenic pronunciations
