= Jiaoliao people =

胶辽民系

Regions with significant populations
- China (Shandong Peninsula and Liaodong Peninsula)

Languages
- Jiaoliao Chinese as primary, Standard Chinese as secondary)

Religion
- Chinese folk religion, Taoism, Buddhism, Christianity, Atheism

Jiaoliao people (Chinese: 胶辽民系; pinyin: Jiāoliáorén), also referred to as the Jiaoliao Han people (Chinese: 胶辽汉人; pinyin: Jiāoliáo Hànrén), are a Han Chinese ethnolinguistic group primarily inhabiting the Jiaodong Peninsula in Shandong Province and Liaodong Peninsula in Liaoning Province. They are distinguished by their use of Jiaoliao Mandarin, with unique phonological features. The Jiaoliao people emerged as a distinct regional group through centuries of cultural exchange across the Bohai Sea when maritime trade and population movement intensified between Shandong and Liaoning regions. This led to a blending of customs and dialects, forming a coherent regional identity.

Jiaoliao people moved to China's Liaodong peninsula. Despite regional variation, they share strong culinary traditions, sea-based livelihoods, and linguistic characteristics centered around Jiaoliao Mandarin.

The Jiaoliao identity is less commonly recognized than other Han subgroups, but remains notable in linguistic, historical, and cultural scholarship on northern coastal China.
