= Regret (Mai Hoshimura song) =

Single by Mai Hoshimura

from the album My Life
- B-side: "Love Tuning", "Sakura Biyori x Kotaro Oshio"
- Released: June 4, 2008
- Genre: J-Pop
- Length: 18:56
- Label: SME Records
- Songwriter(s): Mai Hoshimura

Mai Hoshimura singles chronology
"Kakegae no Nai Hito e" (2007)	"Regret" (2008)	"Hikari" (2008)

"Regret" is the 13th single by Japanese singer Mai Hoshimura, released on June 4, 2008, on the SMEJ label. The title track was used as the seventh ending theme for the anime series D.Gray-man. The single peaked at number 30 and charted for four weeks in the Oricon charts. The coupling "Sakura Biyori x Kotaro Oshio" is an acoustic version of her previous-released song "Sakura Biyori".

This single's catalog number is SECL-643.

== Track listing ==
1. "Regret"
  Composition/Lyrics: Mai Hoshimura
  Arrangement: Hideyuki Daichi Suzuki
2. "Love Tuning"
  Composition/Lyrics: Mai Hoshimura
  Arrangement: SatoriShiraishi
3. "Sakura Biyori x Kotaro Oshio"
  Composition/Lyrics: Mai Hoshimura
  Arrangement: Kotaro Oshio
4. "Regret (D.Gray-man Ending ver.)"
5. "Regret" (instrumental)
