= Mai Hoshimura =

Japanese Singer-songwriter (born 1981)

Mai Hoshimura 星村 麻衣
- Also known as: Barefoot Piano Girl
- Born: Hoshimura Mai; April 18, 1981 (age 45); Matsue, Shimane, Japan
- Genres: Japanese Pop
- Occupations: Singer-songwriter; Pianist
- Instrument: Piano
- Years active: 2002–present
- Labels: Sony Music Associated Record (2002–2006); SME Records (2007 – May 2009); Heart-Voice Records (2010–present)
- Website: www.hoshimuramai.jp

Mai Hoshimura (星村 麻衣, Hoshimura Mai; born April 18, 1981, in Matsue, Shimane) is a Japanese pop singer-songwriter and pianist.

On May 31, 2009, her contract with Sony ended.

== Biography ==
Mai Hoshimura was born on April 18, 1981, in Matsue, Shimane. Hoshimura began to learn to play the piano at the age of four. Her mother, a teacher, had hoped she would become a classical pianist, but it was her father; also a teacher, who had influenced her with popular music. Her 2007 song "Sakura Biyori" was the tenth ending theme of the anime Bleach. Her single "Regret" was the seventh ending song of the anime D. Gray-man. Her song "Merry Go Round" was used as the fifth ending theme for the anime Yakitate!! Japan.

== Discography ==
=== Albums ===
Title	Release date	Oricon album chart ranking	Singles
Soup	July 9, 2003	30	"Stay With You", "Cherish", "Get Happy"
Joyful	January 25, 2006	70	"Believer", "Himawari", "Melodea", "Every", "Sunao ni Narenai", "Merry Go Round"
My Life	September 17, 2008	20	"Sakura Biyori", "Shunkan, Strobe.", "Kakegae no Nai Hito e", "Regret", "Hikari"
Evergreen	April 18, 2012	—	"Doki Doki / You"

=== Best album ===
- Piano & Best

=== Singles ===
Title	Release date	Oricon single chart ranking	Album
"Natsuiro no Canvas"	July 24, 2002	—	
"Stay With You"	October 23, 2002	92	Soup
"Cherish"	February 19, 2003	125	Soup
"Get Happy"	May 14, 2003	24	Soup
"Believer"	December 3, 2003	133	Joyful
"Himawari"	June 9, 2004	42	Joyful
"Melodea"	March 16, 2005	122	Joyful
"Every"	May 25, 2005	32	Joyful
"Sunao ni Narenai"	September 28, 2005	98	Joyful
"Merry Go Round"	January 11, 2006	85	Joyful
"Sakura Biyori"	March 7, 2007	20	My Life
"Shunkan, Strobe."	May 30, 2007	99	My Life
"Kakegae no Nai Hito e"	November 14, 2007	111	My Life
"Regret"	June 4, 2008	30	My Life
"Hikari"	August 20, 2008	14	My Life
"Ichibanboshi"	March 10, 2010	186	
"Candy"	July 29, 2010	—	
"Doki Doki / You"	June 8, 2011	—	Evergreen
