= Shimata Station =

Railway station in Hikari, Yamaguchi Prefecture, Japan

Shimata Station 島田駅
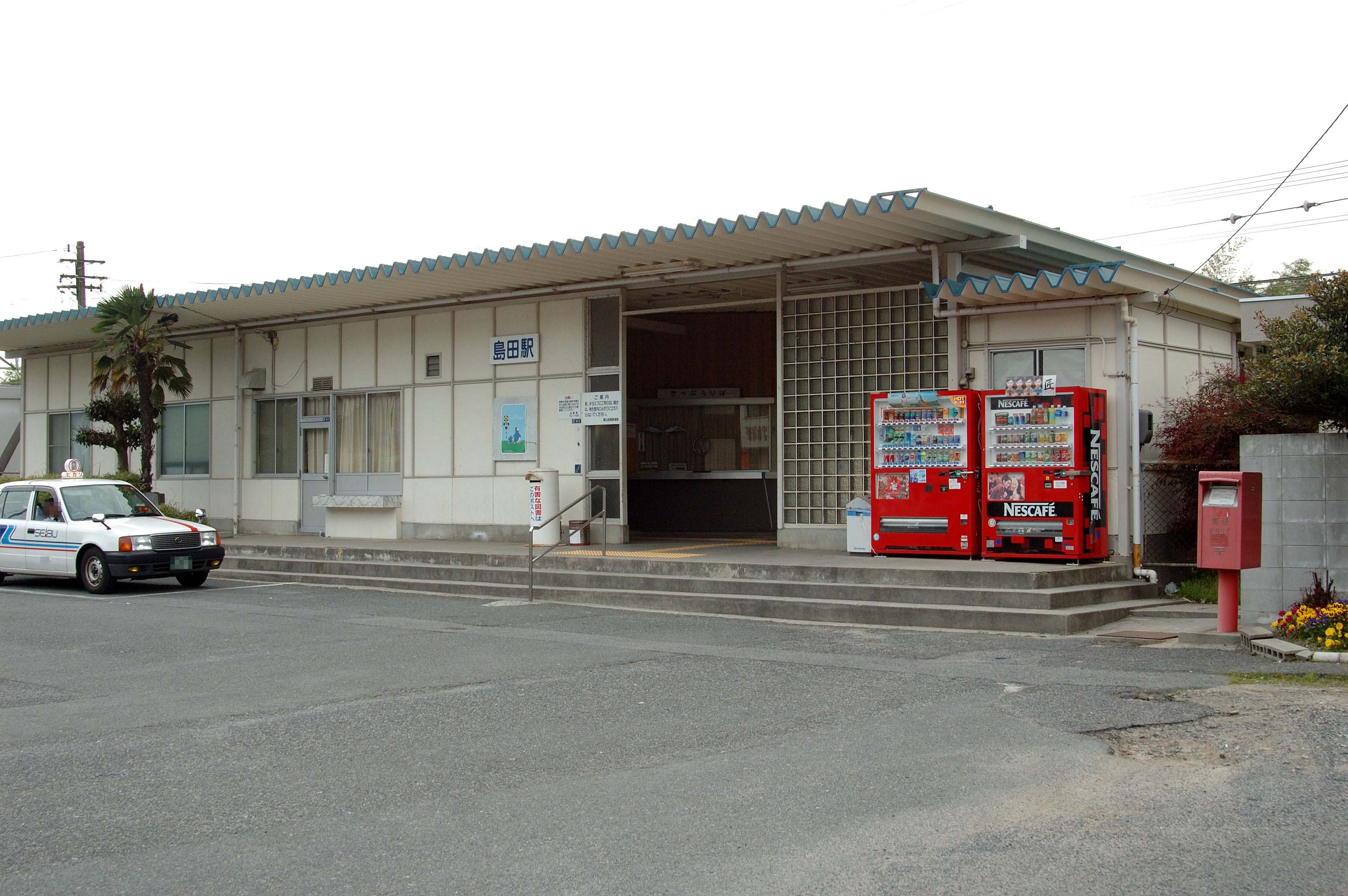
- Shimata Station in April 2006

General information
- Location: 4-chōme-8 Kamishimata, Hikari-shi, Yamaguchi-ken 743-0065; Japan
- Coordinates: 33°59′25.4″N 131°57′39.4″E
- Owner: West Japan Railway Company
- Operator: West Japan Railway Company
- Line: San'yō Line
- Distance: 395.9 km (246.0 miles) from Kobe
- Platforms: 2 side platforms
- Tracks: 3
- Connections: Bus stop

Construction
- Accessible: Yes

Other information
- Status: Unstaffed
- Website: Official website

History
- Opened: 25 September 1897; 128 years ago

Passengers
- FY2022: 417

Services
Preceding station	JR West	Following station
Hikari towards Shimonoseki	San'yō Line Local	Iwata towards Iwakuni
Location
- Location within Yamaguchi Prefecture Location within Japan

Shimata Station (島田駅, Shimata-eki) is a passenger railway station located in the city of Hikari, Yamaguchi Prefecture, Japan. It is operated by the West Japan Railway Company (JR West). The station is located in the rural northern part of the Shimata area in Hikari, on the north side of the city's territory.

== Lines ==
Shimata Station is served by the JR West Sanyō Main Line, and is located 395.9 kilometers from the terminus of the line at Kobe.

== Station layout ==
The station consists of two opposed side platforms connected by a footbridge. In between the two tracks there is a third track which connects to the other two, but is currently unused. The station is unattended.

== Platforms ==
1	■ San'yō Line	for Tokuyama and Hōfu
2	■ San'yō Line	for Yanai and Iwakuni

== History ==
Shimata Station was opened on 25 September 1897 as a station on the San'yo Railway with the opening of the extension from Hiroshima to Tokuyama. The San'yo Railway was railway nationalized in 1906 and the line renamed the San'yo Main Line in 1909.. With the privatization of the Japan National Railway (JNR) on 1 April 1987, the station came under the aegis of the West Japan railway Company (JR West).

== Passenger statistics ==
In fiscal 2022, the station was used by an average of 417 passengers daily.

== Surrounding area ==
- Hikari City Kamishimada Elementary School
- Hikari City Mitsui Elementary School
- Hikari City Suo Elementary School

== See also ==
- List of railway stations in Japan
