= Iwata Station =

Iwata Station is the name of two train stations in Japan:

- Iwata Station (Shizuoka) (磐田駅)
- Iwata Station (Yamaguchi) (岩田駅)
