= Kudamatsu Station =

Railway station in Kudamatsu, Yamaguchi Prefecture, Japan

Kudamatsu Station 下松駅
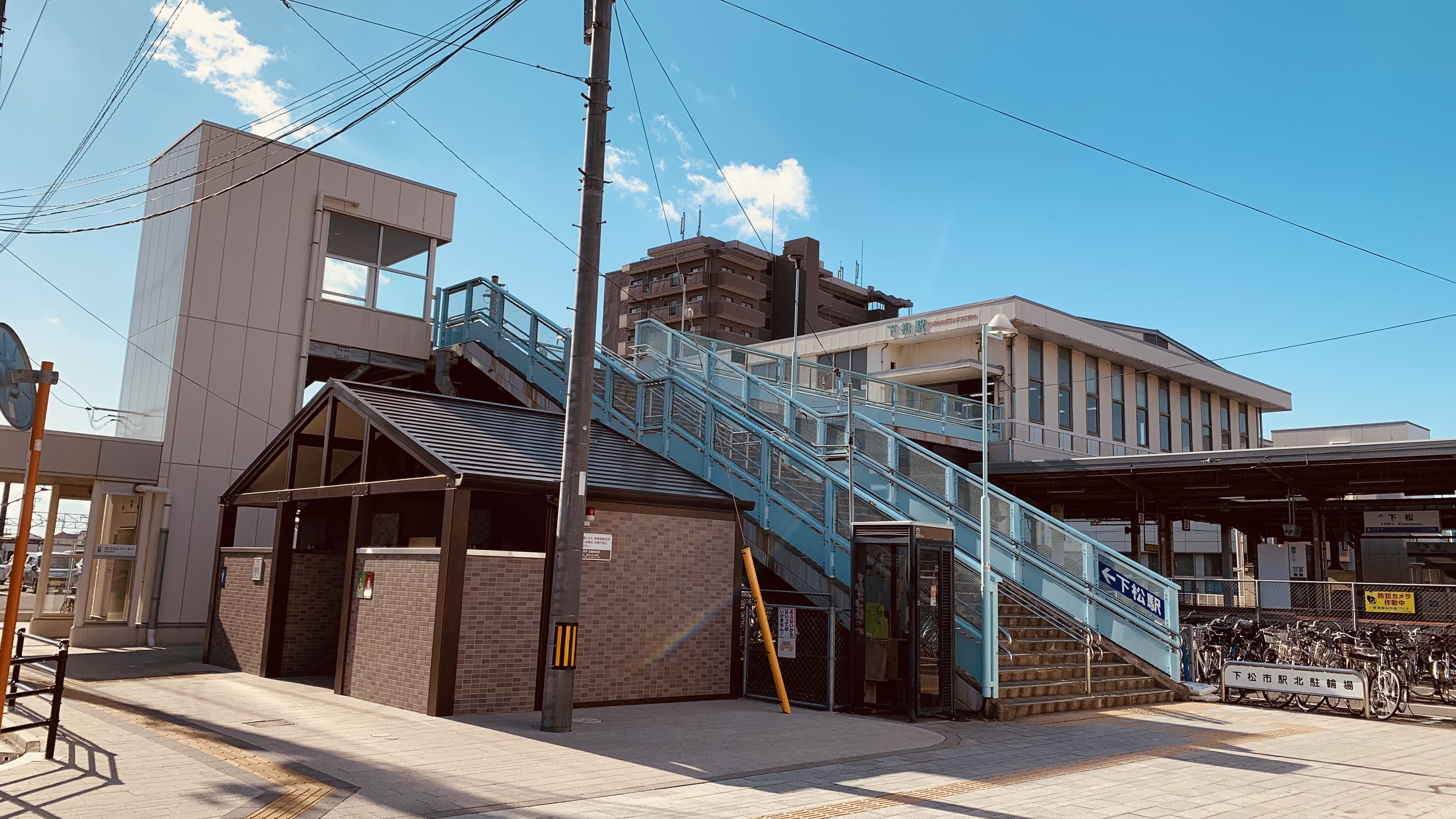
- Kudamatsu Station in February 2022

General information
- Location: 1 Chome-10-1 Ekiminami, Kudamatsu-shi, Yamaguchi-ken 744-0007; Japan
- Coordinates: 34°0′31.5″N 131°52′4.7″E
- Owner: West Japan Railway Company
- Operator: West Japan Railway Company
- Line: San'yō Line
- Distance: 406.9 km (252.8 miles) from Kobe
- Platforms: 1 side + 1 island platform
- Tracks: 2
- Connections: Bus stop

Construction
- Structure type: Elevated
- Accessible: Yes

Other information
- Status: Staffed
- Website: Official website

History
- Opened: 25 September 1897; 128 years ago

Passengers
- FY2022: 2042

Services
Preceding station	JR West	Following station
Kushigahama towards Shimonoseki	San'yō Line Local	Hikari towards Iwakuni
Location
- Location within Yamaguchi Prefecture Location within Japan

Kudamatsu Station (下松駅, Kudamatsu-eki) is a passenger railway station located in the city of Kudamatsu, Yamaguchi Prefecture, Japan. It is operated by the West Japan Railway Company (JR West).

== Lines ==
Kudamatsu Station is served by the JR West Sanyō Main Line, and is located 406.9 kilometers from the terminus of the line at Kobe.

== Station layout ==
The station consists of one side platform and one island platform connected by an elevated station building. The station is staffed.

== Platforms ==
1	■ San'yō Line	for Tokuyama, Hōfu and Shimonoseki
2, 3	■ San'yō Line	for Yanai, Iwakuni and Hiroshima

== History ==
Kudamatsu Station was opened on 25 September 1897 as a station on the San'yo Railway with the opening of the extension from Hiroshima to Tokuyama. The San'yo Railway was railway nationalized in 1906 and the line renamed the San'yo Main Line in 1909. The current station building completed in 1965. With the privatization of the Japan National Railway (JNR) on 1 April 1987, the station came under the aegis of the West Japan railway Company (JR West).

== Passenger statistics ==
In fiscal 2022, the station was used by an average of 2042 passengers daily.

== Surrounding area ==
- Kudamatsu Municipal Kudamatsu Elementary School
- Kudamatsu Junior High School
- Yamaguchi Prefectural Kudamatsu High School
- Yamaguchi Prefectural Kudamatsu Technical High School
- Kudamatsu City Hall

== See also ==
- List of railway stations in Japan
