= Weihai dialect =

Jiao-Liao dialect of Shandong, China

Weihai Dialect
- 威海话
- Native to: China
- Region: Shandong Peninsula
- Language family: Sino-Tibetan: Sinitic; Chinese; Mandarin; Jiao-Liao; Weihai Dialect

Language codes
- ISO 639-3: –
- Glottolog: None

Weihainese is a Jiao-Liao dialect of Mandarin spoken in and around the city of Weihai, in eastern Shandong province.

== Language variation ==
There are observable differences in how the dialect is spoken by younger and older generations. This is primarily due to the differences in education. The younger generation was and is educated in standard Mandarin, while the older generation is "hardly educated" due to the Cultural Revolution.

== Phonology ==
Like other Sino-Tibetan languages and dialects, Weihai is tonal.

=== Tones ===
Mandarin, and most dialects of Mandarin, has four tones. In Weihai, it is unclear if the tonal inventory matches standard Mandarin exactly or if the second tone follows the same pitch contour as the first tone (35, rising). The first tone in Weihai may also follow a 31 (low falling) contour rather than a 35 (rising) contour.

Dang and Fulop have found that high onset tones correlate to shorter stop releases.
