= Hikari (Mai Hoshimura song) =

Single by Mai Hoshimura

from the album My Life
- B-side: "Hello"
- Released: August 20, 2008
- Genre: J-Pop
- Length: 15:26
- Label: SME Records
- Songwriter(s): Mai Hoshimura, Shiraishi Satori

Mai Hoshimura singles chronology
"Regret" (2008)	"Hikari" (2008)	"Ichibanboshi" (2010)

Hikari is the 14th single by Japanese singer Mai Hoshimura. It was released on August 20, 2008 under the Sony Music Entertainment label. The title track was used as the theme song for the TBS TV drama Tomorrow: Hi wa Mata Noboru (Tomorrow〜陽はまたのぼる〜). The single peaked at number 14 in the Oricon Singles Chart selling 7,883 units on its first week. This is currently Mai Hoshimura's most successful single after her singles "Get Happy", "Sakura Biyori", and her previous single "Regret" which are her first three top 30 entries on the Oricon charts since she started her singing career.

This single's catalog number is SECL-672.

== Track listing ==
1. "ひかり / Hikari" - 5:22
  Composition/Lyrics: Mai Hoshimura, Shiraishi Satori
  Arrangement: Akira Senju
2. "Hello" - 4:44
  Composition/Lyrics: Mai Hoshimura
  Arrangement: Suzuki Daichi Hideyuki
3. "ひかり (Instrumental) / Hikari (Instrumental)" - 5:20

== Charts and sales ==
Oricon ranking (Weekly)	Sales
14	21,313
