= Qingdao dialect =

Mandarin dialect of Shandong, China

- 青岛方言，青岛话
- Native to: China
- Region: Qingdao
- Language family: Sino-Tibetan: Sinitic; Chinese; Mandarin; Jiao-Liao; Qingdao dialect

Language codes
- ISO 639-3: –
- Glottolog: None

The Qingdao dialect is the local dialect of the city of Qingdao and nearby towns, in China's Shandong Province.

Often characterized as requiring a "fat tongue", the Qingdao dialect often adds a /θ/ (English "th") sound to Mandarin's /ʂ/ (Pinyin "sh"), /ɕ/ (Pinyin "x"), and /s/ (Pinyin "s"). It also obliterates many Mandarin tones.

The basic, though not at all universal rule for converting Putonghua to the Qingdao dialect in the pinyin system is that a Mandarin 1 tone will become a Qingdao 3, 2 becomes a 4, 3 becomes 1 and 4 remains four. The Qingdao dialect's 1 tone (Mandarin's 3) also has a drawl to it. (the pinyin tones are: 1ˉ 2ˊ 3ˇ 4ˋ)

There are other phonetic changes from Mandarin to the Qingdao dialect:

- "gá •la" (蛤蜊), the local spicy clam dish, known in Mandarin as "gé •li"
- "hā pì jiū" (喝啤酒), drink beer
- "bài dào •dao" (别叨叨), meaning "no need to say more", but better understood to mean "shut up". Literally translated as "don't blather on".
- "Zhei Ba (窄巴), narrow (窄 is pronounced as Zhei in Qingdao dialect, different from Zhai in Putonghua)
- "Biao (彪)/ Chao (嘲)/ Ban Xian (半仙)/ Yu (愚), stupid

Nearly all Qingdao natives can understand Mandarin, but they will often respond in the Qingdao dialect without realizing they are doing so. The Qingdao dialect is not necessarily standardized throughout Qingdao. Different neighbourhoods, from Zhanshan to Xinjiazhuang to Maidao, will have their own variations.

Qingdao's urban dialect words originated between the 1940s and the 1960s. It has slowly developed its own "-isms" and slang over the years.

== See also ==
- Jiaoliao Mandarin
