= Guang (film) =

2019 Malaysian Mandarin-language drama film

- Theatrical poster for China release
- Directed by: Quek Shio Chuan
- Written by: Quek Shio Chuan
- Produced by: Sabrina Wong; Cora Yim; Angelin Ong; Lai Cheah Yee; Aron Koh
- Starring: Kyo Chen; Emily Chan; Ernest Chong
- Cinematography: Eric Yeong
- Edited by: Quek Shio Chuan
- Production company: Reservoir Production
- Distributed by: MM2 Entertainment
- Release date: 28 November 2018 (Malaysia)
- Running time: 88 minutes
- Country: Malaysia
- Language: Mandarin

Guang (Chinese: 光) is a 2018 Malaysian Mandarin-language drama film by Quek Shio Chuan. The film tells the story of an autistic young man with a hidden musical talent who struggles to find a job, and his relationship with his brother.

It was released to critical acclaim, and is released on 6 November 2020 in China. It is based on the 2011 short film of the same name by the director.

It was released in its home country Malaysia on 28 November 2018, and was subsequently released in Singapore, Hong Kong, and Taiwan.

== Synopsis ==
Wen Guang (Kyo Chen) is a young man who is autistic, he cannot focus and struggles to socialise with other people. His younger brother (Ernest Chong) wants him to look for a job so they can share their burden. As Wen Guang tries to find a job, he continues his secret passion, to collect and find for the perfect glasses and uncover a hidden talent. How will his story go?

== Cast ==
- Kyo Chen as Wen Guang (Guang)
  - Danny Low as young Guang
- Ernest Chong as younger brother (Didi)
  - Justin Ng as young Didi
- Emily Chan as Sue Ann
- Feon Lai as Mother

== Plot ==
As a child, Wen Guang is isolated as he has autism. His younger brother, grows up and takes care of him after their mother died when they were just kids. His brother's name is not revealed, as Wen Guang calls him 'Didi' (literally younger brother). 'Didi' works as a waiter at a snooker café.

The film starts with the iconic introduction lines of Wen Guang, which briefly explains his name, age and his nature: "Hello, I am Wen Guang. I am 27 years old. I am nice, kind. I might look a bit weird sometimes, it is because I have autism". Wen Guang go for an interview at a flower shop as told by his brother to get a job. Wen Guang usually avoids eye contact when he speaks. When he leaves after the interview goes unsuccessful, he hears the clear movement from the sound of a ringing doorbell. It triggers something inside of him.

Didi is annoyed that he did not get the job. Didi is stressed as he just broke up with his girlfriend due to fear of not able to give her a stable life, and he has to take care of Wen Guang. Wen Guang asks if he can get a piano although he do not know how to play, Didi replies he has to get a job first. One day, when Wen Guang is in a piano shop, a young lady named Sue Ann goes to the shop and plans to sell her piano. Wen Guang overhears the conversation and exclaims loudly at the lady, "Why are you selling your piano?" muttering that she is not appreciating and takes it for granted. They become friends later at the bus stop.

Wen Guang soon gets a job washing dishes near the snooker cafe. As the loud music blasts at the background, Wen Guang hears the clinking of wine glasses, and triggers the scenes of ringing, symbolising realisation, similar to the one at the flower shop. He tells Didi he doesn't want a piano any more as he starts collecting glasses. He collects glasses from markets and trash bins, and even took a wine glass from a beggar. He is fired from his job when he is caught stealing a glass cup. Didi scolds him and Wen Guang promises to never do it again.

He meets Sue Ann when eating at a stall. Sue Ann is a volunteer at the centre of children with special needs. He explains to her his endeavours to find more glasses in specified lengths and describing the notes and frequency that each cup would make. He explains that he is lacking two more glasses. His brother pursues him to go find another job. He goes for an interview in a cafe at mall, after nights of Didi forcing him to do eye contact. When the cafe owner finds out he is autistic, they tell him they will contact him in the future calmly. The owner explains that there is a large amount of social interactions working in a cafe and she does not want to stress him. Wen Guang is fed up, he slams the table and leaves.

He walks into a shop where glasses are being sold. His eyes caught onto a big bowl. He tests the sound and smiles. However the price is RM1700 (US$400). He puts it down, muttering to himself, "No..." and walks away. Didi is angry again and cannot understand why he cannot be hired. His friend assures him and gives Wen Guang a job as a cashier at his shop. One day as Wen Guang walks home, he hears the clinking of glasses from the nearby dumpster truck. Wen Guang sneakily hangs onto the ledge of the truck and he is led to the rubbish islands. He digs through all the rubbish with his bare hands to look for that glass. He finds it and goes home with joy.

When he reaches home, it is revealed that Wen Guang had stolen the RM1700 bowl. The police have come and asked for him to return it and give a statement at the station. When the police go outside to wait for him, Didi loses his temper. He grabs Wen Guang and slams him against the TV. Wen Guang froze with fear as Didi mooing at him angrily, wishing him to be normal, asking him why he stole and only spends his time doing useless things like collecting glasses, all while Wen Guang shakes and stutters. He runs into Wen Guang's room and throws the glasses outside. Wen Guang tries to grab the box but it is too late. The breaking of the glasses is heard. He stumbles and breaks down, collapsing and chatters. Didi says: "When mom died, you didn't cry, now you're crying over some stupid glasses?"

At night, after Wen Guang gave his statement at the station, he hides himself in his room. Afterwards, when Didi opens the door, Wen Guang is not inside. Didi panics and tries to find him with his friend at nearby. In the car, he yells with frustration that he cannot succeed in life because he had a brother like him. His friend reasoned with him that he should understand Wen Guang's situation. They try to find him but to no avail. He then waits hours at the bus stop to find Sue Ann. Sue Ann says he has not seen Wen Guang in a while, but tells him that Wen Guang wants to do something related to notes using the glasses.

After making police report, Didi flashbacks to when they were children. In school, Wen Guang jumped into the drain when it was raining. He is laughed by his classmates. He gets scolded and hit on hand once by his mother. Didi laughs at him, but gets hit even more by her. She tells Didi that he cannot make fun of Wen Guang as Wen Guang has autism. Upon thinking, Didi then cries, saying that he didn't try to understand Wen Guang at all from his point of view. They went back to their old house and pays respect to their mother at her grave. Didi flashbacks again to when their mother was passing away, she told Didi to remind Wen Guang to brush his teeth and remember to eat.

Wen Guang now lives on the streets, under a bridge where he place the collected glasses. He makes a handmade machine using glasses. He is seen stumbling and running away stealing glasses on the streets, and sleeps on the roadside with his blanket. A few weeks after Wen Guang disappears, one day Didi goes home and find Wen Guang, dirtied from head to toes, asking for the suction used to clean fish tanks. Didi agrees and Wen Guang takes the suction and goes back to his room. Didi lights a cigarette with relief.

Inside his room, Wen Guang is seen suctioning the water on the machine, as it pours onto a row of different sized glass bowls and cups, which spins as he steps on the pedal. With the water touching the glasses, different notes of sounds are made. From the sounds, a song is made. Didi hears the music from outside.

Flashbacking to when Wen Guang was young, he was asked to perform on stage. However he froze with fear and did not play. His mother, however, clapped along with the song. When he got home, he extends his hand to get hit by his mother. But his mother touches his palm, caressing it, making Wen Guang raise his head for the first time, looking into his mother's eyes as she smiled warmly at him. He has used the glasses he collected to play that song he was unable to play for his mother when she was alive. The music plays, as Didi sinks to the ground, sobbing outside of his room after hearing the song, finally understanding why he collected the glasses so painstakingly. Wen Guang has done all of this, using his hidden talent of perfect pitch, precise to the point of differentiating each frequency level.

Eventually, Wen Guang is now a piano tuner by using his pitch. He works for the piano store boss. On their way back together, Didi tells him he might want to date Sue Ann. The scene ends with the two brothers walking side by side, as Wen Guang laughs: "Short circuit!"

== Awards ==
The film was nominated for 9 awards in the 30th Malaysian Film Festival (FFM 30) in 2019. It eventually won 4 awards:

- Best New Director – Quek Shio Chuan
- Best New Actor – Kyo Chen
- Best Cinematography – Yeong Tuck Wei
- Best Art Direction – Chan Hsien Yu
