= Jinan dialect =

Mandarin dialect of Shandong, China

- 濟南話
- Native to: Urban Jinan in the People's Republic of China
- Region: Northeastern China
- Language family: Sino-Tibetan: Sinitic; Chinese; Mandarin; Jilu Mandarin; Jinan dialect

Language codes
- ISO 639-3: –
- Glottolog: jina1245

The Jinan dialect (simplified Chinese: 济南话; traditional Chinese: 濟南話; pinyin: Jǐnánhuà) is a Mandarin Chinese dialect spoken in Jinan in Shandong province, China. It is a variety of Jilu Mandarin.

== Sociolinguistics ==
Younger generations have increasingly levelled the Jinan dialect in the direction of Standard Chinese. The bulk of this article describes conservative features of the dialect and may reflect not reflect the speech of the youngest speakers.

== Phonetics and phonology ==
=== Consonants ===
Consonants of the Jinan dialect
		Labial	Alveolar	Alveolo-palatal	Retroflex	Velar
Nasal		m 沒貓悶牤	n 奶餒孬囔	ɲ 妮鳥牛拗		ŋ 醃我癌俺
Plosive	plain	p 靶波甭殯	t 丟盹襠洞			k 尜蛤玍硌
Plosive	aspirated	pʰ 趴苤瓢耪	tʰ 他熥頹頭			kʰ 楷傀肯昆
Affricate	plain		ts 做咂宰堆	tɕ 雞集姐街	tʂ 知妯阻擇	
Affricate	aspirated		tsʰ 刺粗測糙	tɕʰ 掐卡鉛前	tʂʰ 戳踩搋抻	
Fricative	voiceless	f 付肺帆奉	s 死蓑賽孫	ɕ 蝦協謝笑	ʂ 廈所澀順	x 攉孩齁昏
Fricative	voiced	v 挖我外萬			ʐ 日惹繞肉	
Approximant			l 捋弱雷榮			

==== Comparisons with Beijing dialect ====
Many innovations and retentions from Middle Chinese present in the Beijing dialect are also found in Jinan, which accounts for the similarity in phoneme inventory. There are, of course, some differences. Examples follow.

The distribution of the voiceless retroflex initials in Jinan is largely to similar to that in Beijing. Where Beijing has /tʂ/, /tʂʰ/, /ʂ/, Jinan is also inclined to have them. However, the converse fails in a handful of cases, where Jinan has /tʂ/, /tʂʰ/, /ʂ/, but Beijing has the corresponding alveolar consonant.

Distribution of tʂ, tʂʰ, ʂ
	莊	搋	生	森	策
Jinan	tʂuaŋ	tʂʰuɛ	ʂəŋ	ʂẽ	tʂʰei
Beijing	tʂuaŋ	tʂʰuai	ʂəŋ	sən	tsʰɤ

In these cases, Jinan dialect is the one that shows the expected reflex of the Middle Chinese initial.

Jinan dialect consistently reflects the northern Mandarin innovation where *∅>ŋ when not followed by /u/, while Beijing dialect does not.

*∅>ŋ
	俺	襖	我	屋
Jinan	ŋã	ŋɔ	ŋə	u
Beijing	an	au	wo	u

Jinan dialect usually reflects the Middle Chinese 日 initial as /ʐ/, except before u, where it is merged into /l/. This contrasts with Beijing Mandarin, which has /ʐ/ in all cases, as well as with other Jilu varieties, which demonstrate a variety of patterns. The non-Beijing dialects below are all usually categorized as Jilu.

Reflexes of the 日 initial
	人	肉	扔	軟	亂
Jinan	ʐẽ	ʐou	ləŋ	luã	luã
Zibo	lə̃	ləu	ləŋ	luã	luã
Tianjin	in	iou		yan	luan
Cangzhou	ʐən	ʐou		yan	lan
Beijing	ʐən	ʐou	ʐəŋ	ʐuan	luan

=== Finals ===
Finals of the Jinan dialect
Medial	Rime														
Medial	∅	ɿ	ʅ	ə˞	a	ə	ɛ	ei	ɔ	ou	ã	ẽ	aŋ	əŋ	ŋ̩
∅		ɿ 滋刺四	ʅ 知史日	ə˞ 兒耳二	a 八蛇醃	ə 波各可	ɛ 伯別海	ei 杯德黑	ɔ 包貓繞	ou 兜周肉	ã 班寒漢	ẽ 悶人艮	aŋ 幫倉讓	əŋ 風熥恆	(ŋ̩) 嗯
i	i 鼻笛匿				ia 倆家鴨	iə 別姐爺	iɛ 街解挨		iɔ 標了嚼	iou 丟六拗	iã 邊蔫眼	iẽ 拼心音	iaŋ 良江羊		iŋ 冰精硬
u	u 不木五				ua 抓瓜滑	uə 多掠活	uɛ 拽乖壞	uei 堆雷水			uã 端拴官	uẽ 村春昏	uaŋ 莊光晃		uŋ 東榮紅
y	y 足局魚					yə 腳靴月					yã 捐選元	yẽ 君巡允			yŋ 松粽用

Erhua affects most rimes as follows; medials stay the same.

Erhua in Jinan dialect
Rime	Rime + 兒
ɿ	eɻ
ʅ	eɻ
i	ieɻ
u	uɻ
y	yəɻ
a	aɻ
ə	əɻ
ɛ	ɛɻ
ei	eɻ
ɔ	ɔɻ
ou	ouɻ
ã	ɛɻ
ẽ	eɻ
aŋ	ãɻ
əŋ	ə̃ɻ
iŋ	iə̃ɻ
uŋ	uə̃ɻ

For speakers in the suburbs, nasalization in the erhuaized syllable may be dropped, merging e.g. /iə̃ɻ/ ← /iŋ/ + 兒 and /iəɻ/ ← /iə/ + 兒.

=== Tones ===
Tone chart of the Jinan dialect
Tone number	Tone name	Tone contour
1	yin ping (陰平)	˨˩˧ (213)
2	yang ping (陽平)	˦˨ (42)
3	shang sheng (上聲)	˥ (55)
4	qu sheng (去聲)	˨˩ (21)

Jinan dialect also makes use of the neutral tone in the second syllable of a disyllabic unit. The neutral tone's pitch is dependent on the tone of the preceding syllable (see below).

As in many other Chinese varieties, there is tone sandhi. In Jinan dialect, tone sandhi largely affects the first syllable of a disyllabic unit. Some rules are general phonological processes; others are lexically determined.

Tone Sandhi
First tone ↓ Second tone →	1 ˨˩˧	2 ˦˨	3 ˥	4 ˨˩	Neutral ∅
1 ˨˩˧	˨˩˧ ˨˩˧ → ˨˧(23) ˨˩˧	-	-	˨˩ ˨˩ → ˨˧(23) ˨˩	˨˩˧ ∅ → ˨˩ ˩ or ˨˩˧ ∅ → ˨˩˧ ˥ (Note: rare)
2 ˦˧	-	-	-	˦˨ ˨˩ → ˥(55) ˨˩ or no change	˦˨ ∅ → ˥ ˥ or ˦˨ ∅ → ˦˨ ˨
3 ˥	-	-	˥ ˥ → ˦˨(42) ˨˩	No change or ˥ ˨˩ → ˨˩˧ ˨˩	˥ ∅ → ˨˩˧ ˦ or ˥ ∅ → ˥ ˨
4 ˨˩	-	-	-	˨˩ ˨˩ → ˨˧(23) ˨˩ or no change	˨˩ ∅ → ˦ ˨ or ˨˩ ∅ → ˨˩ ˩

== Grammar ==
=== Pronouns ===
==== Personal pronouns ====
The following list is not exhaustive.

Personal pronouns
	Singular	Plural
1st Person	我、俺、咱	我們、俺、俺們、咱、咱們
2nd Person	你	你們
3rd Person	他	他們

The pronoun 俺 ŋã derives from a contraction of 我們, but can nowadays also be used in the singular. In fact, the singular use has become more common than the plural one, and the latter use is often reinforced by an additional instance of the plural suffix 們.

Besides 們, Jinan dialect also has the dual suffix 倆 and the plural suffix 這伙, which can be attached to any of the singular pronouns.

==== Interrogatives ====
Interrogatives
who	ʂei˥˧
what	mə˥˧
how	tsəŋ˧˨˦mə
where	na˧˨˦ɲi
which	na˧˨˦kə
when	tuə˥tsã

/mə˥˧/ is distinct from its equivalent word in Beijing dialect, which is a disyllabic form. A monosyllabic word for 'what' is also found in other Ji-Lu varieties such as Tianjin dialect.

=== Comparatives ===
Jinan has a separate strategy using the morpheme 起 for forming comparatives in addition to that which is found in Standard Chinese.

他 高 起 我
3S tall COMP 1S
'He is taller than me'

The morpheme 起 is preceded by the quality to be compared and followed by the basis of comparison. The word order is not affected in negative comparisons or in polar questions.

=== Tense and aspect ===
==== Perfective aspect ====
In Jinan dialect, the perfective aspect is formed by the postverbal particle lɔ. It indicates that an action is terminated. This is distinct from the perfect lia. Younger speakers may not distinguish the two, rendering both as lə, as in Standard Chinese.

我 睡 了 一剎兒
və ʂuei lɔ itʂʰaɻ
I sleep PFV a.moment
I fell asleep for a moment.

==== The particle kʰə ====
The particle kʰə, sometimes written as 可, can be used in manifold ways.

Firstly, it can indicate that two events occur in some form of temporal conjunction. The events are usually encoded as clauses, although the first one may also be a temporal adverbial. Whether the two clauses are simultaneous or in sequence is clausally dependent. In this usage, kʰə occurs at the end of the first clause.

等 我 縫 完 了 被子 可， 我 和 你 一塊兒 把 褥子 曬 出去
wait 1S sew CMPL PFV blanket kʰə, 1S and 2S together DISP mattress sun.dry go.out
'Wait for me to finish sewing and then we'll take the mattress outside to sundry.'

In the above sentence, the two clauses are interpreted to take place in sequence, as that is sensible based off the meaning of the individual clauses.

三號 可 你 就 能 來 了
third kʰə 2S just can come PFV
'Once it's the third, you can come.'

The act of coming occurs at the same time as the day of the month specified; the two can not be consecutive. This shows that the interpretation of kʰə is sensitive to clausal meaning — not broader context.

Secondly, kʰə can be used after a condition in an implication. This can be used in different kinds of implications, including hypotheticals and counterfactuals. this is derived from the previous use.

天上 下 金子 可， 也 輪 不 到 你 去 揀 去
sky precipitate gold kʰə, also get.a.chance NEG CMPL 2S go pick.up go
'Even if it's raining gold, it wouldn't mean that you will get to go pick it up.'

Thirdly, kʰə can be used to mark a prohibitive. The course of development is: 'giving a condition in an implication' → 'giving a reason for an imperative or prohibitive' → 'marking the prohibitive'.

別 叫 他 知道 了 可
PROH let 3s know PFV kʰə
'Don't let him know!'

The above example uses kʰə alongside the usual prohibitive 別; either one may be dropped and the meaning of the sentence would be preserved.

== See also ==
- Jilu Mandarin
- Varieties of Chinese
