= Hikari, Yamaguchi =

Hikari 光市
- City
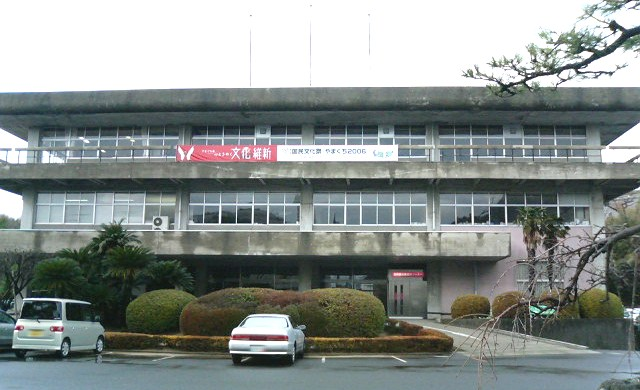
- Hikari city office

- Flag Emblem
- Interactive map of Hikari
- Location in Japan
- Coordinates: 33°57′43″N 131°56′32″E
- Country: Japan
- Region: Chūgoku (San'yō)
- Prefecture: Yamaguchi

Government
  - Mayor: Osamu Yoshioka

Area
  - Total: 92.13 km^{2} (35.57 sq mi)

Population (May 31, 2023)
  - Total: 49,100
  - Density: 533/km^{2} (1,380/sq mi)
- Time zone: UTC+09:00 (JST)
- City hall address: 6-1-1 Chūō, Hikari-shi, Yamaguchi-ken 743-8501
- Website: Official website
- Symbols
- Flower: Ume
- Tree: Japanese Black Pine

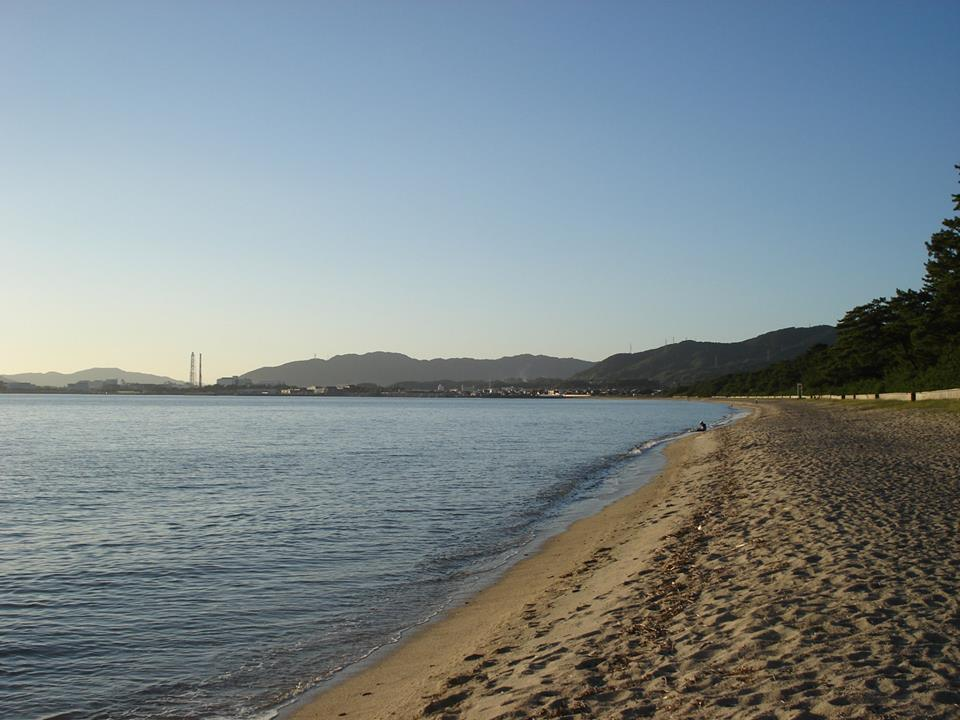
Murozumi Coast

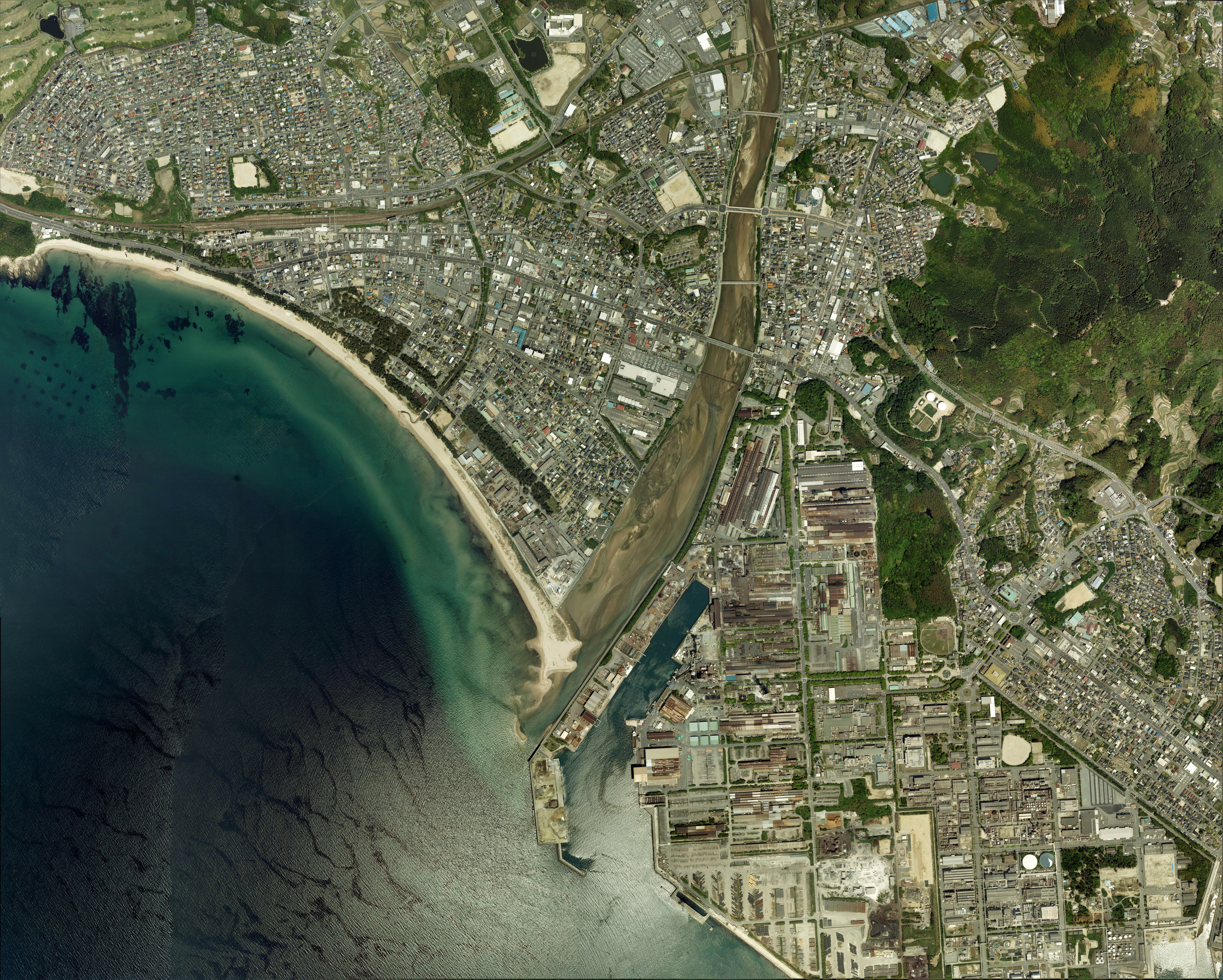
Hikari city center area Aerial photograph

Hikari (光市, Hikari-shi) is a city located in Yamaguchi Prefecture, Japan. As of 31 May 2023, the city had an estimated population of 49,100 in 23577 households and a population density of 530 persons per km^{2}. The total area of the city is 92.13 square kilometres (35.57 sq mi). The name Hikari itself means "brilliance" or "light" in Japanese.

== Geography ==
The urban center of Hikari is located on the alluvial plain of the Shimada River, and on both ends of it lies the Murozumi Coast and Nijigahama Beach, forming part of the Setonaikai National Park. The hilly area from the northern part of the city to the eastern part is the Sekishiroyama Prefectural Natural Park.

=== Neighbouring municipalities ===
Yamaguchi Prefecture

- Iwakuni
- Kudamatsu
- Shūnan
- Yanai

=== Climate ===
Hikari has a humid subtropical climate (Köppen climate classification Cfa) with very warm summers and cool winters. The average annual temperature in Hikari is 15.6 °C. The average annual rainfall is 1678 mm with September as the wettest month. The temperatures are highest on average in July, at around 26.2 °C, and lowest in January, at around 5.6 °C.

== Demographics ==
Per Japanese census data, the population of Hikari has been relatively steady for the past 70 years.

Historical population
Year	Pop.	±%
1940	30,443	—
1950	45,781	+50.4%
1960	44,794	−2.2%
1970	52,898	+18.1%
1980	57,905	+9.5%
1990	56,410	−2.6%
2000	54,680	−3.1%
2010	52,995	−3.1%
Hikari population statistics

== History ==
The area of Hikai was part of an ancient Suō Province and traces of settlements dating to the Yayoi period have been found. Murozumi Bay used to be called Mitarai Bay, and was a key point for maritime traffic on the Seto Inland Sea in ancient times. The name comes from the legend that Empress Jingū washed her hands in this bay when she was on her way to conquer the Korean Peninsula. In addition, the Silla expeditionary force led by Otomo Satehiko found shelter here when it was caught in a storm. During the Edo Period, the area was part of the holdings of Chōshū Domain and prospered as a port-of-call for the kitamaebune coastal trade. Following the Meiji restoration, the villages of Mitsui, Shimada, Mii and Asae within Kumage District, Yamaguchi was established with the creation of the modern municipalities system on April 1, 1889. These municipalities were merged for the town of Shunan on April 1, 1939. The town was renamed Hikari on October 1, 1940, On April 1, 1943 Hikari merged with the town of Murozumi to form the city of Hikari.

=== Military ===
The Hikari Naval Arsenal (or Dockyard) included a fire-control factory, built in 1942, that employed about 600 people. It was one of the principal establishments for producing the Standard H.A. System (Type 94 Kosha Sochi) at the rate of ~15 per month, along with bomb components, torpedo afterbodies, and misc. machined parts.

The Imperial Japanese Navy formed the Second Special Attack Force (former First Special Base Unit) on March 1, 1945, at Hikari for conducting kaiten attacks. Rear Admiral Nagai Mitsuru was the commanding officer. On that same day, a kaiten crew training unit is also formed at Hirao, SE of Hikari. This was one of four such kaiten training bases.

With hints of cessation of hostilities, bombing raids by U.S. forces were canceled. However, resumption of bombing was ordered on August 13, 1945. The Hikari Naval Arsenal was consequently bombed the next day on August 14, 1945 (one day before the end of war), taking 738 lives. The attacking U.S. aircraft were 156 B-29 bombers of the 40th Bomb Group stationed in Saipan, supported by P-51 Mustangs from Iwo Jima. The 40th Bomb Group dropped 3,540 bombs (885 tons) on the Hikari Naval Arsenal, resulting in severe destruction. Including this bombing, Hikari lost more than 1,200 citizens in World War II, both military and civilian. After surrender, Allied forces found 52 kaiten at Hikari and destroyed them.

=== Postwar ===
On July 1, 1955 Hikari annexed the village of Suō. On October 4, 2004, the town of Yamato (from Kumage District) was merged into Hikari.

The former Hikari Naval Arsenal is now the sites for Nippon Steel Corporation and vaccine manufacturing by Takeda Pharmaceutical Company. Takeda discovered the hull of a Type 4 Kaiten under one of the buildings in August 1989, an attestation to the history of the site.

The Kaiten Monument, erected in 1996, honors Hikari Naval Arsenal kaiten pilots. Steel frames that once constituted the structure of the destroyed Hikari Naval Arsenal were used to build the Tsukumo Bridge.

== Government ==
Hikari has a mayor-council form of government with a directly elected mayor and a unicameral city council of 18 members. Hikari contributes two members to the Yamaguchi Prefectural Assembly. In terms of national politics, the city is part of the Yamaguchi 2nd district of the lower house of the Diet of Japan.

== Economy ==
Hikari has a mixed economy based on heavy industry and pharmaceuticals, as well as agriculture and commercial fishing. There are several industrial parks in the city.

== Education ==
Hikari has 11 public elementary school and five public junior high schools operated by the city government, and one public high school operated by the Yamaguchi Prefectural Board of Education. There are also one elementary school and one junior high school operated by Yamaguchi University Faculty of Education, and one private high school.

== Transportation ==
=== Railway ===
JR West (JR West) - San'yō Main Line

- Iwata - Shimata - Hikari

=== Highways ===
- National Route 188

== Notable people from Hikari ==
- Ito Hirobumi, first Prime Minister of Japan
- Shoichi Ichikawa, politician
- Maya Koikeda, manga artist
- Yōsuke Matsuoka, diplomat and Foreign Minister of Japan
- Kenji Miyamoto, Communist politician
- Daisuke Nanba, attempted assassin of Crown Prince Hirohito
- Kairi Sane, Japanese female professional wrestler (WWE)
