= Hikari Station =

Railway station in Hikari, Yamaguchi Prefecture, Japan

Hikari Station 光駅
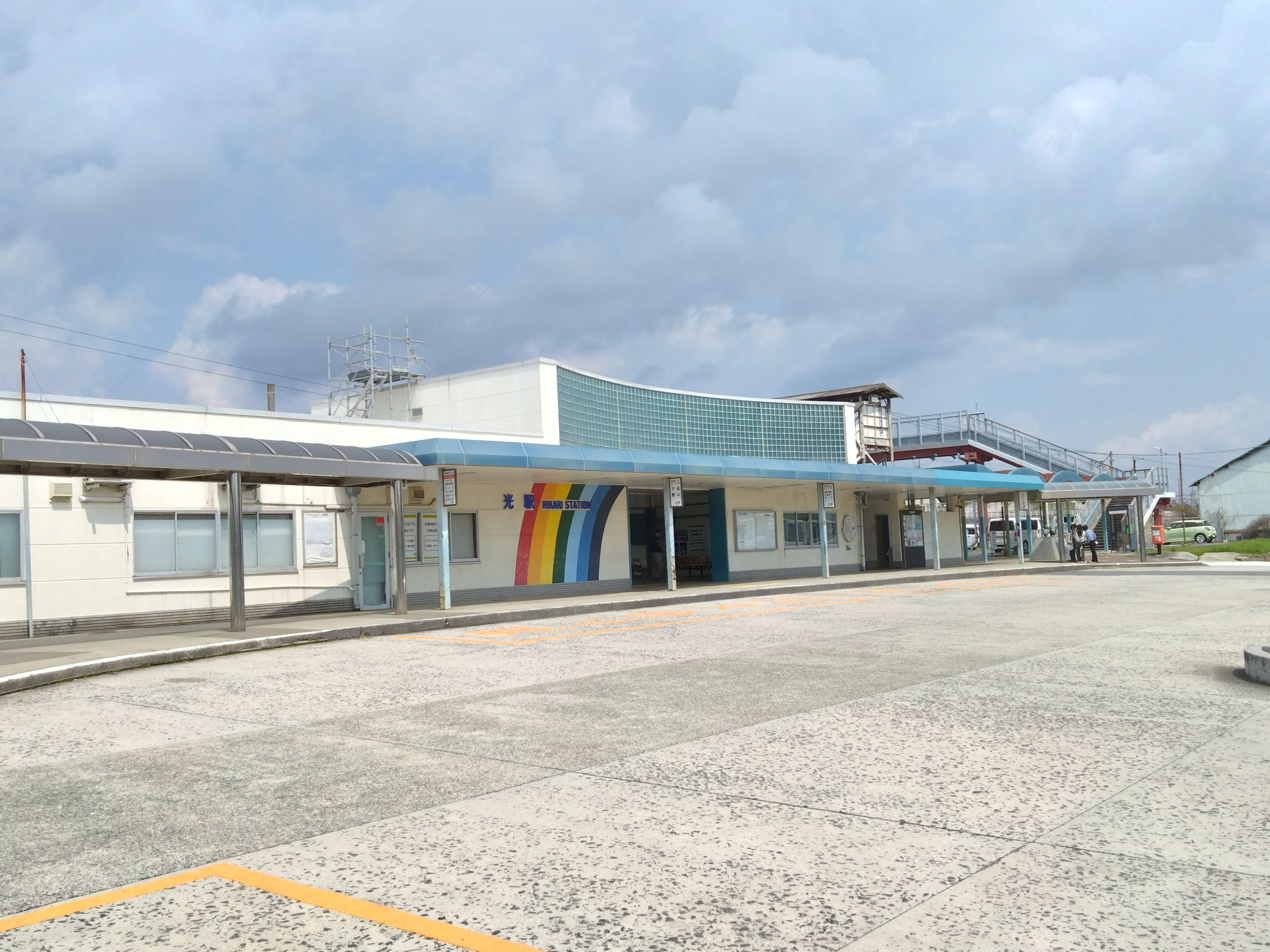
- Hikari Station in April 2026

General information
- Location: 3-chōme-1 Nijigahama, Hikari-shi, Yamaguchi-ken 743-0022; Japan
- Coordinates: 33°58′25.27″N 131°54′53.9″E
- Owner: West Japan Railway Company
- Operator: West Japan Railway Company
- Line: San'yō Line
- Distance: 400.7 km (249.0 miles) from Kobe
- Platforms: 1 side + 1 island platform
- Tracks: 5
- Connections: Bus stop

Construction
- Accessible: Yes

Other information
- Status: Staffed
- Website: Official website

History
- Opened: 11 April 1912; 114 years ago
- Former names: Nijigahama (until 1941)

Passengers
- FY2022: 1971

Services
Preceding station	JR West	Following station
Kudamatsu towards Shimonoseki	San'yō Line Local	Shimata towards Iwakuni
Location
- Location within Yamaguchi Prefecture Location within Japan

Hikari Station (光駅, Hikari-eki) is a passenger railway station located in the city of Yanai, Yamaguchi Prefecture, Japan. It is operated by the West Japan Railway Company (JR West). The station is located in the Nijigahama area of Hikari, on the northwest side of the city. Nijigahama Beach (虹ヶ浜, Nijigahama) is located nearby.

== Lines ==
Hikari Station is served by the JR West Sanyō Main Line, and is located 400.7 kilometers from the terminus of the line at Kobe.

== Station layout ==
The station has five tracks, with three tracks devoted to passenger use. The tracks are numbered 2–6, since track 1 was removed for elevator construction for accessibility. The station building connects directly to a side platform where track 2 is found. Track 3 also has been removed. Tracks 5 and 6 are served by the island platform. The station building is located on the south side of the station, and the footbridge connecting the two platforms is on the east side of the station. The station is staffed.

== Platforms ==
2	■ San'yō Line	for Tokuyama and Hōfu
5, 6	■ San'yō Line	for Yanai and Iwakuni

== History ==
Hikari Station was opened as Nijigahama Station (虹ヶ浜駅) on 11 April 1912. It was renamed "Hikari Station" on 1 February 1941. The present station building was completed in July 1983. With the privatization of the Japan National Railway (JNR) on 1 April 1987, the station came under the aegis of the West Japan railway Company (JR West).

== Passenger statistics ==
In fiscal 2022, the station was used by an average of 1971 passengers daily.

== Surrounding area ==
- Nijigahama Beach
- Hikari City Hikari General Hospital
- Yamaguchi Prefectural Hikarioka High School
- Hikari Municipal Asae Junior High School
- Hikari City Asae Elementary School

== See also ==
- List of railway stations in Japan
