= Tianjin dialect =

Mandarin dialect spoken in the city of Tianjin

Tianjin
- 天津话; Tiānjīnhuà
- Native to: People's Republic of China
- Region: Tianjin; Sabah, Malaysia
- Language family: Sino-Tibetan: Sinitic; Chinese; Mandarin; Jilu Mandarin; Tianjin

Language codes
- ISO 639-3: –
- ISO 639-6: tjin
- Glottolog: tian1238
- IETF: cmn-u-sd-cntj

The Tianjin dialect (simplified Chinese: 天津话; traditional Chinese: 天津話; pinyin: Tiānjīnhuà) is a Mandarin dialect spoken in the city of Tianjin, China. It is largely comprehensible to speakers of other varieties Mandarin, especially those who also know Standard Mandarin, though its greatest deviation from the others lies in the specific values of the tones, the way tones affect each other, and the lack of retroflex consonants. These regional characteristics make the variety an important part of the identity of the people of Tianjin, and sharply contrasts with the variety spoken in nearby Beijing, despite relatively similar phonology.

== Classification ==
Tianjin dialect dialectologist Li Shih-yu (Chinese: 李世瑜) compared the characteristics of the Tianjin dialect with those of surrounding varieties and believed that it was unique to its area, part of a language enclave. In 1991, he proposed a theory called the "Tianjin Dialect Island". It posited that the Tianjin dialect was not directly related to any of its surrounding varieties and instead was an independent variety. Using the level tone as a standard for analysing the Tianjin dialect, Li found that the boundary between where the Tianjin dialect is spoken and where its surrounding varieties are spoken does not coincide with the current administrative, geopolitical boundaries of the city of Tianjin. The varieties spoken in the northeast of the enclave, such as the Ninghe dialect, belong to the Jilu Mandarin language group, the varieties spoken in the northwest, such as the Wuqing dialect, belong to the Beijing Mandarin language group, whilst the varieties spoken in the southwest and southeast belong to the Jinghai language group, which itself also belongs to the Jilu Mandarin language group. The Tianjin language enclave is surrounded by Jilu Mandarin varieties and Beijing Mandarin varieties.

== Characteristics ==
The Tianjin dialect is classified under Jilu Mandarin, a subdivision of Mandarin Chinese dialects also spoken in Hebei and Shandong provinces. Despite Tianjin being a neighbor of Beijing, its dialect sounds very different from the Beijing dialect, which is the basis for Standard Chinese.

The tones of the Tianjin dialect correspond to those of the Beijing dialect, and hence Standard Mandarin, as follows:

Tone name	1 陰平; Level	2 陽平; Rise	3 上; Fall-Rise	4 去; Fall
Tianjin	˨˩ (21)	˧˥ (35)	˩˩˧ (113)	˥˧ (53)
Beijing	˥ (55)	˧˥ (35)	˨˩˦ (214)	˥˩ (51)

The differences are minor except for the first tone: Where it is high and level in Beijing, it is low and falling in Tianjin. All words with the first tone, including the name "Tianjin", are affected, giving the Tianjin dialect a downward feel to people from Beijing.

The Tianjin dialect also includes four tone sandhi rules, more than the Beijing dialect. They are,

1. Tone 1 + Tone 1 → Tone 3-Tone 1: 天津 tiān jīn is pronounced /tǐanjīn/ (using Pinyin tone diacritics)
2. Tone 3 + Tone 3 → Tone 2-Tone 3: 水果 shuǐ guǒ is pronounced /shuíguǒ/ (as in Standard)
3. Tone 4 + Tone 4 → Tone 1-Tone 4: 現在 xiàn zài is pronounced /xiānzài/
4. Tone 4 + Tone 1 → Tone 2-Tone 1: 上班 shàng bān is pronounced /shángbān/

There are some other patterns that differentiate the Tianjin dialect from the Beijing dialect. One is the pronunciation of 饿 (餓) as wò (臥) instead of è.

Lastly, the Tianjin dialect lacks the retroflex consonants (捲舌音) prevalent in Beijing, not unlike Taiwanese Mandarin. Thus, zh (ㄓ) becomes z (ㄗ), sh (ㄕ) becomes s (ㄙ), ch (ㄔ) becomes c (ㄘ), and r (ㄖ) becomes y (一); that is, 人 is pronounced yěn instead of rén, and 讓 is pronounced yàng (樣) instead of ràng. However, the use of the -er (儿) diminutive is common in the Tianjin dialect, as it is throughout the north and northeast. (See: Erhua.)

== Culture ==
Speakers of other Mandarin varieties commonly stereotype the Tianjin dialect as comedic- or confrontational-sounding. This combined with its practical absence from television broadcasts due to the promotion of Standard Mandarin has led to the dialect sometimes being perceived as less formal and serious.

Tianjin has produced numerous crosstalk artists. The traditional crosstalk repertoire encompasses over 300 pieces, many of which are performed in the local variety. Traditionally, a crosstalk piece or artist must become popular in Tianjin to achieve status even within oversea Chinese communities, although performances are primarily performed in the Beijing dialect.

== See also ==
- List of Chinese dialects
