= Jiaoliao Mandarin =

Dialect of Mandarin Chinese

Jiao–Liao Mandarin
- Peninsular Mandarin
- Native to: China
- Region: Shandong and Liaodong
- Native speakers: 35 million (2019)
- Language family: Sino-Tibetan: Sinitic; Chinese; Mandarin; Jiao–Liao Mandarin

Language codes
- ISO 639-3: –
- ISO 639-6: jliu
- Glottolog: None huab1238 Central Plain Guanhua
- Linguasphere: 79-AAA-bd
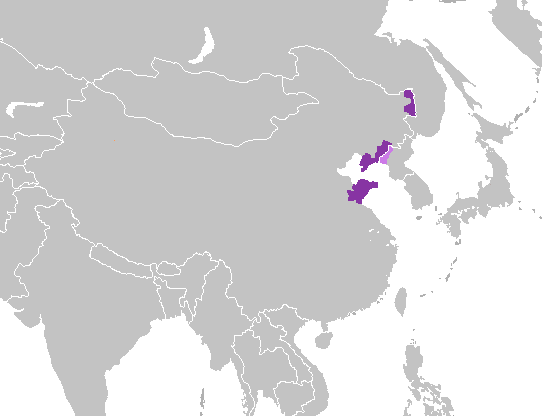

Jiaoliao or Jiao–Liao Mandarin (simplified Chinese: 胶辽官话; traditional Chinese: 膠遼官話; pinyin: Jiāo–Liáo Guānhuà), sometimes referred to as Peninsular Mandarin, is a primary dialect of Mandarin Chinese, spoken on the Jiaodong Peninsula, from Yantai to Qingdao, Ganyu District in northeastern Jiangsu, and in the Liaodong Peninsula, from Dalian to Dandong, and in Mishan, Hulin, Fuyuan & Raohe counties of Heilongjiang.

== Etymology ==
Jiao is short for the Jiao River. Liao is short for the Liaodong Peninsula, and the name Liaodong means "East of the Liao River". (Liao is also an abbreviation used for the city of Liaoyang.)

== Characteristics ==
Usually, the defining criterion of Mandarin subgroups is taken to be the behaviour of Middle Chinese checked syllables. In Jiaoliao Mandarin, Middle Chinese checked syllables with voiceless initials are usually assigned the shǎng 上 tone. Below, all but Jinan, which act as a basis of comparison, are classified as Jiaoliao Mandarin.

Tones assigned to MC checked syllables with voiceless initials
	一	割	國	北
Yantai	i shǎng	ka shǎng	kuo shǎng	po shǎng
Dalian	i yángpíng	ka shǎng	kuɤ shǎng	pɤ yángpíng
Qingdao	i shǎng	kɑ shǎng	kue shǎng	pe shǎng
Laizhou	i shǎng	ka shǎng	kuei shǎng	pei shǎng
Dandong	i shǎng	kɤ shǎng	kuɤ shǎng	pei shǎng
Jinan	i yīnpíng	ka yīnpíng	kuɤ shǎng	pei yīnpíng

This pattern is thought to have once been more widespread in Northern China based on records of Early Mandarin in textual sources such as the Zhongyuan Yinyun and the sporadic appearance of the pattern in dialect islands in Hebei province, for instance in Jinzhou.

In Jiaoliao Mandarin, the Middle Chinese 日 initial is usually dropped.

日 initial reflexes
	人	肉
Yantai	i	iu
Dalian	in	iou
Qingdao	iẽ	iou
Laizhou	iẽ	iəu
Dandong	in	iou
Jinan	ʐẽ	ʐou

The Middle Chinese 知莊章 initials may be split into two initials, one retroflex and the other alveolo-palatal.

Jiaoliao Mandarin also retained the distinction between velars and alveolar sibilants in palatal environments.

== Sub-dialects ==
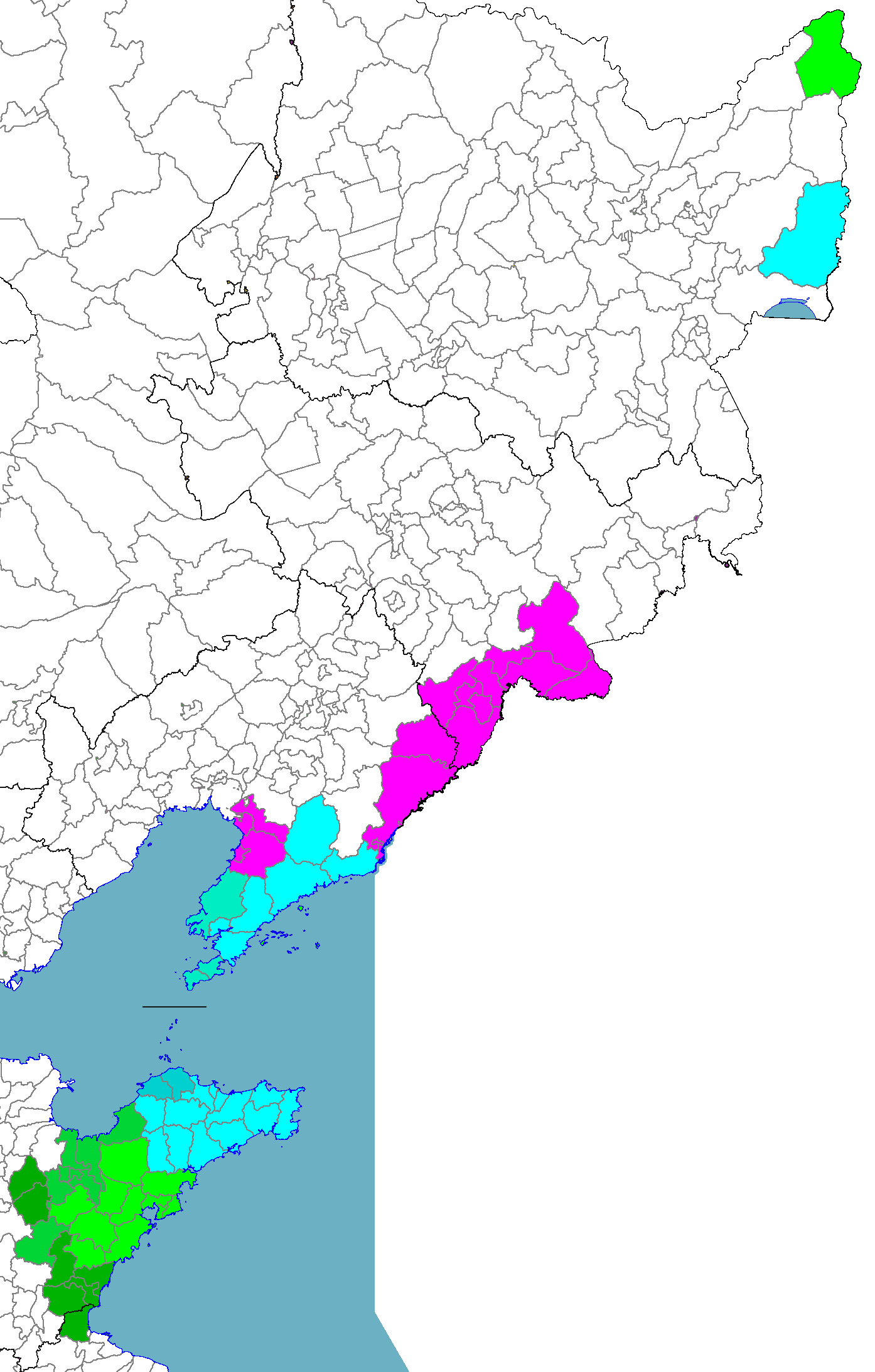
Distribution of Jiaoliao Mandarin

According to the 2012 edition of the Language Atlas of China, Jiao-Liao Mandarin can be divided into the following subgroups.

- Dēng-Lián 登連
  - Yān-Wēi 煙威
    - Yantai dialect
    - Weihai dialect
  - Péng-Lóng 蓬龍
  - Dà-Xiù 大岫
    - Dalian dialect
- Qīng-Lái 青萊
  - Jiāo-Lián 膠蓮
    - Qingdao dialect
  - Lái-Chāng
    - Weifang dialect
    - Laizhou dialect
- Gài-Huán 蓋桓
  - Dandong dialect
