= List of varieties of Chinese =

Distribution of Chinese dialect groups within the Greater China Region

This video explains the differences in pronunciation and vocabulary among Mandarin Dialects (Std. Mandarin, Sichuan Mandarin and NE Mandarin) and Cantonese.

The following is a list of Sinitic languages and their dialects. For a traditional dialectological overview, see also varieties of Chinese.

== Classification ==
Proportions of first-language speakers
1. Mandarin (65.7%)
2. Min (6.20%)
3. Wu (6.10%)
4. Yue (5.60%)
5. Jin (5.20%)
6. Gan (3.90%)
7. Hakka (3.50%)
8. Xiang (3.00%)
9. Huizhou (0.30%)
10. Pinghua, others (0.60%)

"Chinese" is a blanket term covering many different varieties spoken across China. Mandarin Chinese is the most popular dialect, and is used as a lingua franca across China.

Linguists classify these varieties as the Sinitic branch of the Sino-Tibetan language family. Within this broad classification, there are between seven and fourteen dialect groups, depending on the classification.

The conventionally accepted set of seven dialect groups first appeared in the second edition of the dialectology handbook edited by Yuan Jiahua (1961). In order of decreasing number of speakers, they are:

1. Mandarin (including Beijing and Nanjing variants)
2. Wu (including the Shanghainese and Suzhounese variants)
3. Yue (including the Cantonese and Taishanese variants)
4. Min (including the Hokkien and Fuzhounese variants)
5. Hakka (Kejia)
6. Xiang (Hunanese)
7. Gan (Jiangxinese)

The revised classification of Li Rong, used in the Language Atlas of China (1987) added three further groups split from these:

1. Mandarin → Jin
2. Wu → Huizhou
3. Yue → Pinghua
4. Min
5. Hakka (Kejia)
6. Xiang
7. Gan

== Summary ==
The number of speakers derived from statistics or estimates (2019) and were rounded:

Number	Branch	Native Speakers	Dialects
1	Mandarin	850,000,000	51
2	Wu	95,000,000	37
3	Yue	80,000,000	52
4	Jin	70,000,000	6
5	Min	60,000,000	61
6	Hakka	55,000,000	10
7	Xiang	50,000,000	25
8	Gan	30,000,000	9
9	Huizhou	7,000,000	13
10	Pinghua	3,000,000	2
Total	Chinese	1,300,000,000	266

== List of languages and dialects ==
In addition to the varieties listed below, it is customary to speak informally of dialects of each province (such as Sichuan dialect and Hainan dialect). These designations do not generally correspond to classifications used by linguists, but each nevertheless has characteristics of its own.

=== Gan ===
- 赣语/贛語

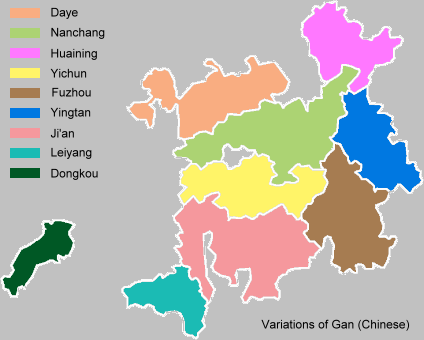
The main dialect areas of Gan in mainland China.

Dongkou Gan	洞口话	洞口話
Huaining Gan	怀宁话	懷寧話
Fuzhou Gan	抚州话	撫州話
Ji'an Gan	吉安话	吉安話
Leiyang Gan	耒阳话	耒陽話
Nanchang Gan	南昌话	南昌話
Xianning Gan	咸宁话	鹹寧話
Yichun Gan	宜春话	宜春話
Yingtan Gan	鹰潭话	鷹潭話

=== Mandarin ===
- 官话/官話

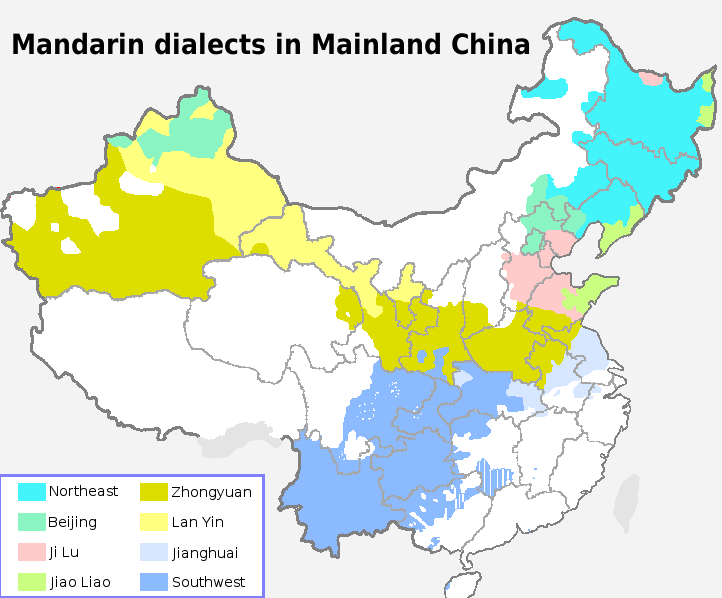
The main dialect areas of Mandarin in mainland China.

The number of speakers derived from statistics or estimates (2019) and were rounded:

Number	Branch	Native Speakers	Dialects
1	Beijing	35,000,000	7
2	Ji–Lu	110,000,000	4
3	Jianghuai	80,000,000	6
4	Jiao–Liao	35,000,000	4
5	Lan–Yin	10,000,000	3
6	Northeastern	100,000,000	4
7	Southwestern	280,000,000	11
8	Zhongyuan	200,000,000	11
Total	Mandarin	850,000,000	50

Beijing Mandarin	北京官话	北京官話
• Beijing dialect	北京话	北京話
• Standard Chinese	普通话 Putonghua (PRC) 国语 Guoyu (ROC) 标准华语 Biaozhun Huayu (Singapore) (Note: The official sanction of Mandarin as an official language has given rise to the following varieties of Standard Mandarin in areas that did not originally speak any dialect of the Mandarin group: Cantonese Mandarin; Singaporean Mandarin; Taiwanese Mandarin)	普通話 Putonghua (PRC) 國語 Guoyu (ROC) 標準華語 Biaozhun Huayu (Singapore)
• Philippine Mandarin	菲律宾华语	菲律賓華語
• Malaysian Mandarin	马来西亚华语	馬來西亞華語
• Chengde dialect	承德话	承德話
• Chifeng dialect	赤峰话	赤峰話
• Hailar dialect	海拉尔话	海拉爾話
Ji–Lu Mandarin	冀鲁官话	冀魯官話
• Baoding dialect	保定话	保定話
• Jinan dialect	济南话	濟南話
• Shijiazhuang dialect	石家庄话	石家莊話
• Tianjin dialect	天津话	天津話
Jianghuai Mandarin	江淮官话	江淮官話
• Hefei dialect	合肥话	合肥話
• Hainan Junjiahua	军家话	軍家話
• Nanjing dialect	南京话	南京話
• Nantong dialect	南通话	南通話
• Xiaogan dialect	孝感话	孝感話
• Yangzhou dialect	扬州话	揚州話
Jiao–Liao Mandarin	胶辽官话	膠遼官話
• Dalian dialect	大连话	大連話
• Qingdao dialect	青岛话	青島話
• Weihai dialect	威海话	威海話
• Yantai dialect	烟台话	煙台話
Lan–Yin Mandarin	兰银官话	蘭銀官話
• Lanzhou dialect	兰州话	蘭州話
• Xining dialect	西宁话	西寧話
• Yinchuan dialect	银川话	銀川話
Northeastern Mandarin	东北官话	東北官話
• Changchun dialect	长春话	長春話
• Harbin dialect	哈尔滨话	哈爾濱話
• Qiqihar dialect	齐齐哈尔话	齊齊哈爾話
• Shenyang dialect	沈阳话	瀋陽話
Southwestern Mandarin	西南官话	西南官話
• Changde dialect	常德话	常德話
• Chengdu dialect	成都话	成都話
• Chongqing dialect	重庆话	重慶話
• Dali dialect	大理话	大理話
• Guiyang dialect	贵阳话	貴陽話
• Kunming dialect	昆明话	昆明話
• Liuzhou dialect	柳州话	柳州話
• Wuhan dialect	武汉话	武漢話
• Xichang dialect	西昌话	西昌話
• Yichang dialect	宜昌话	宜昌話
• Hanzhong dialect	汉中话	漢中話
Zhongyuan Mandarin	中原官话	中原官話
• Dungan language	东干语	東干語
• Gangou dialect	甘沟话	甘溝語 (influenced by Monguor)
• Kaifeng dialect	开封话	開封話
• Luoyang dialect	洛阳话	洛陽話
• Nanyang dialect	南阳话	南陽話
• Qufu dialect	曲埠话	曲埠話
• Tianshui dialect	天水话	天水話
• Xi'an dialect	西安话	西安話
• Xuzhou dialect	徐州话	徐州話
• Yan'an dialect	延安话	延安話
• Zhengzhou dialect	郑州话	鄭州話
Unclassified		
• Gyami language		
• Junjiahua	军家话	軍家話
• Yangyu dialect	洋屿话	洋嶼話

=== Hui ===
- 徽语/徽語

Sometimes subcategory of Wu.

Jixi Hui	绩溪话	績溪話
Shexian Hui	歙县话	歙縣話
Tunxi Hui	屯溪话	屯溪話
Yixian Hui	黟县话	黟縣話
Xiuning Hui	休宁话	休寧話
Wuyuan Hui	婺源话	婺源話
Dexing Hui	德兴话	德興話
Fuliang Hui	浮梁话	浮梁話
Jiande Hui	建德话	建德話
Shouchang Hui	寿昌话	壽昌話
Chun'an Hui	淳安话	淳安話
Sui'an Hui	遂安话	遂安話
Majin Hui	马金话	馬金話

=== Jin ===
- 晋语/晉語

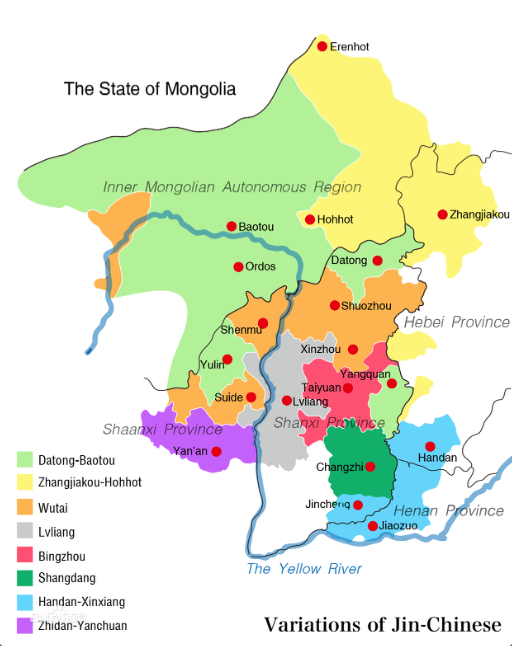
The main dialect areas of Jin in China.

Sometimes a subcategory of Mandarin.

• Baotou dialect	包头话	包頭話
• Datong dialect	大同话	大同話
• Handan dialect	邯郸话	邯郸话
• Hohhot dialect	呼市话	呼市話
• Taiyuan dialect	太原话	太原話
• Xinxiang dialect	新乡话	新鄉話

=== Hakka ===
- 客家话/客家話

• Huizhou (Hakka) dialect	惠州客家话	惠州客家話
• Meizhou dialect	梅州客家话	梅州客家話
• Wuhua dialect	五华客家话	五華客家話
• Xingning dialect	兴宁客家话	興寧客家話
• Pingyuan dialect	平远客家话	平遠客家話
• Jiaoling dialect	蕉岭客家话	蕉嶺客家話
• Dabu dialect	大埔客家话	大埔客家話
• Fengshun dialect	丰顺客家话	豐順客家話
• Longyan dialect	龙岩客家话	龍岩客家話
• Lufeng (Hakka) dialect	陆丰客家话	陸豐客家話

=== Min ===
- 闽语/閩語

The main dialect areas of Min in mainland China, Hainan and Taiwan.

Southern Min	闽南语	閩南語
Quanzhang Min (Hokkien)	闽南话（泉漳片	閩南話 (泉漳片)
• Amoy dialect	厦门话	廈門話
• Quanzhou dialect	泉州话	泉州話
• Zhangzhou dialect	漳州话	漳州話
• Longhai dialect	龙海话	龍海話
• Zhangpu dialect	漳浦话	漳浦話
• Anxi dialect	安溪话	安溪話
• Hui'an dialect	惠安话	惠安話
• Tong'an dialect	同安话	同安話
• Jinjiang dialect	晋江话	晉江話
• Nan'an dialect	南安话	南安話
• Yongchun dialect	永春话	永春話
• Taiwanese (see regional variations) (Note: Includes: Central Taiwanese; Northeastern coastal Taiwanese; Northern Taiwanese; Southern Taiwanese)	台湾话	台灣話
• Lan-nang dialect (Philippine Hokkien)	咱人话/咱侬话（菲律宾福建话)	咱人話/咱儂話 (菲律賓福建話)
• Singaporean Hokkien	新加坡福建话	新加坡福建話
• Penang Hokkien	槟城福建话	檳城福建話
• Muar Hokkien	麻坡福建话	麻坡福建話
• Medan Hokkien	棉兰福建话	棉蘭福建話
• Burmese Hokkien	缅甸福建话	緬甸福建話
Teochew Min (Teo-Swa, Chaoshan)	潮汕方言	潮汕方言
• Teochew dialect (Chaozhou)	潮州话	潮州話
• Shantou dialect (Swatow)	汕头话	汕頭話
• Jieyang dialect	揭阳话	揭陽話
• Chaoyang dialect	潮阳话	潮陽話
• Puning dialect	普宁话	普寧話
• Huilai dialect	惠来话	惠來話
• Bangkok Teochew	曼谷潮州话	曼谷潮州話
Longyan Min	龙岩话	龍巖話
Zhenan Min	浙南片	浙南片
Datian Min (disputed: separate Min branch)	大田片	大田片
Haklau Min	海陆丰话	海陸豐話
Zhongshan Min (disputed:separate Min branch)	中山闽语	中山閩語
• Longdu dialect	隆都话	隆都話
• Nanlang dialect	南朗话	南朗話
• Sanxiang dialect	三乡话	三鄉話
• Zhangjiabian dialect	张家边话	張家邊話
Leizhou Min (disputed: separate Min branch)	雷州片	雷州片
• Haikang dialect	海康话	海康話
• Zhanjiang dialect	湛江话	湛江話
Qiong Wen (Hainanese) (disputed: separate Min branch)	海南话（琼文片）	海南話（瓊文片）
• Wenchang dialect	文昌话	文昌話
• Haikou dialect	海口话	海口話
Eastern Min	闽东语	閩東語
• Fuzhou dialect	福州话	福州話
• Fu'an dialect	福安话	福安話
• Fuding dialect	福鼎話	福鼎話
• Xiapu dialect	霞浦话	霞浦話
• Shouning dialect	寿宁话	壽寧話
• Zhouning dialect	周宁话	周寧話
• Ningde dialect	宁德话	寧德話
• Zherong dialect	柘荣话	柘榮話
• Minhou dialect	闽侯话	閩侯話
• Yongtai dialect	永泰话	永泰話
• Minqing dialect	闽清话	閩清話
• Changle dialect	长乐话	長樂話
• Luoyuan dialect	罗源话	羅源話
• Lianjiang dialect	连江话	連江話
• Fuqing dialect	福清话	福清話
• Pingtan dialect	平潭话	平潭話
• Pingnan dialect	屏南话	屏南話
• Gutian dialect	古田话	古田話
Northern Min	闽北语	閩北語
• Jian'ou dialect	建瓯话	建甌話
Shao–Jiang Min	邵将语	邵將語
Central Min	闽中语	閩中語
• Yong'an dialect	永安话	永安話
• Sanming dialect	三明话	三明話
• Sha dialect	沙县话	沙縣話
Pu–Xian Min	莆仙话	莆仙話
• Putian dialect	莆田话	莆田話
• Xianyou dialect	仙游话	仙遊話

=== Wu ===
- 吴语/吳語

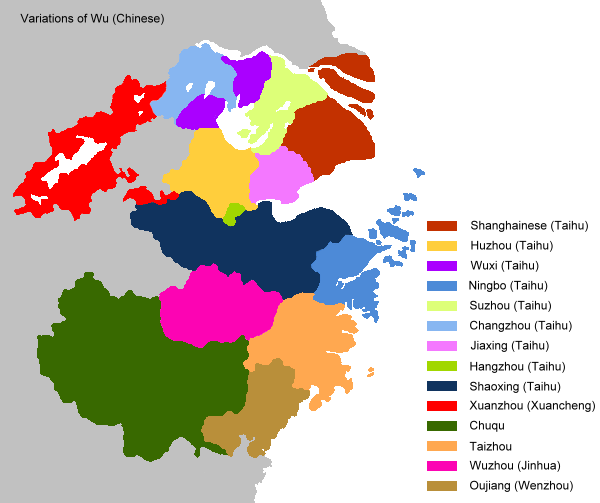
The main dialect areas of Wu in mainland China.

Taihu	太湖片	太湖片
• Shanghai dialect	上海话	上海話
• Suzhou dialect	苏州话	蘇州話
• Changzhou dialect	常州话	常州話
• Wuxi dialect	无锡话	無錫話
• Hangzhou dialect	杭州话	杭州話
• Huzhou dialect	湖州话	湖州話
• Jiaxing dialect	嘉兴话	嘉興話
• Shaoxing dialect	绍兴话	紹興話
• Ningbo dialect	宁波话	寧波話
Taizhou	台州片	台州片
• Taizhou dialect	台州话	台州話
• Linhai dialect	临海话	臨海話
• Sanmen dialect	三门话	三門話
• Tiantai dialect	天台话	天台話
• Xianju dialect	仙居话	仙居話
• Huangyan dialect	黄岩话	黃岩話
• Jiaojiang dialect	椒江话	椒江話
• Wenling dialect	温岭话	溫嶺話
• Yuhuan dialect	玉环话	玉環話
• Ninghai dialect	宁海话	寧海話
Oujiang (Dong'ou)	瓯江（东瓯）片	甌江 (東甌) 片
• Wenzhou dialect	温州话	溫州話
• Yueqing dialect	乐清话	樂清話
• Rui'an dialect	瑞安话	瑞安話
• Wencheng dialect	文成话	文成話
Wuzhou	婺州片选	婺州片
• Jinhua dialect	金华话	金華話
• Lanxi dialect	兰溪话	蘭溪話
• Pujiang dialect	浦江话	浦江話
• Yiwu dialect	义乌话	義烏話
• Dongyang dialect	东阳话	東陽話
• Pan'an dialect	磐安话	磐安話
• Yongkang dialect	永康话	永康話
• Wuyi dialect	武义话	武義話
• Jiande dialect	建德话	建德話
Chuqu	处衢片	處衢片
• Lishui dialect	丽水话	麗水話
• Qingtian dialect	青田话	青田話
• Quzhou dialect	衢州话	衢州話
• Shangrao dialect	上饶话	上饒話
Xuanzhou	宣州片	宣州片
• Xuancheng dialect	宣城话	宣城話

=== Xiang ===
- 湘语/湘語

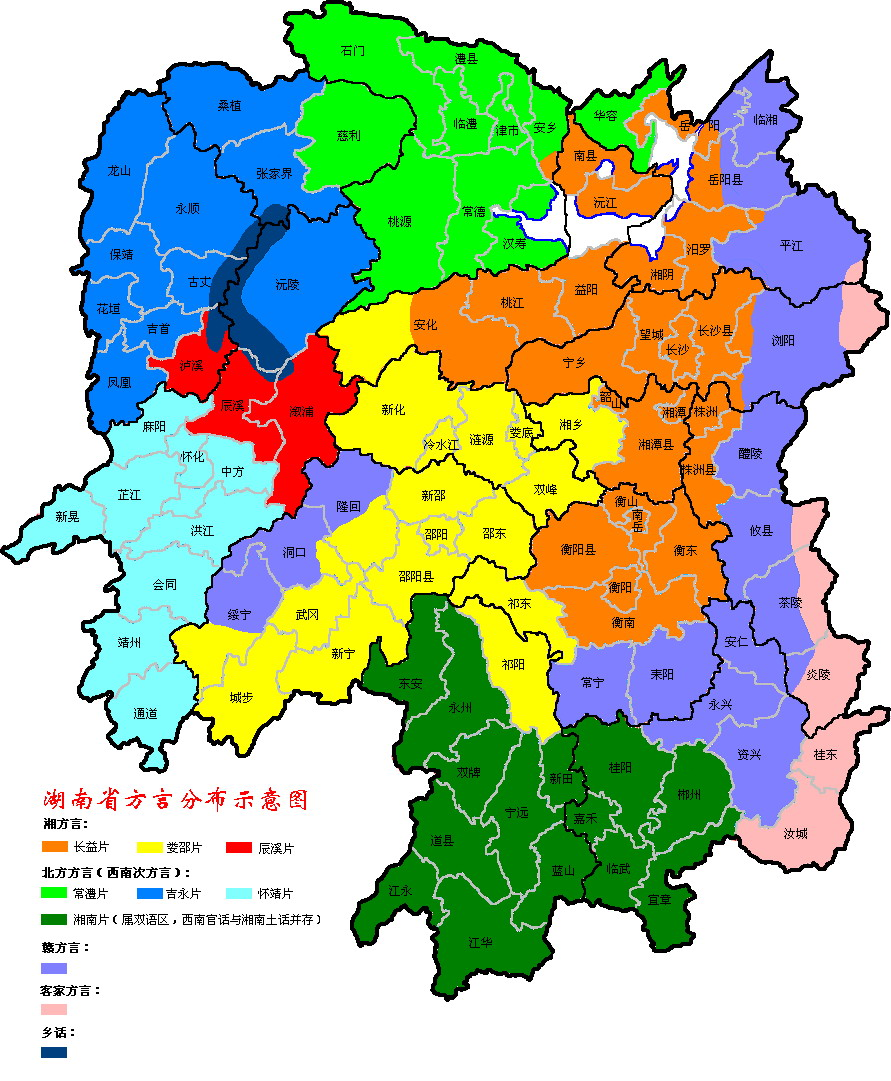
Language map of Hunan Province. New Xiang is orange, Old Xiang yellow, and Chen-Xu Xiang red. Non-Xiang languages are (clockwise from top right) Gan (purple), Hakka (pink along the right), Xiangnan Tuhua (dark green), Waxianghua (dark blue on the left), and Southwestern Mandarin (light blue, medium blue, light green on the left; part of dark green).

Chang–Yi Xiang (New Xiang)	长益片	長益片
• Changsha dialect	长沙话	長沙話
• Zhuzhou dialect	株洲话	株洲話
• Xiangtan dialect	湘潭话	湘潭話
• Ningxiang dialect	宁乡话	寧鄉話
• Yiyang dialect	益阳话	益陽話
• Xiangyin dialect	湘阴话	湘陰話
• Miluo dialect	汨罗话	汨羅話
• Yueyang dialect	岳阳话	岳陽話
Hengzhou Xiang (Hengzhou Xiang)	衡州片	衡州片
• Hengyang dialect	衡阳话	衡陽話
• Hengshan dialect	衡山话	衡山話
• Hengdong dialect	衡东话	衡東話
Lou–Shao Xiang (Old Xiang)	娄邵片	婁邵片
• Loudi dialect	娄底话	婁底話
• Shuangfeng dialect	双峰话	雙峰話
• Xinhua dialect	新化话	新化話
• Xiangxiang dialect	湘乡话	湘鄉話
• Shaoyang dialect	邵阳话	邵陽話
• Shaodong dialect	邵东话	邵東話
• Wugang dialect	武冈话	武岡話
• Qidong dialect	祁东话	祁東話
• Qiyang dialect	祁阳话	祁陽話
Chen–Xu Xiang (Chen-Xu Xiang)	辰溆片	辰漵片
• Chenxi dialect	辰溪话	辰溪話
• Xupu dialect	溆浦话	漵浦話
• Luxi dialect	泸溪话	瀘溪話
Yongquan Xiang (Yong-Quan Xiang)	永全片	永全片
• Yongzhou dialect	永州话	永州話
• Quanzhouxian dialect	全州话	全州話

=== Yue ===
- 粤语/粵語

Distribution of Pinghua and Yue dialect groups in Guangxi and Guangdong: Guibei (N Pinghua) / Gou–Lou; Guinan (S Pinghua) / Guangfu (Yuehai); / Siyi; Yong–Xun / Gao–Yang; Qin–Lian / Wu–Hua

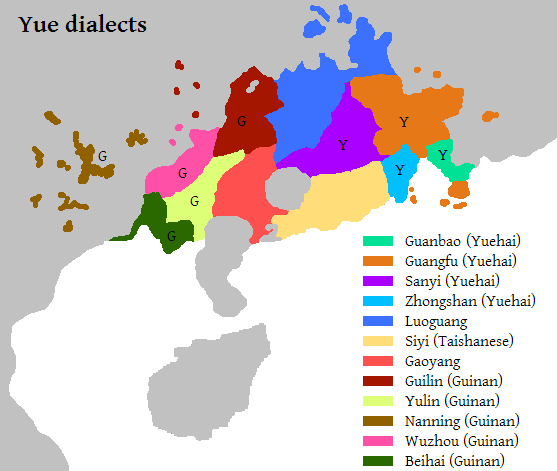
The main dialect areas of Cantonese (Yue) in mainland China, Hong Kong, Macau.

Yuehai	粤海方言	粵海方言
Cantonese (Guangfu)	广府话, 广州话, 广东话	廣府話, 廣州話, 廣東話
• Hong Kong Cantonese	香港粵语	香港粵語
• Malaysian Cantonese	马来西亚粵语	馬來西亞粵語
• Wuzhou dialect	梧州话	梧州話
• Tanka dialect	蜑家话	蜑家話
• Xiguan dialect	西关话	西關話
Sanyi dialect (Samyap)	三邑方言/南番順方言	
• Nanhai dialect	南海话	南海話
• Jiujiang Cantonese	九江白话	九江白話
• Xiqiao dialect	西樵话	西樵話
• Panyu dialect	番禺话	番禺話
• Shunde dialect	顺德话	順德話
Zhongshan dialect	中山方言/香山方言	
• Shiqi dialect	石岐话	石岐話
• Sanjiao dialect	三角话	三角話
Guan-Bao dialect	莞宝方言	莞寶方言
• Dongguan dialect	东莞话	東莞話
• Bao'an dialect (Waitau dialect)	宝安话/围头话	寶安話/圍頭話
Yong–Xun Yue (Jungcam)	邕浔方言	邕潯方言
• Nanning dialect	南宁话	南寧話
• Yongning dialect	邕宁话	邕寧話
• Guiping dialect	桂平话	桂平話
• Chongzuo dialect	崇左话	崇左話
• Ningmin dialect	宁明话	寧明話
• Hengxian dialect	横县话	橫縣話
• Baise dialect	百色话	百色話
Goulou Yue (Ngaulau)	勾漏方言	
• Yulin dialect	玉林话	玉林話
• Guangning dialect	广宁话	廣寧話
• Huaiji dialect	怀集话	懷集話
• Fengkai dialect	封开话	封開話
• Deqing dialect	德庆话	德慶話
• Yunan dialect	郁南话	郁南話
• Shanglin dialect	上林白话	上林白話
• Binyang dialect	宾阳话	賓陽話
• Tengxian dialect	藤县话	藤縣話
Luo–Guang Yue	罗广方言	羅廣方言
• Luoding dialect	罗定话	羅定話
• Zhaoqing dialect	肇庆话	肇慶話
• Sihui dialect	四会话	四會話
• Yangshan dialect	阳山话	陽山話
• Lianzhou dialect	连州话	連州話
• Lianshan dialect	连山话	連山話
• Qingyuan dialect	清远话	清遠話
Siyi Yue (Seiyap)	四邑方言	
• Taishan dialect	台山话	台山話
• Xinhui dialect	新会话	新會話
• Siqian dialect	司前话	司前話
• Guzhen dialect	古镇话	古鎮話
• Enping dialect	恩平话	恩平話
• Kaiping dialect	开平话	開平話
Gao–Yang Yue	高阳方言	高陽方言
• Gaozhou dialect	高州话	高州話
• Yangjiang dialect	阳江话	陽江話
Qin–Lian Yue (Jamlim)	钦廉方言	欽廉方言
• Beihai dialect	北海话	北海話
• Qinzhou dialect	钦州话	欽州話
• Fangchenggang dialect	防城港话	防城港話
• Lianzhou dialect	廉州话	廉州話
• Lingshan dialect	灵山话	靈山話
Wu–Hua Yue (Ngfaa)	吴化方言	吳化方言
• Wuchuan dialect	吴川话	吳川話
• Huazhou dialect	化州话	化州話

=== Pinghua ===
- 平话/平話

Guibei Pinghua (Northern Ping)	桂北平话	桂北平話
• Tongdao Pinghua	通道平话	通道平話
Guinan Pinghua (Southern Ping)	桂南平话	桂南平話

=== Ba-Shu ===
- 巴蜀语/巴蜀語

Ba-Shu Chinese	巴蜀语	巴蜀語
Minjiang dialect (?)	岷江话	岷江話

=== Other ===
The non-Min dialects of Hainan were once considered Yue, but are now left unclassified:

Hainan "Yue"	海南方言	
• Danzhou dialect	儋州话	儋州話
• Mai dialect	迈话	邁話

=== Mixed languages ===
In addition to the varieties within the Sinitic branch of Sino-Tibetan, a number of mixed languages also exist that comprise elements of one or more Chinese varieties with other languages.

Linghua	伶话	伶話	A Mandarin Chinese and Miao mixed language
Maojia	猫家话	貓家話	A Qo-Xiong Miao and Chinese dialects mixed language
Shaozhou Tuhua	韶州土话	韶州土話	A group of distinctive Chinese dialects in South China, including Yuebei Tuhua and Xiangnan Tuhua. It incorporates several Chinese dialects, as well as Yao languages.
Tangwang	唐汪话	唐汪話	A Mandarin Chinese and Dongxiang mixed language
Waxiang	瓦乡话	瓦鄉話	An independent Chinese language variety
Wutun	五屯话	五屯話	A Mandarin Chinese, Tibetan and Mongolian mixed language

== List in the Atlas ==
The extensive 1987 Language Atlas of China groups Chinese local varieties into the following units:

- Supergroup (大区 dàqū), of which there are but two: Mandarin and Min
- Group (区 qū), corresponding to the varieties of Chinese of the ISO standard
- Subgroup (片 piàn), which may be mutually unintelligible with other subgroups (Note: For example, though the Southwestern Mandarin of Chengdu is intelligible to speakers of Standard Chinese, other local variants of Southwestern Mandarin may not be mutually intelligible to each other.)
- Cluster (小片 xiǎopiàn), which may be mutually unintelligible with other clusters
- Local dialect (点 diǎn), which are the dialects sampled by the Atlas

In the list below, local dialects are not listed. Groups are in bold, subgroups are numbered, and clusters are bulleted.

Northeastern Mandarin

1. Jishen
  - Jiaoning
  - Tongxi
  - Yanji
2. Hafu
  - Zhaofu
  - Changjin
3. Heisong
  - Nenke
  - Jiafu
  - Zhanhua

Jilu Mandarin

1. Baotang
  - Laifu
  - Dingba
  - Tianjin
  - Jizun
  - Luanchang
  - Fulong
2. Shiji
  - Zhaoshen
  - Xingheng
  - Liaotai
3. Canghui
  - Huangle
  - Yangshou
  - Juzhao
  - Zhanghuan

Beijing Mandarin

1. Jingshi
2. Huaicheng
3. Chaofeng
4. Shike

Jiaoliao Mandarin

1. Qingzhou
2. Denglian
3. Gaihuan

Central Plains Mandarin

1. Zhengcao
2. Cailu
3. Luoxu
4. Xinbeng
5. Fenhe
  - Pingyang
  - Jiangzhou
  - Xiezhou
6. Guanzhong
7. Qinlong
8. Longzhong
9. Nanjiang

Lanyin Mandarin

1. Jincheng
2. Yinwu
3. Hexi
4. Tami

Southwestern Mandarin

1. Chengyu
2. Dianxi
  - Yaoli
  - Baolu
3. Qianbei
4. Kungui
5. Guanchi
  - Minjiang
  - Renfu
  - Yamian
  - Lichuan
6. Ebei
7. Wutian
8. Cenjiang
9. Qiannan
10. Xiangnan
11. Guiliu
12. Changhe

Jianghuai Mandarin

1. Hongchao
2. Tairu
3. Huangxiao

(unclassified Mandarin)

1. Hubeihua
2. Henanhua
3. Nanping dialect
4. Yangyu dialect
5. Junhua
6. Longmen dialect

Jin

1. Bingzhou
2. Lüliang
  - Fenzhou
  - Xingxi
3. Shangdang
4. Wutai
5. Dabao
6. Zhanghu
7. Hanxin
  - Cizhang
  - Huoji
8. Zhiyan

Wu

1. Taihu
  - Piling
  - Suhujia
  - Tiaoxi
  - Hangzhou
  - Linshao
  - Yongjiang
2. Taizhou
3. Oujiang
4. Wuzhou
5. Chuqu
  - Chuzhou
  - Longqu
6. Xuanzhou
  - Tongjin
  - Taigao
  - Shiling

Hui

1. Jishe
2. Xiuyi
3. Qide
4. Yanzhou
5. Jingzhan

Gan

1. Changjing
2. Yiliu
3. Jicha
4. Fuguang
5. Yingyi
6. Datong
7. Leizi
8. Dongsui
9. Huaiyue

Xiang

1. Changyi
2. Loushao
3. Jixu

Yue

1. Guangfu
2. Yongxun
3. Gaoyang
4. Siyi
5. Goulou
6. Wuhua
7. Qinlian

Pinghua

1. Guibei
2. Guinan

Hakka

1. Yuetai
  - Jiaying
  - Xinghua
  - Xinhui
  - Shaonan
2. Yuezhong
3. Huizhou
4. Yuebei
5. Tingzhou
6. Ninglong
7. Yugui
8. Tonggu

Southern Min

1. Zaytonese (Quanzhang / Hokkien / Taiwanese / Minnan)
2. Hinghua (Puxian / Putianese)
3. Beitou (Quanpu / Zuanpo)
4. Liong-na (Longyan)
5. Datian (Duacan / Qianluhua)
6. Taoyuan
7. Teochew (Chaoshan / Chaozhou)
8. Sanxiang (Zhongshan Minnan)
9. Luichow (Leizhou)
10. Hainanese (Qiongwen)

Eastern Min

1. Fuqing (S. Houguan)
2. Foochow (C. Houguan)
3. Kutien (Gutian / N. Houguan)
4. Songkou (Yangzhong / W. Houguan / S. Minqing / W. Yongtai)
5. Ningde (S. Funing)
6. Fu'an (C. Funing)
7. Xiapu (E. Funing)
8. Fuding (N. Funing)
9. Taishun (Manjiang)
10. Cangnan (Manhua)
11. Longtu (Longdu)
12. Nanlang

Western Min

1. Jianzhou (Jianou / Nanping / Minbei)
2. Shaojiang
3. Yongan (Minzhong)
4. Xinqiao (Chitian / Houluhua / Wenjiang)

Central Min

1. Youxi (Chengguan)
2. Xibin
3. Zhongxian (Jihua)

Unclassified topolects

- Shanke dialect (the Chinese variety now spoken by the She people)
- Danzhou dialect
- Xianghua
- Shaoguan Tuhua
- Xiangnan (Southern Hunan) Tuhua

== Remnants of Old Yue Language in Chinese Dialects ==
Dialect	Example word(s)	Meaning
Cantonese	呢 / 嗰 (ni / go2)	this / that
Cantonese	度 (dou6)	place
Cantonese	嘥 (saai1)	to waste
Cantonese	踎 (mau4)	to squat
Cantonese	呃 (aak1)	to deceive
Cantonese	曱甴 (gaat6 zaat6)	cockroach
Cantonese	蛤乸 (gaap6 naa5)	frog
Cantonese	啱 (ngaam1)	just right
Min	虼蠽	cockroach
Min	蚼蚁	ant
Min	交懔损	to shiver (with cold)
Min	著咳嗾	to choke (on smoke/dust)
Min	查埔 / 查某 (tsa-poo / tsa-bóo)	man / woman
Min	某 (bóo)	wife
Min	叨位 (to-ūi)	where
Min	古锥 (kóo-tuinn)	cute
Wu	厘儿	a small amount
Wu	薸 (bieu)	duckweed
Hakka	ni	this
Gan	扤 (wut)	to do / to make / to mess with

== See also ==
- Varieties of Chinese
- Written Chinese
