= Xiangxiang dialect =

Xiang Chinese dialect of Hunan, China

- 湘乡话
- Native to: China
- Region: Xiangxiang, Hunan province
- Language family: Sino-Tibetan: Sinitic; Xiang; Loushao; Xiangxiang dialect

Language codes
- ISO 639-3: –

The Xiangxiang dialect (Chinese: 湘乡话; pinyin: Xiāngxiānghuà) is a dialect of Xiang Chinese, spoken in Xiangxiang, Hunan province, China. It is part of a group of dialects called the Central Xiang dialects.

== Geographic distribution ==
The linguistic maps below are derived from the Digital Language Atlas of China, which is derived from the Language Atlas of China, the first atlas to comprehensively catalog and chart the distribution of Chinese dialects. This atlas refers to the two main dialects in Xiangxiang City and its surroundings as Changyi (长益片 / 長益片) and Loushao (娄邵片 / 婁邵片).

The division of Xiang into New Xiang and Old Xiang was introduced by Yuan Jiahua, but has been superseded by the Language Atlas of China classifications.

Dialect map of Hunan Province according to the Language Atlas of China

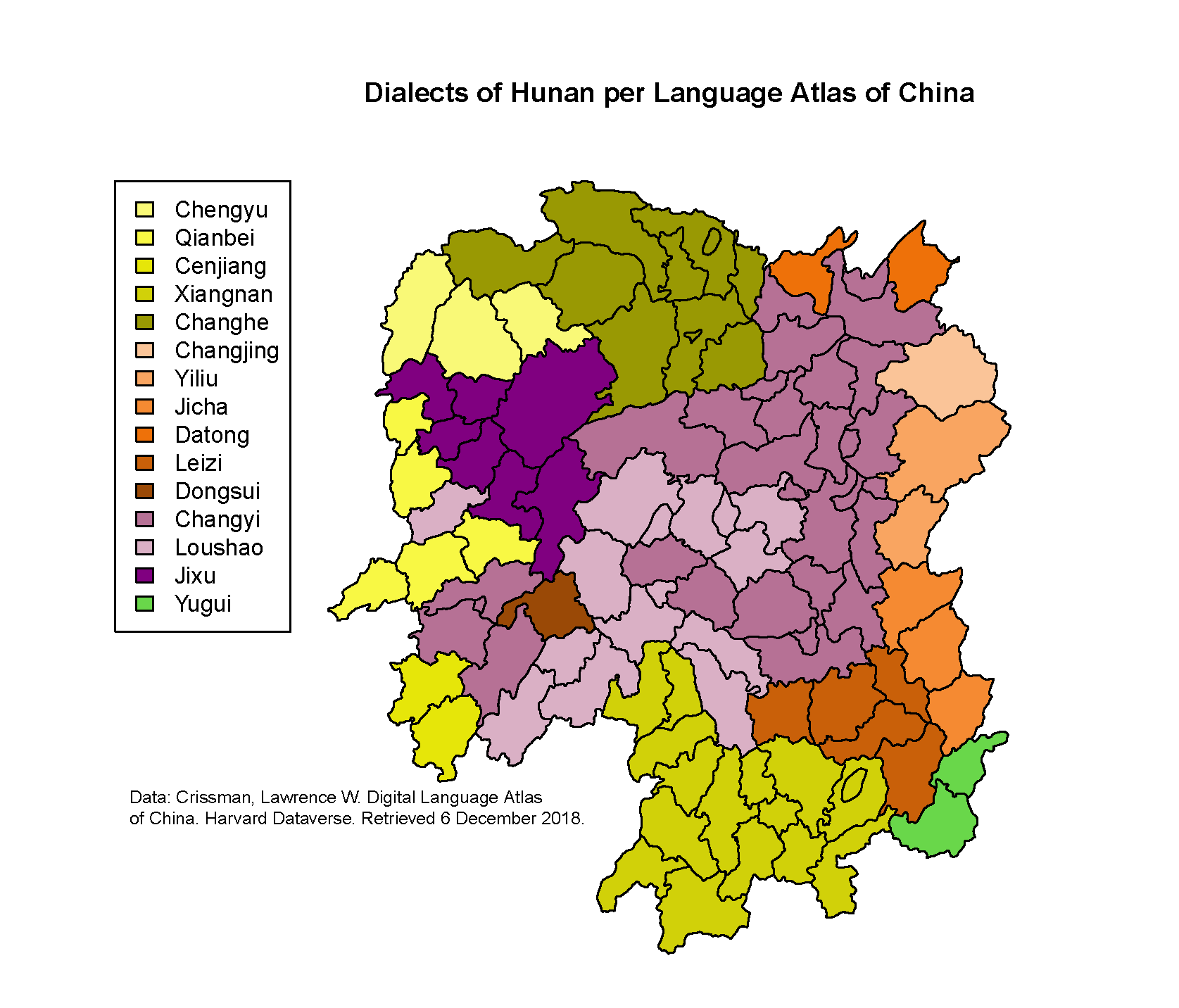

The Language Atlas of China serves as the starting point for many efforts to further detail, map and classify Xiang dialects, including the many studies of Bao Houxing and Chen Hui.

Dialect map of Hunan Province according to Chen and Bao (2007)

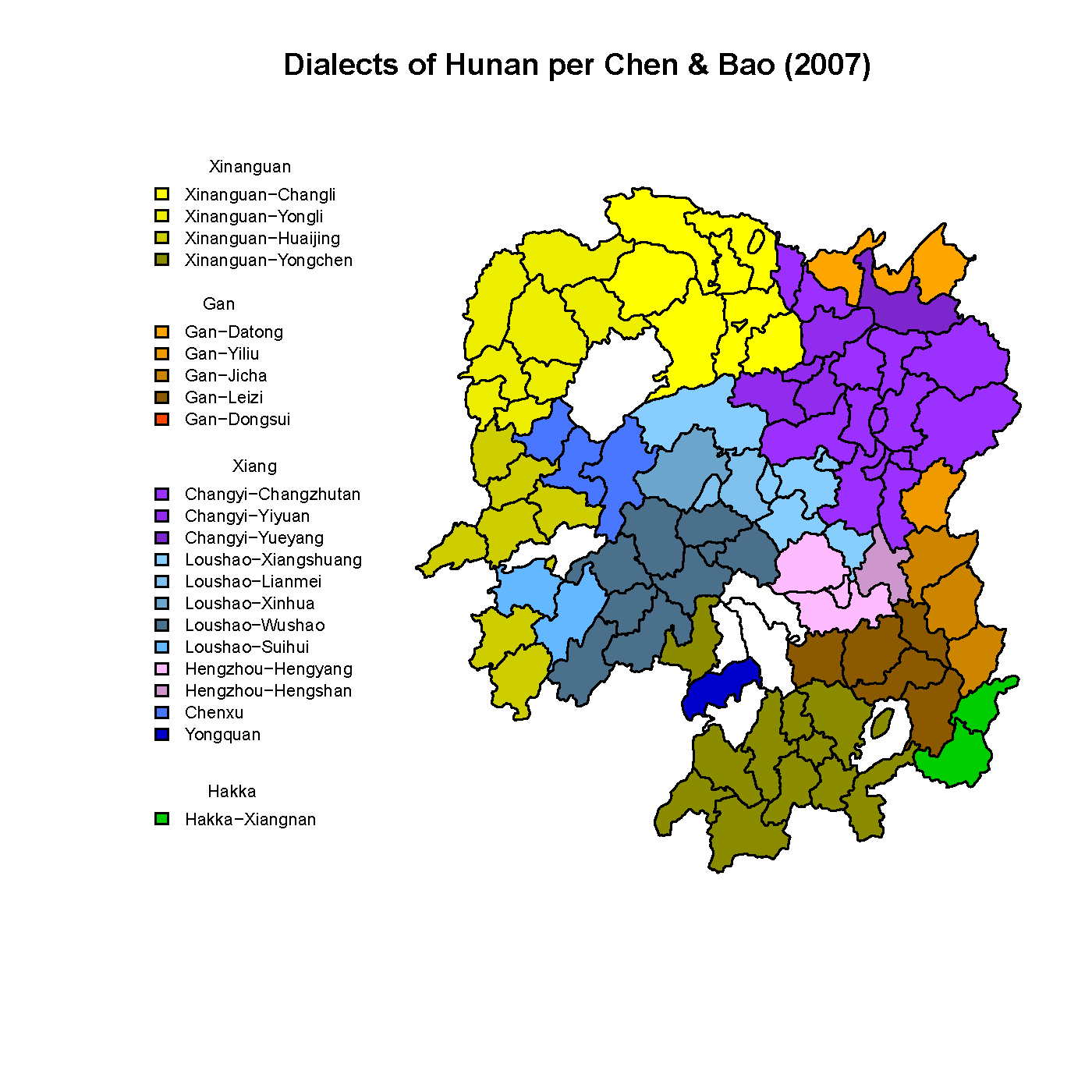

Linguistic map of Xianxiang City and surrounding counties

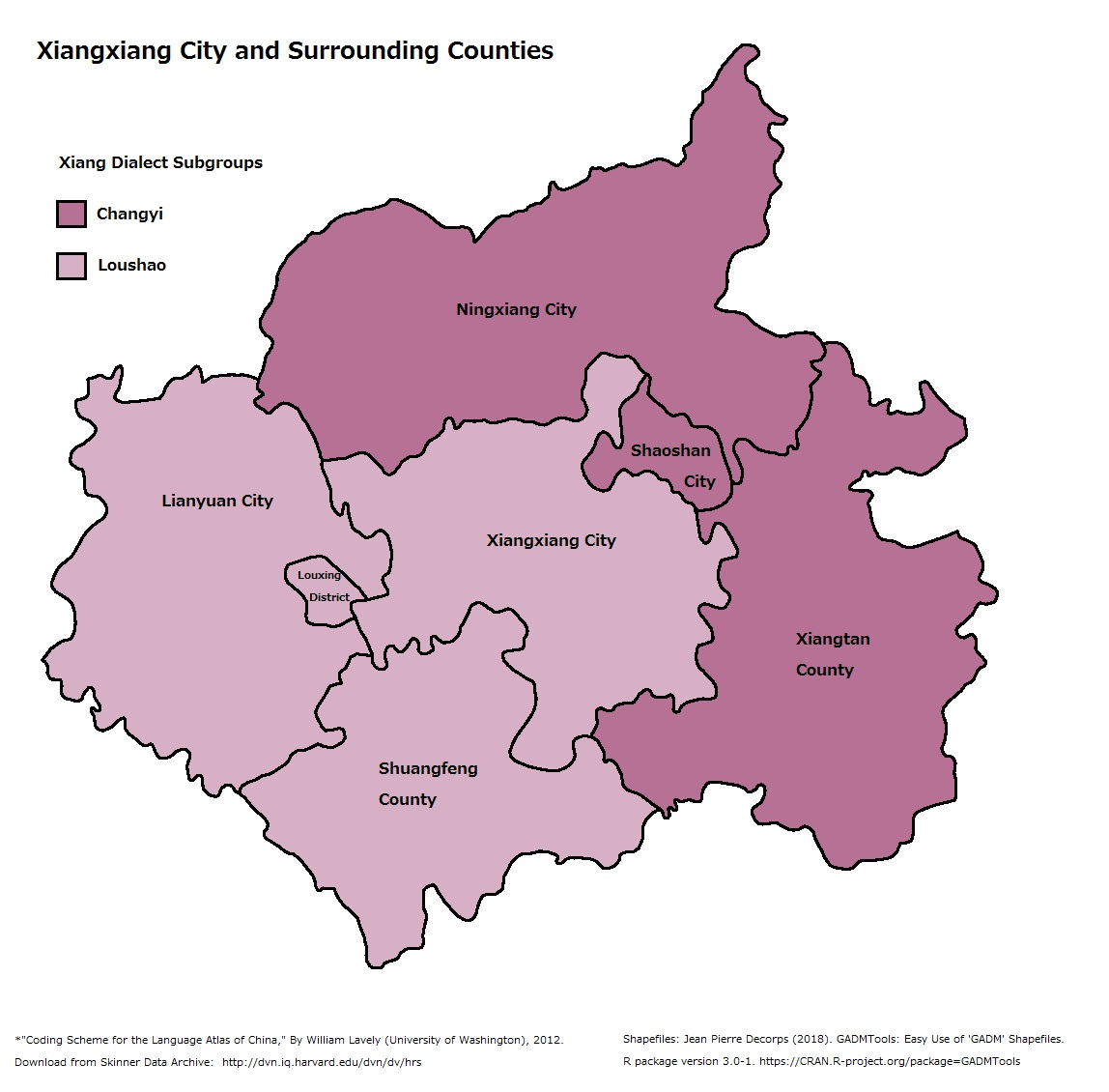

Sample Locations of Xiangxiang Dialect Studies

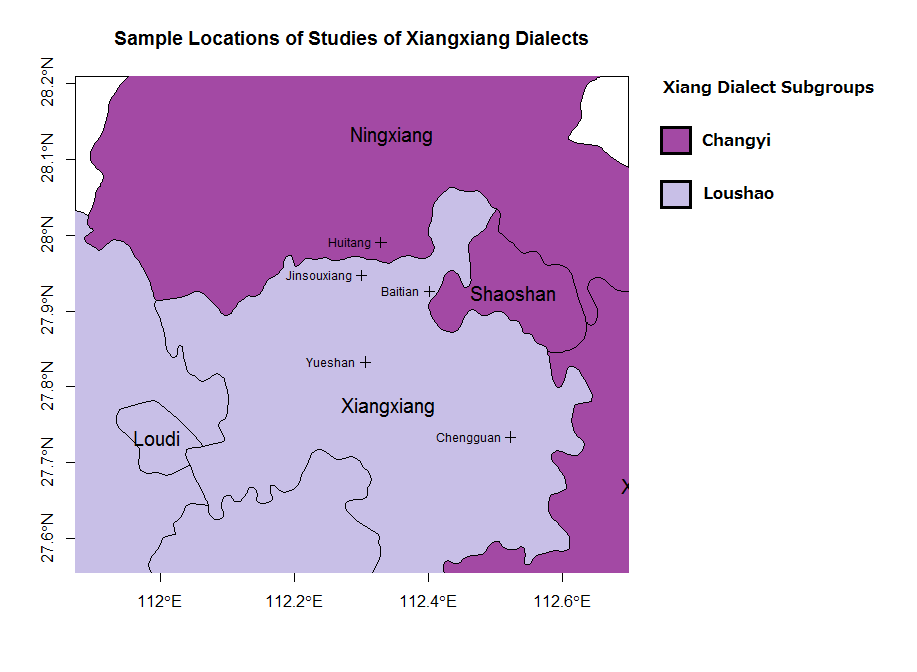

== History and strategic value ==
The Xiang dialect group forms a transitional zone between northern and southern Chinese dialects.

Prehistorically, the main inhabitants were Ba, Nanman, Baiyue and other tribes whose languages cannot be studied. During the Warring States Period, large numbers of Chu migrated into Hunan. Their language blended with that of the original natives to produce a new dialect Nanchu (Southern Chu). The culture of Xiangxiang at the center of Hunan is considered to be mainly Chu. The language of Shaoshan, Loudi, Shuangfeng and Xiangxiang (Old Xiang) is considered as originating from a synthesis of Chu and the languages of original natives.

Migrations into Hunan can be divided into three periods. Before the Five Dynasties and Ten Kingdoms period, migrants came mainly from the North. Between the Five Dynasties and Ten Kingdoms period and the Ming dynasty, migrants came mainly from Jiangxi. In the early Ming dynasty, large numbers of migrants came from Jiangxi and settled in present day Yueyang, Changsha, Zhuzhou, Xiangtan, and Hengyang districts. Migrants from Jiangxi concentrated mainly in southeastern Hunan and present day Shaoyang and Xinhua districts. They came for two reasons: the first is that Jiangxi became too crowded and its people sought expansion. The second is that Hunan suffered greatly during the Mongol conquest of the Song dynasty, when there was mass slaughter, and needed to replenish its population. After the middle of the Ming dynasty, migration gradually became more diverse and economically and commercially motivated. Migrants who came from the North settled mainly in northern Hunan followed by western Hunan. For this reason northern and western Hunan are Mandarin districts.

== Phonology ==
=== Comparison with Standard Chinese ===
Comparison of Xiangxiang Area Loushao and Changyi Dialects with Standard Chinese
Feature	Standard Chinese		Xiangxiang Locations				Ninxiang Location
Feature	Dictionary	Chao	Chengguan	Yueshan	Jinsou	Baitian	Huitang
Consonants and Initials	21	23	29	28	24	26	24
Vowels and Finals	35	37	37	38	42	37	38
Tones	4	4	7	5	6	6	6

=== General ===
These phonetic charts use IPA phonetic symbols with the addition of curly-tail alveolo-palatal symbols and follow the format set forth by Chao.

==== Consonants ====
Consonants of the Xiangxiang dialect
		bilabial	alveolar	denti-alveolar	alveolo-palatal	retroflex	velar
nasal		m	n		ȵ		ŋ
plosives	voiced	b	d				ɡ
plosives	voiceless unaspirated	p	t				k
plosives	voiceless aspirated	pʰ	tʰ				kʰ
fricatives	voiced						ɣ
fricatives	voiceless			s	ɕ	ʂ	x
affricates	voiced			dz	dʑ	dʐ	
affricates	voiceless unaspirated			ts	tɕ	tʂ	
affricates	voiceless aspirated			tsʰ	tɕʰ	tʂʰ	
lateral approximants			l				

==== Tones ====
Phonemically, Xiangxiang dialect has seven tones.

Tone chart of the Xiangxiang dialect
Tone number	Tone name	Tone contour	Description
1	yin ping (陰平)	˥ (55)	high
2	yang ping (陽平)	˩˧ (13)	extra low rising
2'	ci yang ping (次陽平)	˨˧ (23)	low rising
3	shang sheng (上聲)	˨˩ (21)	low
5	yin qu (陰去)	˦˥ (45)	high rising
5'	ci yin qu (次陰去)	˧˥ (35)	high rising
6	yang qu (陽去)	˧ (33)	mid

=== Jinsou Town ===
==== Consonants ====
Consonants of the Xiangxiang dialect, Jinsou Town
		bilabial	alveolar	denti-alveolar	alveolo-palatal	retroflex	velar	Laryngeal
nasal		m	n		ȵ		ŋ	
plosives	voiced	b	d				ɡ	
plosives	voiceless unaspirated	p	t				k	Ø 油
plosives	voiceless aspirated	pʰ	tʰ				kʰ	
fricatives	voiced						ɣ	
fricatives	voiceless			s	ɕ	ʂ		x
affricates	voiced			dz	dʑ	dʐ		
affricates	voiceless unaspirated			ts	tɕ	tʂ		
affricates	voiceless aspirated			tsʰ	tɕʰ	tʂʰ		
lateral approximants			l					

=== Yueshan Town ===
==== Tones ====
Tone chart of the Xiangxiang dialect, Yueshan Town
Tone number	Tone name	Tone contour	Description
1	yin ping (陰平)	˥ (55)	high
2	yang ping (陽平)	˩˧ (13)	low rising
3	shang sheng (上聲)	˨˩ (21)	low
4	yin qu (陰去)	˦˥ (45)	high rising
5	yang qu (陽去)	˨ (22)	mid

== See also ==
- Xiang Chinese
- List of Chinese dialects

== Bibliography ==
- Hunan Sheng difangzhi bianzuan weiyuanhui 湖南省地方志编纂委员会 (2001). Húnán shěngzhì, dì-èrshíwǔ juǎn, fāngyán zhì, shàngcè 湖南省志，第二十五卷，方言志，上册 (in Chinese). Changsha: Hunan renmin chubanshe.
- Li, Jialong 李加龙 (2017). Hànyǔ fāngyán diàochá 汉语方言调查 (in Chinese). Beijing: Shangwu yinshuguan. ISBN 978-7-100-12869-8.
- "Húnán fāngyán zhōng tā zuì nán dǒng bèi chēng wèi "Húnán de wàiguóhuà"" 湖南方言中它最难懂 被称为"湖南的外国话" (in Chinese). Xiāoxiāng chénbào. 3 April 2017.
