= Hengyang dialect =

Overview of a variety of Chinese spoken in Hunan province

- 衡阳
- Native to: China
- Region: Hengyang, Hunan province
- Language family: Sino-Tibetan: Sinitic; Xiang; New Xiang; Hengyang dialect

Language codes
- ISO 639-3: –

The Hengyang dialect of Xiang Chinese (Chinese: 衡阳方言; pinyin: Héngyáng fāngyán, xəŋ˨˦ jaŋ˨˦ faŋ˥ jɛn˨˦; Dialect pronunciation: xen˩ jan˩ fan˦˥ njen˩) is the variety of Chinese native to the city of Hengyang, Hunan province. It is a member of the Xiang group, usually subgrouped with the New Xiang dialects (along with Changsha and Yiyang). More recently it has been proposed to classify this dialect with its close relatives as an independent branch of Xiang, termed Hengzhou.

== Status ==
The dialect is spoken in the urban districts as well as Hengyang County and Hengnan County. The urban Hengyang dialect is significantly influenced by Southwestern Mandarin. It is closely related to the dialect of Hengdong County, also classified as New Xiang.

== Classification ==
The Hengyang dialect is a variety of Xiang Chinese, which is spoken primarily in Hunan and northern Guangxi, China. It is typical of Xiang varieties in its lack of retroflex initials, 6 lexical tones (including a reflex of the Middle Chinese entering tone), and use of diminutive and nominative affixes not found in Standard Mandarin, among other distinctive features (see Wu 2005 for an overview).

Xiang is traditionally divided into two large subgroups based on shared retention or loss of the voiced obstruents of Middle Chinese; the Old Xiang varieties (primarily spoken in southwest Hunan and northern Guangxi) preserve voicing to varying degrees, while the New Xiang varieties (primarily spoken in northeast Hunan) have merged the voiced obstruents into the unaspirated series. The Hengyang dialect is usually treated as belonging to the second group owing to its loss of these voiced initials. This taxonomy was first proposed by Yuan Jiahua in 1960.

The following examples from Chen (2006: 26-32) illustrate the criteria for classification, with Middle Chinese forms from Baxter & Sagart (2014):

| Lexical Item | Middle Chinese | Chengbu | Changsha | Hengyang |
|---|---|---|---|---|
| 白 'white' | baek^{D} | bə˧ | pə˨˦ | pe˩ |
| 读 'read' | duwk^{D} | du˧ | təu˨˦ | tu˩ |
| 昨 'yesterday' | dzak^{D} | dzo˧ | tso˩˧ | tso˩ |

More recent work has complicated this dichotomy. In particular, Chen and Bao (2007, 2012) have proposed a five-way subgrouping of Xiang based on novel lexical criteria, which posits that the Hengyang dialect belongs to its own Hengzhou grouping. The following lexical items are proposed as definitional criteria: /tɕi˧/ as the third person pronoun, /lai˧-tɕi˧/ for 'boy', and /ma˧-ko˨/ for 'what'. The Hengzhou grouping also includes closely related dialects such as Hengdong (衡东) and Hengshan (衡山). This approach implies that the Hengzhou grouping represents a transitional region within Xiang Chinese.

== Phonology ==
The phonology is summarized below, following two published descriptions of Hengyang Xiang. As per convention in Sinitic dialectology, the phonological analysis is organized into Initials (声母), Finals or Rhymes (韵母), and Tones (声调).

=== Initials ===
| | Labial | Alveolar | Palatal | Velar |
|---|---|---|---|---|
| Nasal | m | n | | ŋ |
| Plosive | p pʰ | t tʰ | | k kʰ |
| Affricate | | ts tsʰ | tɕ tɕʰ | |
| Fricative | f | s | ɕ | x |
| Approximant | w | | j ɥ | |
| Lateral Approximant | | l | | |

Where symbols appear in pairs, the one on the left is unaspirated, while the one on the right is aspirated. This applies for every symbol pair except [j]/[ɥ]; these represent a lip rounding distinction, where [j] is plain and [ɥ] is rounded.

The two sources do not include the plain and labial approximants (collectively, the 'semivowels'), instead marking these as vowels in the inventory of finals. Examples (from Peng 2005): 药 [jo] 'medicine' = [io]; 远 [ɥen] 'far' = [yen]; 王 [wan] 'king' = [uan]; etc. An ancillary consequence of this is the need for a null initial ('ø') for syllables that begin with semivowels, in order for all syllables to conform to the syllabic format: [initial + final + tone].

The palatal obstruents are alveopalatal, involving simultaneous articulation at the hard palate and at the alveolar ridge.

The alveolar and velar obstruents are in complementary distribution with the palatal obstruent series, with the palatals occurring only before high front vowels or the palatal approximant.

=== Finals ===
| | a | o | u | e | ə | i | y | ɿ |
|---|---|---|---|---|---|---|---|---|
| ø | a | o | u | e | ə | i | y | ɿ |
| w | aw | | | | əw | | | |
| j | aj | | | ej | | | | |
| n | an | | | en | ən | in | yn | |
| ŋ | | | | | əŋ | | | |

In addition to the above, there are also two syllabic nasals which may also function as finals; namely [m̩] and [n̩]; some authors have [ŋ̩] for [n̩]. Some authors have rhotacized [ɚ] for final [ə], but other sources support the view that the dialect is non-rhotacizing.

The symbol [ɿ] is not found in the IPA and represents the apical vowel, which occurs exclusively following the alveolar fricative [s] or affricates [ts] and [tsʰ]. It is produced by maintaining the apical constriction of [s] against the alveolar ridge while vibrating the vocal folds to produce voicing, and could therefore also be transcribed as [z̩] using IPA symbols.

=== Tones ===
| Tone Number | Tone Name | Tone Contour | Description |
|---|---|---|---|
| 1 | 阴平 Yinping | ˦˥ (45) | high-rising |
| 2 | 阳平 Yangping | ˩ (11) | low-level |
| 3 | 上声 Shangsheng | ˧ (33) | mid-level |
| 4 | 阴去 Yinqu | ˨˦ (24) | low-rising |
| 5 | 阳去 Yangqu | ˨˩˧ (213) | falling-rising |
| 6 | 入声 Rusheng | ˨ (22) | mid-low level |

Tone 5 tends to shorten from a three-point to a two-point contour in certain contexts; consider 冇 /maw˨˩˧/ 'not' → 冇得 [maw˨˩te˨] 'existential negative'. In addition to the six tones listed above is a default 'neutral' tone found on affixes and clitics, where the pitch contour is supplied by context; this is indicated by simply not adding tone markers.

== Grammar and lexicon ==
This section provides a brief overview of grammatical features of the Hengyang dialect, focusing on features which distinguish the Hengyang dialect from Standard Mandarin and other Xiang varieties.

=== Lexical features ===
Certain lexical features found in the Hengyang dialect are common in other northeastern varieties of Xiang; Standard Mandarin equivalents are listed.

晓得 /ɕiaw˧te˨/ 'to know' (also common in literary and dialectal Mandarin; vernacular standard Mandarin uses 知道 zhīdao)

讲 /kwan˧/ 'to say' (cognates are commonly used in dialectal Mandarin; vernacular standard Mandarin uses 说 shuō)

冇得 /maw˨˩˧te˨/ 'existential negative' (cf 没有 méiyǒu)

啰 /lo˧/ 'final particle indicating suggestion' (cf 吧 ba)

Other items are specific to the Hengyang dialect or the Hengzhou group:

吗咯 /ma˦˥ko˨/ 'what' (cf 什么 shénme)

吗理 /ma˦˥li˧/ 'why' (cf 为什么 wèishénme)

俫 /lai˧/ and 阶 /ka˧/ 'boy' (cf 男孩 nánhái)

The diminutive affix 几 /tɕi/ is a common feature of the Hengyang dialect, discussed in the following section.

=== Morphosyntactic features ===
Personal pronouns include the following (Peng 2005: 118):

| Person | Singular | Plural |
|---|---|---|
| 1 | 我 /ŋo˧/ | 我邻 /ŋo˧-nin/ |
| 2 | 你 /ni˧/ | 你邻 /ni˧-nin/ |
| 3 | 其 /tɕi˧/ | 其邻 /tɕi˧-nin/ |

The personal pronouns are pluralized by adding a suffix /-nin/ to the root, which may also be pronounced /-ni/. Reflexive pronouns are formed by following any of the personal pronouns with 自家 /tsɿ˨˩˧-ka/. An additional pronoun that may be added to the list is 别个 /pje˩-ko/ 'other, others'. Demonstrative pronouns include: 咯 ko˨ 'proximal'; 那 na˨˩˧ 'distal'.

The Hengyang dialect marks perfective aspect with the aspectual particles 哒 /ta˨/ and 咖 /ka˧/, which is typical of many other northeastern ('New') Xiang varieties, such as Changsha and Yiyang. Consider the following examples from Peng (2005: 293-4): 去哒 /kʰe˨˦ ta˨/ 'went/have gone'; 卖咖 /mai˨˩˧ ka˧/ 'sold/have sold'. These particles can also occur in combination in the ordering [ka˧ + ta˨], occurring after the verb:

ŋo˧ tsaj˨˩˧ waj˨˩˧mjen˨˩˧ tɕʰja˨ ka˧ta˨ je˧
1sg be.at outside eat PFV SFP
'I ate/have eaten outside'(297)

Wu (2005) and Peng (2005) remark on the extensive use of the diminutive/nominalizing affix 几 /tɕi/, most often used to mark terms for small humans and animals, but also extended to various other semantic domains as well. It can also occur in combination with the other common nominalizing affix 崽 /tsaj/, which is more widespread in Xiang. Examples:

细 阶崽几
ɕi˨˦ ka˦˥-tsaj-tɕi
small boy-NOM-DIM
'small boy' (136)

老几
law˧-tɕi
old-DIM/NOM
'Old man'(15)

那 前几
na˨˩˧ tɕjen˩-tɕi
DEM before-DIM/NOM
'at that time' (289)

These examples illustrate the use of these affixes on terms for small humans, on adjectives, and time words. In each case, we can see that the accompanying morphology nominalizes the root, allowing it to occupy a nominal slot. This is most clearly evidenced in the third example: the addition of the affix /-tɕi/ allows the time adverbial 'before' to occur within a demonstrative phrase headed by /na˨˩˧/.
