= Wugang dialect =

Old Xiang Chinese dialect

- Chinese: 武岡話
- Native to: China
- Region: Wugang, Hunan province
- Language family: Sino-Tibetan: Sinitic; Xiang; Loushao; Wugang dialect

Language codes
- ISO 639-3: –
- Linguist List: hsn-luo
- Glottolog: None

The Wugang dialect (Wu Kang in Wade–Giles) is an Old Xiang Chinese dialect spoken in Wugang, Hunan in China.

== Classification ==
Wugang is an Old Xiang dialect, related to other Old Xiang dialects such as Shaoyang dialect.

== Geographic distribution ==
The Wugang dialect is spoken in Wugang, Hunan.

== Sub-dialects ==
The Wenping dialect is a sub-dialect of the Wugang dialect.

== Features ==
Wugang words with the D tone are the only words in which devoicing can occur, with voiced stop and fricative initials.

The Wugang dialect is one of the dialects that uses "佢" or "其" as the pronoun for the third person.

== See also ==
- Xiang Chinese
- List of Chinese dialects
