= Shuangfeng dialect =

Dialect of Xiang Chinese

- 雙峰話
- Native to: China
- Region: Shuangfeng, Hunan province
- Language family: Sino-Tibetan: Sinitic; Xiang; Old Xiang (Lou-Shao); Shuangfeng dialect

Language codes
- ISO 639-3: –
- Glottolog: shua1258

The Shuangfeng dialect (simplified Chinese: 双峰话; traditional Chinese: 雙峰話; pinyin: Shuāngfēnghuà) is a dialect of Xiang Chinese, spoken in Shuangfeng County, Hunan province, China.

== Phonology ==
=== Consonants ===
Consonants of the Shuangfeng dialect
		bilabial	alveolar	alveolo-palatal	retroflex	velar
nasal		m	n	ɲ		ŋ
plosives	voiced	b	d			ɡ
plosives	voiceless unaspirated	p	t			k
plosives	voiceless aspirated	pʰ	tʰ			kʰ
fricatives	voiced					ɣ
fricatives	voiceless		s	ɕ	ʂ	x
affricates	voiced		dz	dʑ	dʐ	
affricates	voiceless unaspirated		ts	tɕ	tʂ	
affricates	voiceless aspirated		tsʰ	tɕʰ	tʂʰ	
lateral approximants			l			

=== Vowels ===
Vowels/Combinations of the Shuangfeng dialect
		Oral						Nasal			
Medial		∅	coda	a	e	i	u	n	ŋ	∅	i
Nucleus	∅						əu		ɒŋ	æ̃	
Nucleus	Vowel	i		ia	ie			iɛn	iɒŋ	ĩ	iĩ
Nucleus	Vowel	y		ya	ye			yɛn			
Nucleus	Vowel	a						an			
Nucleus	Vowel	e									
Nucleus	Vowel	o	io								
Nucleus	Vowel	ɤ	iɤ								
Nucleus	Vowel	ʊ	iʊ								
Nucleus	Vowel	u		ua	ue	ui		uan			uĩ
Syllabic		ɹ̩						n̩		m̩	
Syllabic		ɻ̩									

=== Tones ===
Phonemically, Shuangfeng dialect has three tones. Phonetically, however, the pitch of a syllable depends on the voicing of the initial consonant so the tones are counted as five:

Tone chart of the Shuangfeng dialect
Tone number	Tone name	Tone contour	Description
1	yin ping (陰平)	˥ (55)	high
2	yang ping (陽平)	˨˧ (23)	low rising
3	shang sheng (上聲)	˨˩ (21)	low
4	yin qu (陰去)	˧˥ (35)	high rising
5	yang qu (陽去)	˧ (33)	mid

== See also ==
- Xiang Chinese
- List of Chinese dialects
