= Goulou (disambiguation) =

Goulou may refer to:

- Goulou, an ancient Korean tribal state.
- Goulou Yue, one of the principal groups of Yue dialects around the Guangxi–Guangdong border, including the dialects of Yulin and Bobai.
- Goulou, Hengyang (岣嵝乡), a township of Hengyang County, Hunan.
