= Chinese phonology =

Chinese phonology is covered by the following articles:

- Concerning modern Chinese:
  - Standard Chinese phonology
  - Cantonese phonology
  - For the phonology of other varieties of Chinese, see the articles on the particular varieties
  - For an overview, see Varieties of Chinese → Phonology
- Concerning pre-modern Chinese:
  - Historical Chinese phonology
    - Old Chinese phonology
