= Xinjiang Mandarin =

Varieties of Mandarin Chinese

Xinjiang Mandarin (simplified Chinese: 新疆官话; traditional Chinese: 新疆官話; pinyin: Xinjiang Guānhuà) is an umbrella term to geographically group three different varieties of Mandarin Chinese spoken in Xinjiang. Lanyin Mandarin is spoken in northern Xinjiang. Central Plains Mandarin (中原官话) is spoken in southern Xinjiang.

Due to language contact between the Uyghurs and Han Chinese, Xinjiang Mandarin received some elements from the Uyghur language.
