= Hunanese people =

Han Chinese ethnic subgroup

湖南人
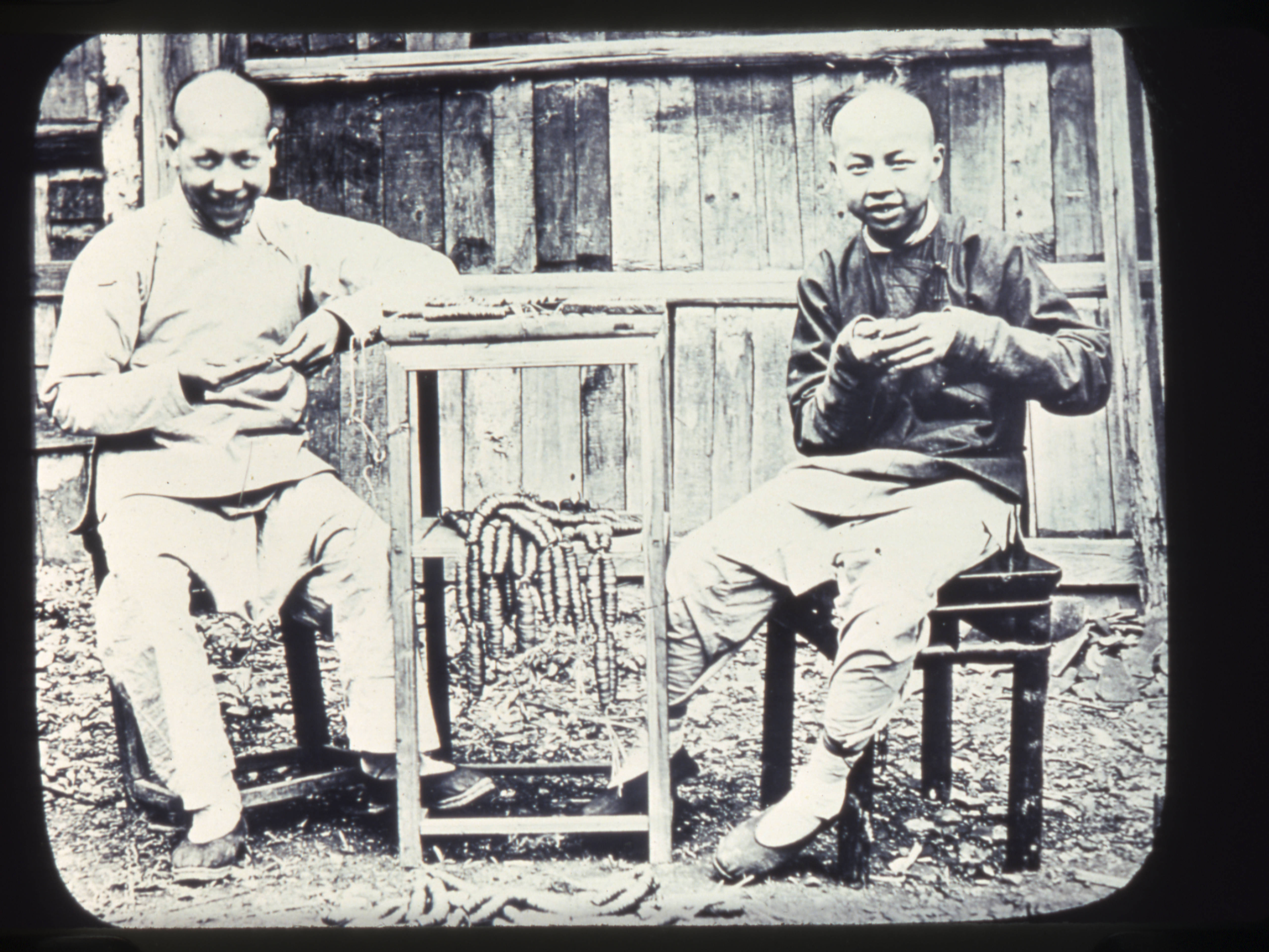
- Two Hunannese men counting brass coins in Changde, circa 1900-1919

Total population
- 38,149,000

Regions with significant populations
- People's Republic of China: Hunan, Guizhou, Guilin
- Taiwan: As a part of Waishengren population of Taiwan

Languages
- Xiang Chinese; Standard Chinese

Religion
- Mahayana Buddhism, Taoism, Confucianism, and Chinese folk religion

Related ethnic groups
- Han Chinese

The Hunanese people (Chinese: 湖南人; pinyin: Húnán rén; Xiang Chinese pronunciation: [/ɸu¹³ l̃an¹³ ʐən¹³/]), also known as Xiang people, are a Han Chinese ethnic subgroup originating from Hunan who speak Hunanese (Xiang Chinese). Some Hunanese communities are also found in the areas of Guilin, Guangxi and Guizhou.

== Culture ==
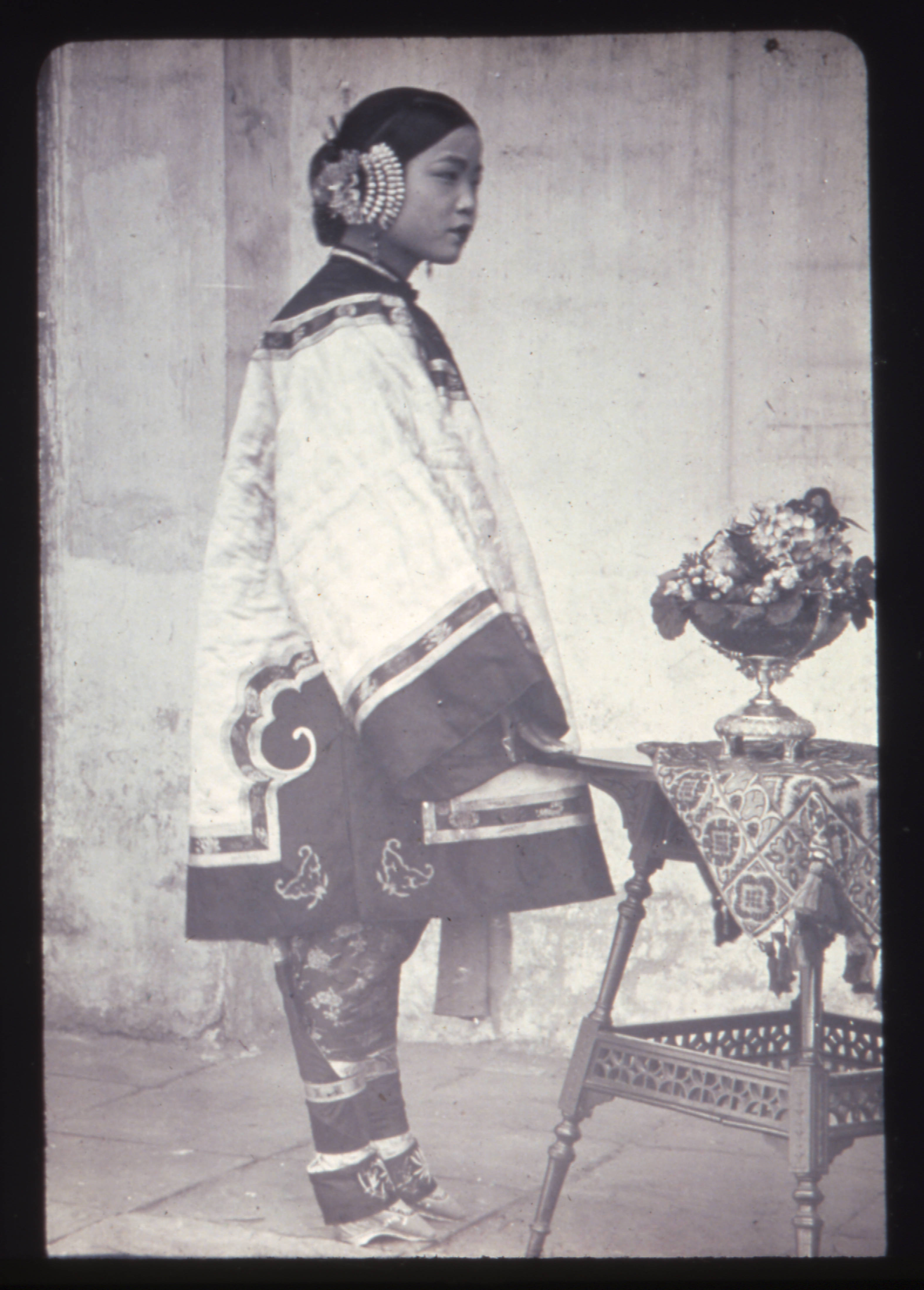
A dancing girl in her pre-Revolutionary costume in Changde, circa 1900-1919

=== Language ===
Xiang, or Hunanese, is a Sinitic language that originates from Hunan. According to Yang Xiong's Fangyan, people in what is the Xiang River region spoke the Southern Chu language, which is considered to be the ancestor of Xiang Chinese today.

=== Cuisine ===
Hunan cuisine uses chili peppers and has a history of cooking skills employed in it dating back to the 17th century.

Here’s a saying: “The food of the true revolutionary is the red pepper, and he who cannot endure red peppers is also unable to fight.”

=== Opera ===
Huaguxi is a local form of Chinese opera that is well-known in Hunan province.

== History ==
=== Ancient history ===
Prehistorically, the main inhabitants were the ancient country of Chu, Luo, tribes of Nanman, Baiyue and other tribes whose languages cannot be studied. During the Warring States period, large numbers of Chu migrated into Hunan. Their language blended with that of the original natives to produce a new dialect Southern Chu. During Qin and Han dynasty, most part of today's eastern Hunan belonged to the Changsha Kingdom. According to Yang Xiong's Fangyan, people in this region spoke Southern Chu, which is considered the ancestor of Xiang Chinese today.

=== 19th and 20th centuries ===
Hunanese people are associated with political leaders in 19th and 20th centuries China. The Xiang Army, commanded by Zeng Guofan, was instrumental in defeating the Taiping Rebellion. The Hunanese Huang Xing was the leader of the Wuchang Uprising and the first commander-in-chief of the Republic of China. In the 1920s, locals inspired by Wang Fuzhi, a seventeenth-century scholar who had advocated for "Western" ideas of progress, humanism, and provincialism, created the Hunanese self-government movement, which was championed by Peng Huang and the young Mao Zedong. Three of the "Big Five" original Politburo Standing Committee of the Chinese Communist Party members were from Hunan.

== Notable people ==
This is a list of people with either full or partial Hunanese ancestry.

- Cai Lun — paper innovator
- Liu Shaoqi — second President of the People's Republic of China
- Ma Ying-jeou — sixth President of the Republic of China
- Zhou Dunyi — philosopher
- Wang Fuzhi — philosopher
- Zeng Guofan — leader of the Xiang Army
- Zuo Zongtang
- Qi Baishi — regarded as one of the best Chinese painters in Chinese style
- Huang Xing — leader of the Wuchang Uprising and the first army commander-in-chief of the Republic of China
- Chen Tianhua — Han nationalist
- He Long
- Mao Zedong — founder and first Paramount leader of the People's Republic of China
- Peng Dehuai — considered one of the most successful and highly respected generals in the early Chinese Communist Party
- Hu Yaobang
- Zhu Rongji
- James Soong — founder and current chairman of the People First Party
- Peng Shuai
- Qiong Yao — regarded as the best romance novelist in the 20th century
- Liu Wen — model
- Song Jiaoren — anti-Qing Revolutionary
- Lung Ying-tai
- Loretta Yang
