= Yongzhou dialect =

Dialect of Xiang Chinese and Southern Min

- 永州话
- Native to: China
- Region: Yongzhou, Hunan province
- Language family: Sino-Tibetan: Sinitic; Xiang; Yong-Quan; Yongzhou dialect

Language codes
- ISO 639-3: –
- Glottolog: None

The Yongzhou dialect (Chinese: 永州话; pinyin: Yǒngzhōuhuà) is a dialect of Xiang Chinese spoken in Yongzhou, Hunan Province. It has been significantly influenced by Southwestern Mandarin historically.

== Origin and development ==
Before the Han dynasty, Yongzhou was entirely a residential area for ancient indigenous ethnic groups such as the Yao people. There are still many of their descendants in the upper reaches of Xiao River today.

During the Tang dynasty, the poet and official Liu Zongyuan was exiled to Yongzhou in 805. He encountered difficulties communicating with local residents because he could not understand their dialect. During his ten-year exile, Liu gradually became familiar with the local speech, eventually understanding it and learning to speak some of it.

Historical migration from Jiangxi contributed to the spread of Gan Chinese linguistic features across parts of Hunan, particularly during the Ming dynasty. However, the extent of this influence varied geographically. The Yongzhou region contains several Chinese dialect varieties, whose phonological and lexical characteristics have been examined in comparison with Standard Mandarin. Wang Runji and Wei Qijun (2024) classify the Yongzhou dialect within the Xiangnan subgroup of Southwestern Mandarin.

== See also ==
- Xiangnan Tuhua
- Qiyang dialect
