= Tone contour =

Phonetic feature of some languages

A tone contour or contour tone is a tone in a tonal language which shifts from one pitch to another over the course of the syllable or word. Tone contours are especially common in East Asia, Southeast Asia, West Africa, Nilo-Saharan languages, Khoisan languages, Oto-Manguean languages and some languages of South America.

== Contours ==
Chart invented by the Chinese linguist Yuen Ren Chao illustrating the contours of the four tones of Standard Chinese

When the pitch descends, the contour is called a falling tone; when it ascends, a rising tone; when it descends and then returns, a dipping or falling-rising tone; and when it ascends and then returns, it is called a peaking or rising-falling tone. A tone in a contour-tone language which remains at approximately an even pitch is called a level tone. Tones which are too short to exhibit much of a contour, typically because of a final plosive consonant, may be called checked, abrupt, clipped, or stopped tones.

It has been theorized that the relative timing of a contour tone is not distinctive. That is, in some accents or languages a falling tone might fall at the end and in others it might fall at the beginning, but that such differences would not be distinctive. However, in Dinka it is reported that the phonemic falling tone falls late (impressionistically high level + fall, [˥˦˩]) while the falling allophone of the low tone starts early (impressionistically fall + low level, [˥˨˩]).

Lexical tones more complex than dipping (falling–rising) or peaking (rising–falling) are quite rare, perhaps nonexistent, though prosody may produce such effects. The Old Xiang dialect of Qiyang is reported to have two "double contour" lexical tones, high and low fall–rise–fall, or perhaps high falling – low falling and low falling – high falling: ˦˨˧˨ and ˨˩˦˨ (4232 and 2142). The report did not determine if the final fall was lexical or merely the declination typically seen at the ends of prosodic units, so these may actually be dipping tones.

== Transcription ==
- Diacritics such as falling ⟨â⟩, rising ⟨ǎ⟩, dipping ⟨a᷉⟩, peaking ⟨a᷈⟩, high falling ⟨a᷇⟩, low falling ⟨a᷆⟩, high rising ⟨a᷄⟩ and low rising ⟨a᷅⟩. Or the simpler register tones, where diacritics such as high ⟨á⟩, mid ⟨ā⟩, and low ⟨à⟩ are usually sufficient for transcription. (These are also used for high, mid, and low level contour tones.)
- Tone letters such as mid level ⟨˧⟩, high falling ⟨˥˩⟩, low falling ⟨˨˩⟩, mid rising ⟨˧˥⟩, low rising ⟨˩˧⟩, dipping ⟨˨˩˦⟩, and peaking ⟨˧˦˩⟩.
- Numerical substitutions for tone letters. The seven tones above would be written ⟨33⟩, ⟨51⟩, ⟨21⟩, ⟨35⟩, ⟨13⟩, ⟨214⟩, ⟨341⟩, for an Asian language, or ⟨3⟩, ⟨15⟩, ⟨45⟩, ⟨31⟩, ⟨53⟩, ⟨452⟩, ⟨325⟩, for an African or American language. (The doubling of the numeral in ⟨33⟩ in the Asian example is used to disambiguate a mid level tone from a "tone 3" (3rd tone), which in general is not at pitch level 3.)
- Different spelling for the same vowel with different tones in systems like Latinxua Sin Wenz, Gwoyeu Romatzyh, Modern Literal Taiwanese etc. Compare Gwoyeu Romatzyh with Hanyu Pinyin (in parentheses): bai (bāi), bair (bái), bae (bǎi), bay (bài).

== See also ==
- Contour (linguistics)
- Tone letter
- Tone name
