= Yong–Quan Xiang =

Xiang Chinese variety in southern Hunan

- 永全片
- Native to: China
- Region: Hunan, Guangxi
- Speakers: 4.27 million (2012)
- Language family: Sino-Tibetan: Sinitic; Xiang; Yong–Quan Xiang
- Writing system: Chinese characters

Language codes
- ISO 639-3: None (mis)
- Glottolog: yong1285
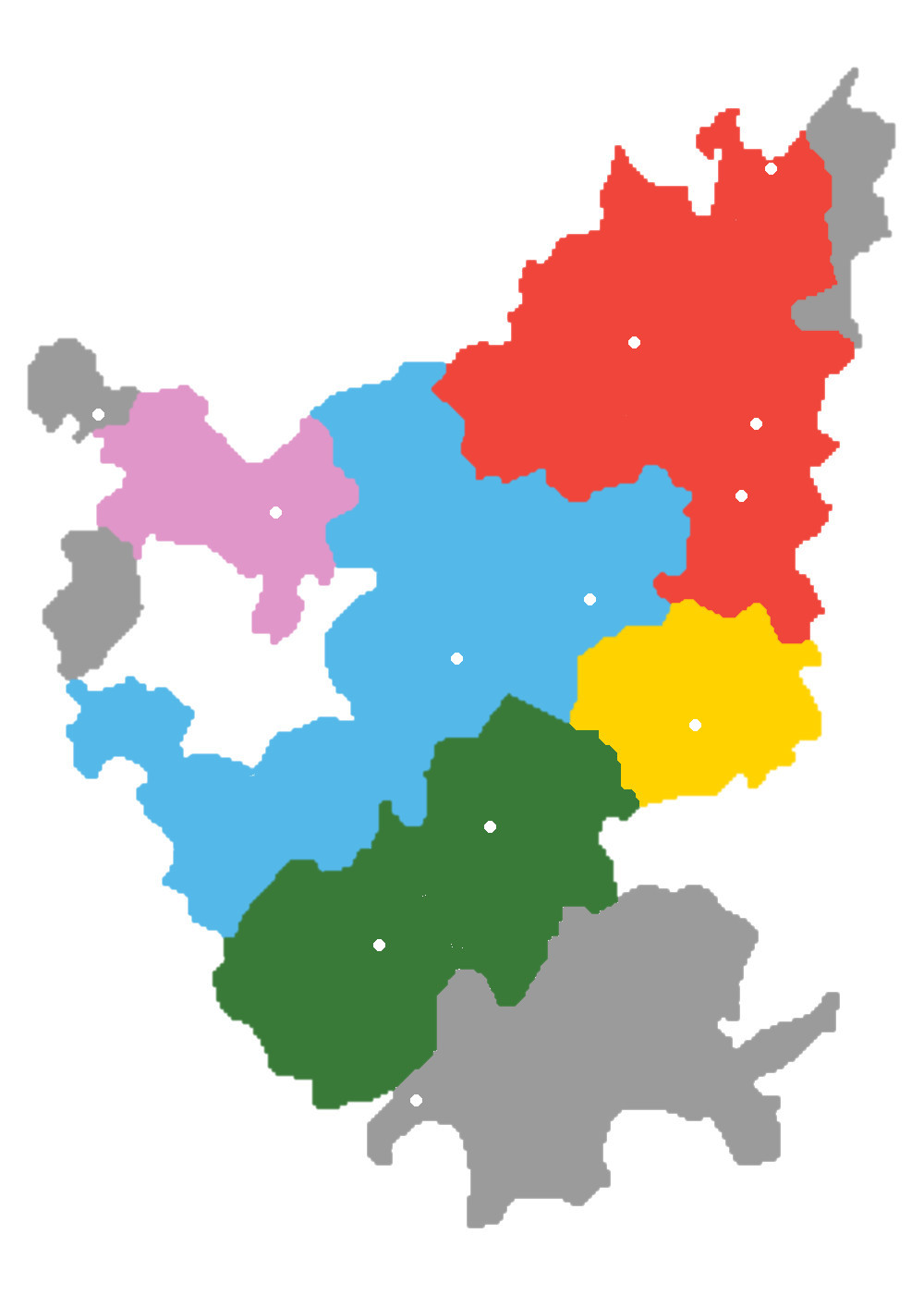
- Yong-Quan Xiang is in green. The white dots are Yongzhou and Quanzhou County.

Yong–Quan Xiang (Chinese: 永全片; pinyin: Yǒng-Quán piàn; lit. 'Yongzhou and Qiyang subgroup') is a Xiang Chinese language spoken in Guilin and southern Hunan that does not fit into the traditional New Xiang–Old Xiang dichotomy. It is geographically adjacent to the Old Xiang dialects that it was traditionally grouped with. The native-speaking population is mainly distributed in Yongzhou and surrounding areas.

The representative dialects are Yongzhou dialect and Qiyang dialect.

Yong-Quan Xiang retains a large number of Laminal consonants.
