= Ji–Xu Xiang =

Xiang Chinese language spoken in western Hunan

Ji-Xu Xiang
- 吉漵片 / 辰溆片
- Native to: People's Republic of China
- Region: Hunan
- Native speakers: (undated figure of 3.4 million)
- Language family: Sino-Tibetan: Sinitic; Xiang; Ji-Xu Xiang
- Writing system: Chinese characters

Language codes
- ISO 639-3: None (mis)
- ISO 639-6: jiix
- Glottolog: jish1242
- Linguasphere: 79-AAA-eac
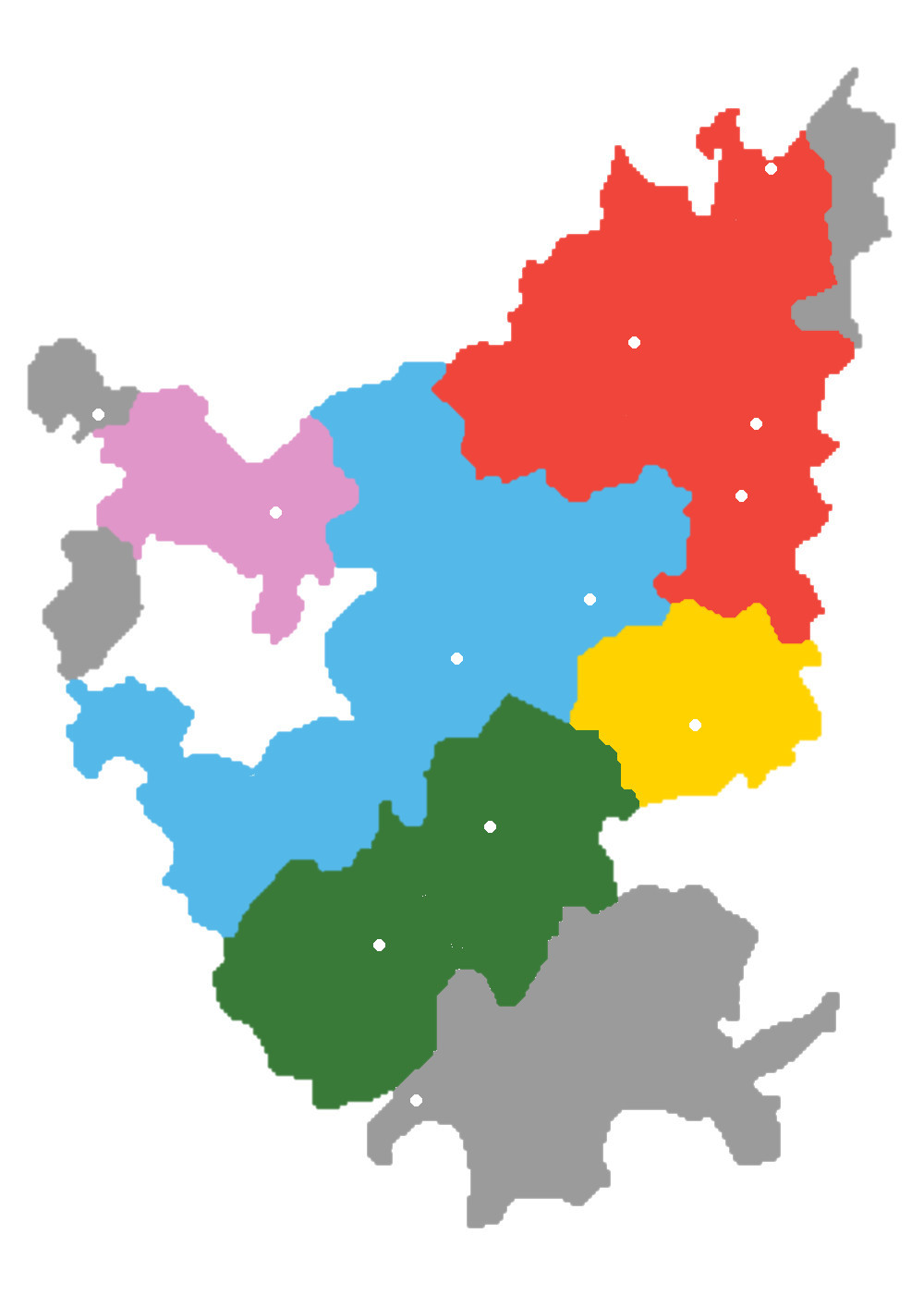
- Ji-Xu Xiang is in pink. Two grey regions in the west of the pink are sometimes considered Ji-Xu-speaking.

Ji–Xu Xiang (Chinese: 吉漵片; pinyin: Jí Xù piàn; lit. 'Jishou and Xupu subgroup'), also known as Chen–Xu (Chinese: 辰溆片; pinyin: Chén Xù piàn; lit. 'Chenxi and Xupu subgroup'), is a Xiang Chinese language spoken in western Hunan that does not fit into the traditional New Xiang–Old Xiang dichotomy. It is geographically separated from the New Xiang dialects that it was traditionally grouped with.

== Dialects ==
In the Language Atlas of China (1987), Xiang was divided into three subgroups. Their Ji-Xu subgroup comprised varieties spoken in the counties of Chenxi, Xupu, Luxi, Jishou, Baojing, Huayuan, Guzhang and Yuanling. Bao and Chen (2005) identified five subgroups of Xiang. Their Chen-Xu subgroup included varieties spoken in Chenxi, Xupu, Luxi, with the rest of the Atlas's Ji-Xu subgroup classified as Southwest Mandarin dialects.
