= Yunan dialect =

Goulou Yue Chinese dialect

Yunan
- Pronunciation: uɐk55 nam21 ua21
- Native to: China
- Region: Yunan County
- Language family: Sino-Tibetan: Sinitic; Chinese; Yue; Goulou; Yunan

Language codes
- ISO 639-3: –

The Yunan dialect (simplified Chinese: 郁南话; traditional Chinese: 郁南話; pinyin: Yùnánhuà, Yunan dialect IPA: uɐk55 nam21 ua21) is a dialect of Goulou Yue spoken in Yunan County, Yunfu, Guangdong.

== Phonology ==
The following table shows the pronunciation differences for selected Hanzi between Beijing Mandarin and the Yunan dialect.

Pronunciation of select Hanzi
Hanzi	Pinyin	Beijing Mandarin IPA	Yunan dialect IPA
是	shì	ʂʅ51	si21
人	rén	ʐən35	niɐn21
我	wǒ	uo214	ŋɔ13
有	yǒu	iou214	iɐu13
在	zài	tai51/tsai51	tʰɔi13
他	tā	tʰa55	tʰa55
中	zhōng	tʂuŋ55	tsuŋ55
个; 個	gè	kɤ51	kɔ42
