= Qiyang dialect =

Dialect of Xiang Chinese

- 祁阳话
- Native to: China
- Region: Qiyang, Hunan province
- Language family: Sino-Tibetan: Sinitic; Xiang; Yong–Quan; Qiyang dialect
- Writing system: Chinese characters

Language codes
- ISO 639-3: –
- Glottolog: None

The Qiyang dialect (Chinese: 祁阳话; pinyin: Qíyánghuà) is a dialect of Xiang Chinese spoken in Qiyang, Hunan province.

== Tones ==
The Qiyang dialect is quite unusual in that it is reported to have two "double contour" tones, high and low fall–rise–fall, or perhaps high fall – low fall and low fall – high fall: the entering tones yin qu (阴去) ˦˨˧˨ (4232) and yang qu (阳去) ˨˩˦˨ (2142). However, phonetically the pitch of a syllable depends on the voicing of the initial consonant, so these are phonemically a single tone. Moreover, the final fall of the yin qu tone is "not perceptually relevant", so it may be that 'dipping' (for yin qu) and 'peaking' (for yang qu) are a sufficient categorization.

== See also ==
- Yongzhou dialect
