= Yangyu dialect =

Mandarin dialect of Fujian

Yangyu
- 洋屿话, 洋嶼話
- Native to: China
- Region: Yangyu and Qinjiang, Changle, Fujian
- Language family: Sino-Tibetan: Sinitic; Chinese; Mandarin; Yangyu

Language codes
- ISO 639-3: –

Yangyu dialect (simplified Chinese: 洋屿话; traditional Chinese: 洋嶼話; pinyin: Yángyǔhuà),, also known as Qinjiang dialect (simplified Chinese: 琴江话; traditional Chinese: 琴江話; pinyin: Qínjiānghuà), is a Mandarin "dialect island", spoken in the villages of Yangyu and Qinjiang, located in Changle, Fujian. It is considered to be derived from the Beijing Mandarin spoken by the local descendants of Han Chinese Bannermen serving the Qing Empire. It received some influence from the neighboring Eastern Min varieties of Changle, for example in its phonology.

== History ==
In 1729, during the seventh year of the reign of Yongzheng, the Qing government built a castle in the Yangyu area of Changle County in response to frequent uprisings along the Fujian coast. This was situated at the confluence of three key tributaries of the Min River (闽江; 閩江; Mǐn Jiāng), namely the Wulong River, Majiang River and Qinjiang River. The Bannermen and their families that were stationed there came mostly from the area near Beijing and established the Qinjiang Village (commonly known as 旗下里; Qíxià Lǐ) there. Due to the unique status of these military families, as well as the ethnic and class tensions, they had limited interaction with the local population and did not intermarry, thus retaining the Mandarin dialect that they had spoken.
