= Gao–Yang Yue =

Branch of Yue varieties

- 高陽方言/高語
- Native to: Southern China
- Speakers: 6.43 million (2012)
- Language family: Sino-Tibetan: Sinitic; Chinese; Yue; Gao–Yang Yue

Language codes
- ISO 639-3: None (mis)
- ISO 639-6: goya
- Glottolog: gaol1235
- Linguasphere: 79-AAA-mc
- Gao-Yang (lower centre), among other Yue and Pinghua groups in Guangxi and Guangdong

Gao–Yang, or Gao–Lei or Gao–Yu, is one of four principal Yue Chinese languages. It is spoken in around Maoming and Yangjiang in southwestern Guangdong.

The name derives from its two dialects, Gaozhou and Yangjiang.
