= Goulou Yue =

Yue dialect of China

Goulou
- 勾漏方言 Ngaulau Yut
- Native to: Southern China
- Region: Guangxi–Guangdong border
- Speakers: 10.3 million (2012)
- Language family: Sino-Tibetan: Sinitic; Chinese; Yue; Goulou

Language codes
- ISO 639-3: None (mis)
- ISO 639-6: gulu
- Glottolog: None guin1237 Goulou
- Linguasphere: 79-AAA-me
- Goulou, among other Yue and Pinghua groups in Guangxi and Guangdong

Goulou is one of the principal groups of Yue dialects. It is spoken around the Guangxi–Guangdong border, and includes the dialects of Yulin and Bobai.

== Dialects ==
Yulin dialect is representative, though Bobai is better known.

- Yulin dialect
  - Bobai dialect
- Guangning dialect
- Huaiji dialect
- Fengkai dialect
- Deqing dialect
- Yunan dialect
- Shanglin dialect
- Binyang dialect
- Tengxian dialect

== Phonology ==
=== Initials ===
Consonants of the Tengxian dialect
		Labial	Alveolar	Palatal	Velar	Glottal
Stop/ Affricate	voiceless	p	t	tʃ	k	(ʔ)
Stop/ Affricate	aspirated	pʰ	tʰ	tʃʰ	kʰ	
Stop/ Affricate	implosive	ɓ	ɗ			
Nasal		m	n	ɲ	ŋ	
Fricative	voiceless	f		ʃ		h
Fricative	voiced	v				
Fricative	lateral		ɬ			
Approximant	voiced		l	j		
Approximant	labial			ɥ	w	

=== Finals ===
Vowel nuclei
	Front		Central	Back
	unrounded	rounded	Central	Back
Close	i	y		u
Close-mid	e	ø		o
Open-mid	ɛ	œ		ɔ
Near-open			ɐ	
Open			a	

- Close vowel sounds may alternate between close vowel sounds [i, y, u] and near-close vowel sounds [ɪ, ʏ, ʊ].

Vowel combinations
			Oral			Nasal			Stop		
Medial		coda	i	y	u	m	n	ŋ	p	t	k
Nucleus	Vowel	a	ai		au	am	an	aŋ	ap	at	ak
Nucleus	Vowel	wa	wai				wan			wat	
Nucleus	Vowel		ɐi		ɐu	ɐm	ɐn	ɐŋ	ɐp	ɐt	ɐk
Nucleus	Vowel		wɐi				wɐn			wɐt	
Nucleus	Vowel	i(ɛ)			iɛu	iɛm		iɛŋ	iɛp		iɛk
Nucleus	Vowel		(ei)					eŋ			ek
Nucleus	Vowel										wek
Nucleus	Vowel	i			iu	im	in		ip	it	
Nucleus	Vowel	œ									
Nucleus	Vowel			øy							
Nucleus	Vowel	y									
Nucleus	Vowel	ɔ	ɔi			ɔm	ɔn	ɔŋ	ɔp	ɔt	ɔk
Nucleus	Vowel				ou			oŋ			ok
Nucleus	Vowel	u	ui				un			ut	

=== Tone ===
Bobai dialect is widely cited as having the most tones of any variety of Chinese, though it actually only has six, the same as most Yue dialects. The reason for the claim is that Bobai makes a four-way tonal distinction in checked syllables, whereas most other Yue dialects have three. In Yulin dialect just to the north of Bobai, however, neither entering tone is split: there are just two entering tones, 7 and 8. Lee (1993) believes that Bobai is innovative in having split 8, whereas Yulin (along with several neighboring interior Yue dialects) is innovative in having merged a former split in 7: proto-Yue probably had 7a, 7b, and 8.

Many Yue varieties exhibit a "changed tone" with some semantic content. Such tones occur in the Yulin dialect, in checked syllables only, marking diminutives. In such cases, the final stop -p, -t or -k is changed to a homorganic nasal -m, -n or -ŋ, respectively, and the pitch contour is also altered. This seems to be a trace of a now-lost suffix similar to ér (兒, Middle Chinese nye) in other Chinese varieties.
