= Lanyin Mandarin =

Branch of Mandarin Chinese in northwest China

Lan–Yin Mandarin
- 蘭銀官話 兰银官话 لًاءٍ قُوًاخُوَا
- Region: Gansu, northern Ningxia, part of northern Xinjiang
- Language family: Sino-Tibetan: Sinitic; Chinese; Mandarin; Lan–Yin Mandarin
- Writing system: Chinese characters Xiao'erjing

Language codes
- ISO 639-3: –
- ISO 639-6: lyiu
- Glottolog: xibe1241
- Linguasphere: 79-AAA-bg
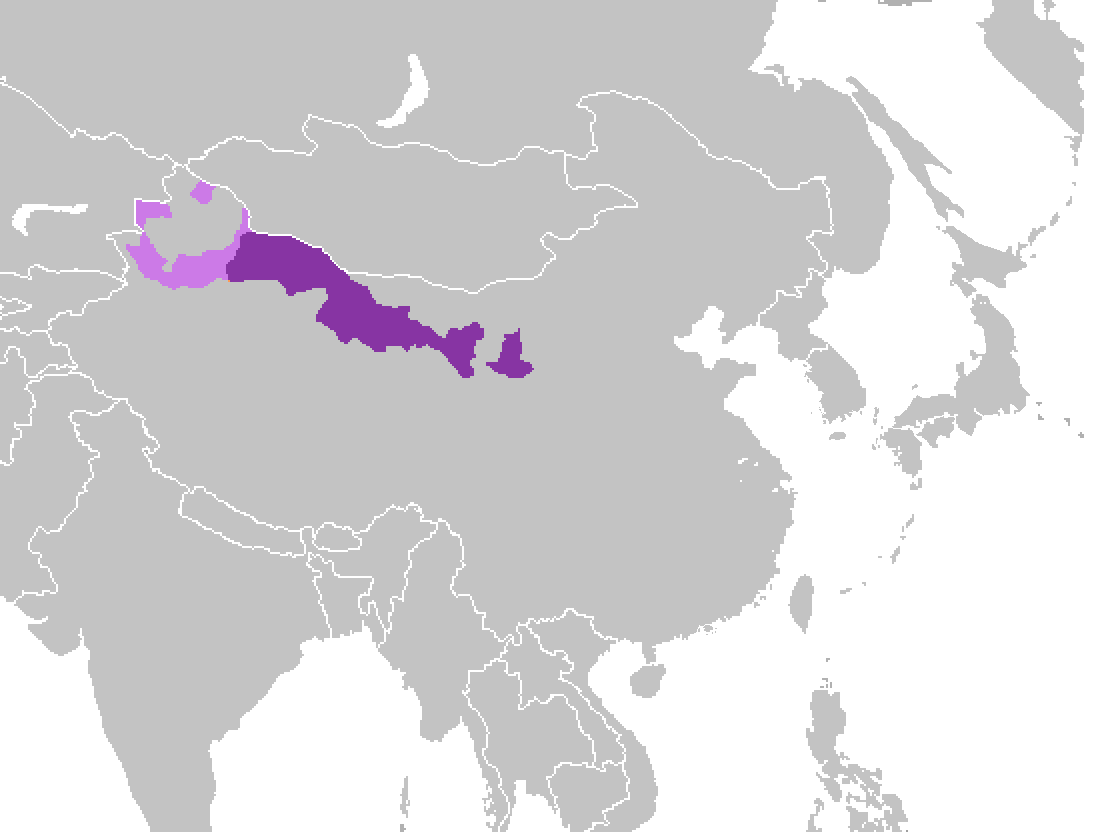

Lan–Yin Mandarin (Lanyin) (simplified Chinese: 兰银官话; traditional Chinese: 蘭銀官話; pinyin: Lán–Yín Guānhuà) is a branch of Mandarin Chinese traditionally spoken throughout Gansu province and in the northern part of Ningxia. In recent decades it has expanded into northern Xinjiang. It has also been grouped together with Central Plains Mandarin (Chinese: 中原官话). The name is a compound of the capitals of the two former provinces where it dominates, Lanzhou and Yinchuan, which are also two of its principal subdialects.

Among Chinese Muslims, it was sometimes written in the Arabic alphabet instead of Chinese characters.

The 14th Dalai Lama, Tenzin Gyatso, speaks the Xining dialect as his first language: he has said that his first language was "a broken Xining language which was (a dialect of) the Chinese language", a form of Central Plains Mandarin, and his family speak neither Amdo Tibetan nor Lhasa Tibetan.

== Major Subdialects ==
- Lanzhou dialect (simplified Chinese: 兰州话; traditional Chinese: 蘭州話)
- Urumqi dialect (simplified Chinese: 乌鲁木齐话; traditional Chinese: 烏魯木齊話)
- Yinchuan dialect (simplified Chinese: 银川话; traditional Chinese: 銀川話)
