= Fangyan (book) =

Han dynasty dictionary of regional terms

- Chinese: 方言
- Literal meaning: Regional speech
Transcriptions
Standard Mandarin
- Hanyu Pinyin: Fāngyán
- Gwoyeu Romatzyh: Fangyan
- Wade–Giles: Fang^{1}-yen^{2}
- IPA: [fáŋ.jɛ̌n]
Yue: Cantonese
- Yale Romanization: Fōng-yìhn
- Jyutping: Fong1-jin4
Southern Min
- Tâi-lô: Hong-giân
Old Chinese
- Baxter–Sagart (2014): *paŋ ŋa[r]

The Fangyan (Note: The full title is 輶軒使者絕代語釋別國方言 ('Local expressions of other countries in times immemorial explained by the Light-Carriage Messenger').) is a Chinese dictionary compiled in the early 1st century CE by the poet and philosopher Yang Xiong (53 BCE – 18 CE). (Note: Translations include 'regional words', 'regional expressions', 'dictionary of local expressions', and 'regional spoken words'. In modern usage, the term fangyan is customarily translated as English dialect, but linguists have proposed direct neologisms of regionalect (John DeFrancis) and topolect (Victor H. Mair).) It was the first Chinese dictionary to include significant regional vocabulary, and is considered the "most significant lexicographic work" of its era. His dictionary's preface explains how he spent 27 years amassing and collating the dictionary. Yang collected regionalisms from many sources, particularly the 'light carriage' (輶軒 yóuxuān) surveys made during the Zhou and Qin dynasties, where imperial emissaries were sent into the countryside annually to record folk songs and idioms from across China, reaching as far north as Korea.

== Contents ==
Major Han-era dialect groups as inferred from the Fangyan

The Fangyan covers a vast geographical range: from Dongqi and Haidai in the east, to Qin, Long, and Liangzhou in the west; from Yan and Zhao in the north, to Jiuyi and Guilin in the south; northeast to Korea and the Lie River; northwest to the northern frontiers of Qin and Jin; southeast to Wu, Yue, and Dong’ou; and southwest to Liangyi and Shuhan—virtually encompassing the entire territory of the Han dynasty. Its content is remarkably rich, and may be broadly grouped into the following categories: (1) Tongyu (common language) — also called fanyu, fantongyu, or tongming. This refers to a common language with no regional restrictions, widely used across the Western Han. For example: “Jia, shi, cu, and shi all mean ‘to go.’ To leave one’s home is called jia; a woman leaving home for marriage is also called jia. Shi is the Qin-Jin term; cu is the Qi term; shi is the Song-Lu term; wang is the common term.” (2) Common language between certain regions — also called “the common speech of the four quarters” or “differing regional speeches that are mutually intelligible.” These are dialects with a relatively wide area of usage. For example: “The head-covering is called zejin, or chenglu, or fu…: these are all common terms between Zhao and Wei.” (3) Ancient and modern terms — also called “elegant ancient dialects” or simply guya, referring to ancient dialectal forms that survived in actual usage. For example: “Dun, feng, mang, …, wu, ban, gu, yi, rong, jing, zang, and jiang all mean ‘big.’ The general appearance of bigness is called feng; mang means ‘deeply great.’ Between Dongqi and Haidai it is called …, or wu; between Song, Lu, Chen, and Wei it is called gu, or rong; between Qin and Jin, anything large and strong is called gu, or xia; between Qin and Jin, a person of great size is called zang, or zhuang; in the northern frontier of Yan and the outskirts of Qi and Chu, it is called jing, or jiang. These are all ancient and modern terms—originally the speech of separate states that did not communicate with one another, but now sometimes identical. Since the old books and elegant records preserve these old colloquialisms without losing their regional character, and later people no longer understood them, explanations were provided for them.” (4) The speech of a place / of places — these are dialects of different regions. “Diel and feng both mean ‘site/ground.’ South of Ying in Chu, an ant’s mound is called diel; diel is the Central Qi term.” (5) Zhuanyu (variant words) — Words arising from phonological differences among dialects are called zhuanyu by Yang Xiong, and the cause is termed “the shifting of speech.” Though written differently, zhuanyu are often phonetically similar. For example: “Yong is called song—this is a zhuanyu.”

== Terminology ==
Victor Mair proposed that 方言 be translated as topolect, while dialect should be translated into Chinese as 通言 tōngyán. Based on this, topolect has been used to characterize other speech varieties where an identification as either language or dialect would be controversial. Examples include Scots and the various regional varieties of Arabic and Romani. In all of these situations, an identification of distinct languages by the straightforward criterion of mutual intelligibility may not be politically or socially acceptable to a significant number of scholars. For example, several varieties of Southwestern Mandarin are not mutually intelligible, and they would be classified as distinct languages within the Mandarin branch of the Sinitic language family, if it weren't for the dominant social, historical, and political concept of Chinese as a unitary language. Mandarin, Southwestern Mandarin, the mutually unintelligible varieties of Southwestern Mandarin, and indeed the mutually intelligible dialects within those varieties are all termed "topolects".

== See also ==
- Shuowen Jiezi
- List of Chinese dictionaries
- Great Dictionary of Modern Chinese Dialects
