= Yuan Jiahua =

Chinese linguist

Yuan Jiahua (simplified Chinese: 袁家骅; traditional Chinese: 袁家驊; pinyin: Yuán Jiāhuá, [ɥɛ̌n tɕjáxwǎ]; January 1903 – 4 September 1980) was a Chinese linguist and dialectologist from Zhangjiagang, Jiangsu province. He graduated from the English Department of Peking University in 1932, worked as an editor in the North Shanghai New Books Office and as a teaching assistant at Peking University. In 1937, he went to Oxford University to major in Old English and Germanic languages. After returning to China, he held professorships in Kunming and Beijing. He has made significant contributions to the field of linguistics primarily in researching the languages of China's ethnic minorities and Chinese dialects.
