= Xiang Chinese =

Primary branch of Chinese spoken in southern China

Xiang
- 湘語/湘语
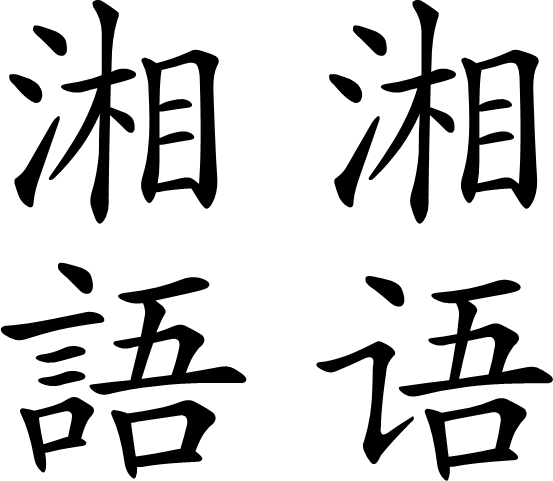
- "Xiang language" written in Chinese characters
- Pronunciation: Xiang Chinese pronunciation: [sian˧ y˦˩]
- Native to: China
- Region: Central and southwestern Hunan, northern Guangxi, parts of Guizhou, Guangdong, Sichuan, Jiangxi and Hubei provinces
- Ethnicity: Hunanese
- Native speakers: 38 million (2021)
- Language family: Sino-Tibetan: Sinitic; Chinese; Xiang
- Varieties: Old Xiang (Lou–Shao); New Xiang (Chang–Yi); Chen–Xu Xiang (Ji–Xu); Hengzhou Xiang; Yong–Quan Xiang
- Writing system: Chinese characters

Language codes
- ISO 639-3: hsn
- Glottolog: xian1251
- Linguasphere: 79-AAA-e
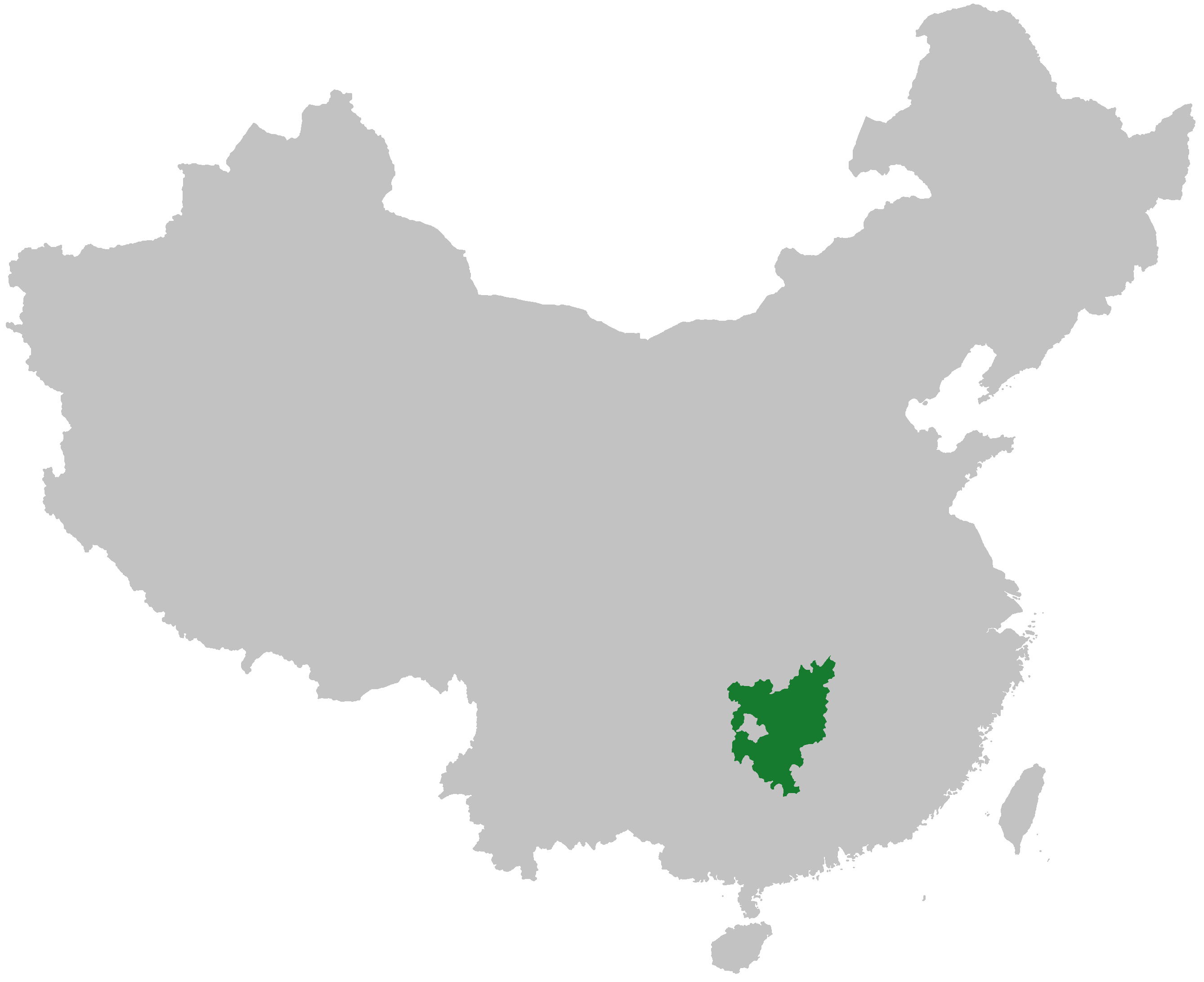

Xiang Chinese
- Traditional Chinese: 湘語
- Simplified Chinese: 湘语
Transcriptions
Standard Mandarin
- Hanyu Pinyin: Xiāng Yǔ
Xiang
- IPA: [sian˧ y˦˩]
Yue: Cantonese
- Yale Romanization: Sēungyúh

Hunan language
- Traditional Chinese: 湖南話
- Simplified Chinese: 湖南话
Transcriptions
Standard Mandarin
- Hanyu Pinyin: Húnán Huà
Xiang
- IPA: ɣu^{13}nia^{13}ɣo^{21}
Yue: Cantonese
- Yale Romanization: Wùhnàahm wá

Xiang or Hsiang (Chinese: 湘; Changsha Xiang: [sian˧ y˦˩], Mandarin: [ɕi̯aŋ˥ y˨˩˦]) is a group of linguistically similar and historically related Sinitic languages, spoken mainly in Hunan province but also in northern Guangxi and parts of neighboring Guizhou, Guangdong, Sichuan, Jiangxi and Hubei provinces. Scholars divided Xiang into five subgroups: Lou–Shao (Old Xiang), Chang–Yi (New Xiang), Chen–Xu or Ji–Xu, Hengzhou, and Yong–Quan. Among those, Lou–Shao, or Old Xiang, still exhibits the three-way distinction of Middle Chinese obstruents, preserving the voiced stops, fricatives, and affricates. Xiang has also been heavily influenced by Mandarin, which adjoins three of the four sides of the Xiang-speaking territory, and Gan in Jiangxi Province, from where a large population immigrated to Hunan during the Ming dynasty.

Xiang-speaking Hunanese people have played an important role in Modern Chinese history, especially in those reformatory and revolutionary movements such as the Self-Strengthening Movement, Hundred Days' Reform, Xinhai Revolution and Chinese Communist Revolution. Some examples of Xiang speakers are Mao Zedong, Zuo Zongtang, Huang Xing and Ma Ying-jeou.

Historical linguists such as W. South Coblin have been in doubt of a taxonomic grouping of Xiang. However, counterargument suggests that shared innovations can be identified for Xiang.

== History ==
=== Prehistory ===
Prehistorically, the main inhabitants were the ancient country of Ba, Nanman, Baiyue and other tribes whose languages cannot be studied. During the Warring States period, large numbers of Chu migrated into Hunan. Their language blended with that of the original natives to produce a new dialect, Nanchu (Southern Chu). During Qin and Han dynasty, most part of today's Eastern Hunan belonged to Changsha Kingdom. According to Yang Xiong's Fangyan, people in this region spoke Southern Chu, which is considered the ancestor of Xiang Chinese today.

=== Middle ages and recent history ===
During the Tang dynasty, a large-scale emigration took place with people emigrating from the north to the south, bringing Middle Chinese into Hunan. Today's Xiang still keeps some Middle Chinese words, such as 嬉 (to have fun), 薅 (to weed), 行 (to walk). Entering tone vowels started weakening in Hunan at this time. Migrants who came from the North mainly settled in northern Hunan, followed by western Hunan. For this reason, northern and western Hunan are Mandarin districts.

Migrants from Jiangxi concentrated mainly in southeastern Hunan and present day Shaoyang and Xinhua districts. They came for two reasons: The first is that Jiangxi became too crowded, and its people sought expansion. The second is that Hunan suffered greatly during the Mongol conquest of the Song dynasty, when there was mass slaughter. The late Yuan dynasty peasant uprising caused a great many casualties in Hunan.

During the Ming dynasty, a large-scale emigration from Jiangxi to Hunan took place. In the early Ming dynasty, large numbers of migrants came from Jiangxi and settled in present day Yueyang, Changsha, Zhuzhou, Xiangtan, and Hengyang districts. After the middle of the Ming dynasty, migrants came more diverse, and came more for economic reasons and commerce. Gan, which was brought by settlers from Jiangxi, influenced Xiang. The speech in east Hunan differentiated into New Xiang during that period.

Quanzhou County became part of Guangxi province after the adjustment of administrative divisions in the Ming dynasty. Some features of Xiang at that time were kept in this region.

== Languages and dialects ==
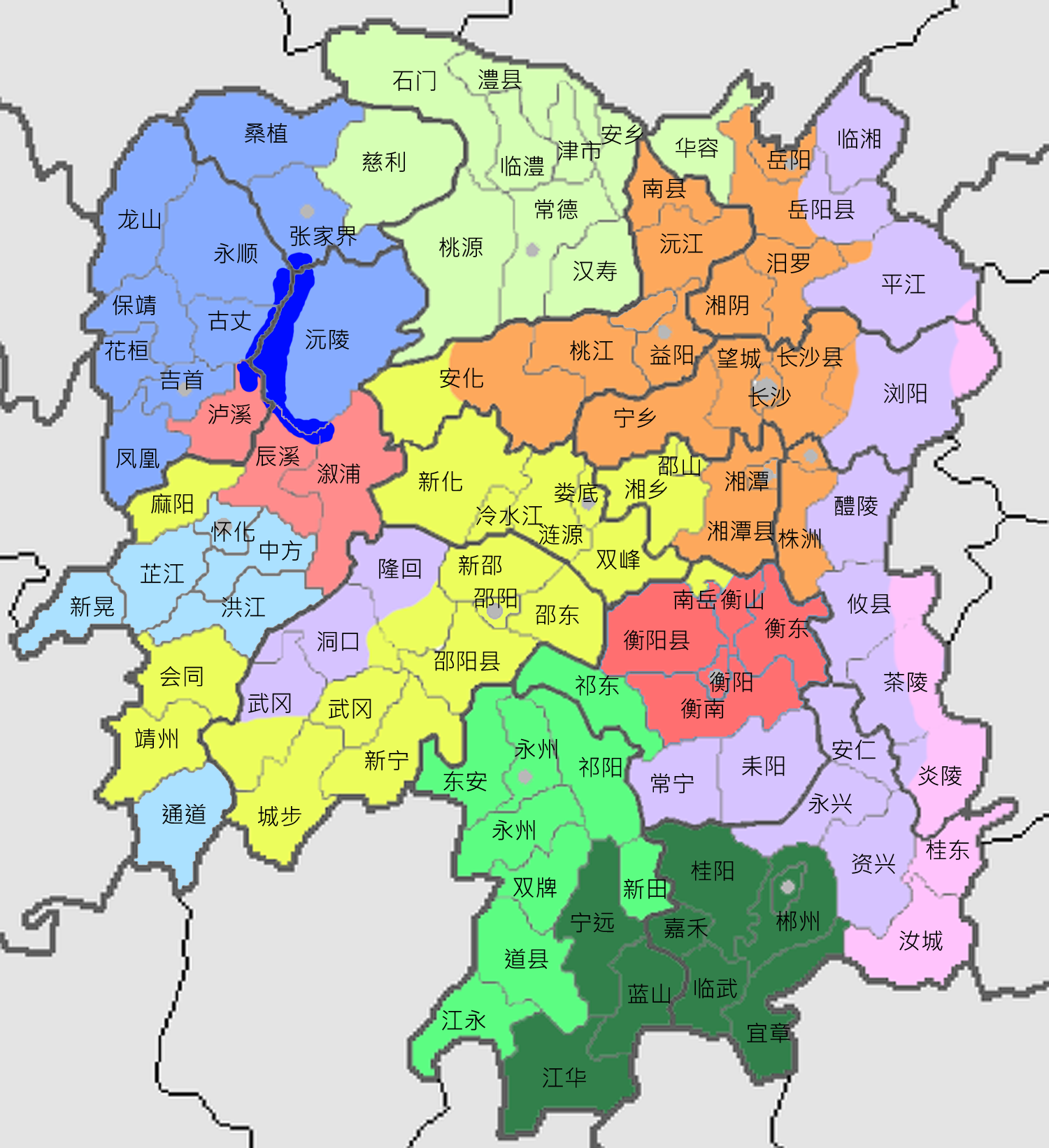
Dialect map of Hunan Province. New Xiang, Old Xiang, Chen-Xu Xiang, Hengzhou Xiang. Xiangnan Tuhua, Xiangnan Tuhua and Southwestern Mandarin coextensive. Note other dialects are shown in larger areas than in the next map. Gan, Hakka, Southwestern Mandarin, and Waxiang.

Since the classification of Yuan Jiahua (1960), Xiang has been considered one of seven major groups of varieties of Chinese. Jerry Norman classified Xiang, Gan and Wu as central groups, intermediate between the Mandarin group to the north and the southern groups, Min, Hakka and Yue.

In Xiang languages, the voiced initials of Middle Chinese yield unaspirated initials in all tone categories. A few varieties have retained voicing in all tones, but most have voiceless initials in some or all tone categories.

Development of voiced initials in different tones
gloss	Middle Chinese	Chengbu	Shuangfeng	Shaoyang	Changsha
peach	桃 daw	dao^{2}	də^{2}	daɤ^{2}	taɤ^{2}
sit	坐 dzwaX	dzo^{6}	dzu^{6}	tso^{6}	tso^{6}
together	共 gjowngH	goŋ^{6}	gaŋ^{6}	koŋ^{6}	koŋ^{5}
white	白 baek	ba^{7}	piɛ^{6}	pe^{6}	pɤ^{7}

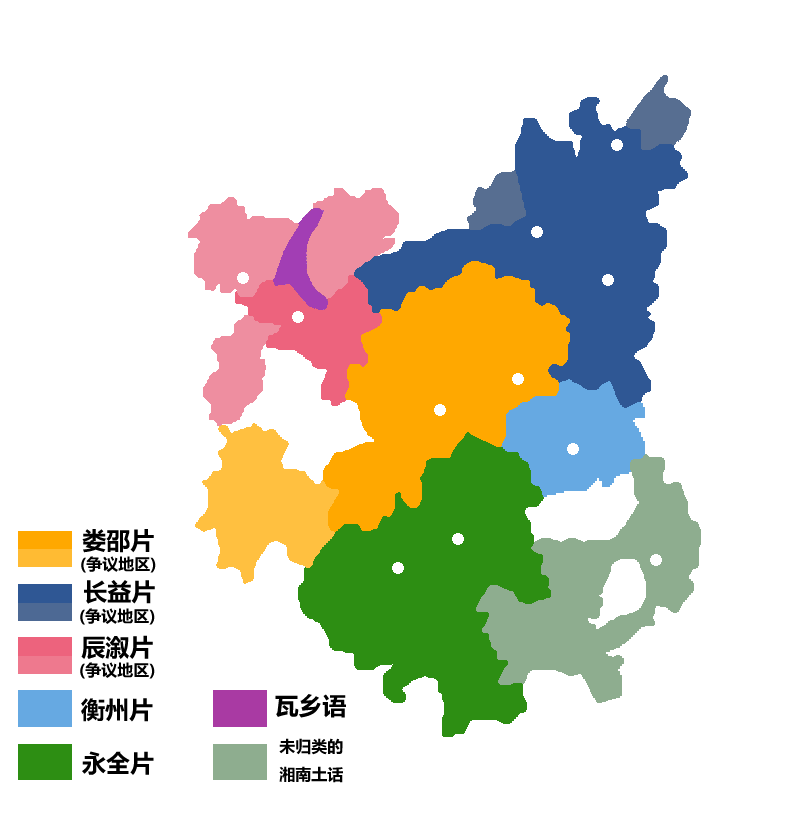

Xiang and other subgroups identified by Bao & Chen

New Xiang (Chang–Yi)	Waxiang
Hengzhou	Xiangnan Tuhua
Chen–Xu (Ji–Xu)
Old Xiang (Lou–Shao)
Yong-Quan

Pervasive influence from Mandarin dialects has made Xiang dialects difficult to classify. Yuan Jiahua divided Xiang into New Xiang, in which voicing has been lost completely, and Old Xiang varieties, which retain voiced initials in at least some tones. The Changsha dialect is usually taken as representative of New Xiang, while Shuangfeng dialect represents Old Xiang. Norman describes the boundary between New Xiang and Southwestern Mandarin as one of the weakest in China, with considerable similarities between dialects near either side of the boundary, though more distant dialects are mutually unintelligible. Indeed, Zhou Zhenhe and You Rujie (unlike most authors) classified New Xiang as part of Southwestern Mandarin.

The Language Atlas of China relabelled the New and Old Xiang groups as Chang-Yi and Lou-Shao respectively, and identified a third subgroup, Ji-Xu, in some parts of Western Hunan. Bao & Chen (2005) split out part of Atlas's Chang-Yi subgroup as a new Hengzhou subgroup, and part of Lou-Shao as a Yong-Quan subgroup. They also reclassified parts of the Ji–Xu subgroup as Southwestern Mandarin, renaming the remainder of the subgroup as Chen-Xu Xiang. Their five subgroups are:

Chang-Yi
(17.8 million speakers) voiced initials in Middle Chinese become unaspirated voiceless consonant. Most of the dialects retain the entering tone as a separate category.
Lou-Shao
(11.5 million speakers) Voiced initials still exist. The entering tone does not exist in most of the dialects.
Chen-Xu Xiang
(3.4 million speakers) Some of the voiced consonants are retained.
Hengzhou Xiang
(4.3 million speakers)
Yong-Quan Xiang
(6.5 million speakers) Voiced consonants still exist.

== Geographic distribution ==
Xiang is spoken by over 36 million people in China, primarily in the most part of the Hunan province, and in the five counties of Quanzhou, Guanyang, Ziyuan, Xing'an and Longsheng in northeastern Guangxi province, and in several places of Guizhou and Sichuan provinces. It is abutted by Southwestern Mandarin-speaking areas to the north and west, as well as by Gan in the eastern parts of Hunan and Jiangxi. Xiang is also in contact with the Qo-Xiong Miao and Tujia languages in West Hunan.

Distribution of Xiang subgroups according to Bao & Chen (2005)
Subgroup	Division	Main cities and counties
New Xiang	Chang-Tan	Urban Changsha, Changsha County, Wangcheng District, Ningxiang, Liuyang*, Urban Zhuzhou, Zhuzhou County, Urban Xiangtan, Xiangyin, Miluo, Nanxian, Anxiang*
New Xiang	Yi-Yuan	Urban Yiyang, Yuanjiang, Taojiang, Anhua, Nanxian*
New Xiang	Yueyang	Yueyang County, Urban Yueyang
Old Xiang	Xiang-Shuang	Xiangtan County, Shuangfeng, Shaoshan, Urban Loudi, Hengshan*
Old Xiang	Lian-Mei	Lianyuan, Lengshuijiang*, Anhua*, Ningxiang*
Old Xiang	Xinhua	Xinhua, Lengshuijiang
Old Xiang	Shao-Wu	Urban Shaoyang, Wugang, Shaodong, Shaoyang County, Xinshao, Longhui, Xinning, Chengbu, Dongkou*
Old Xiang	Sui-Hui	Suining, Huitong
Hengzhou	Hengyang	Urban Hengyang, Hengyang County, Hengnan
Hengzhou	Hengshan	Hengshan, Hengdong, Nanyue
Chen-Xu	–	Chenxi, Xupu, Luxi, Jishou**, Baojing**, Huayuan**, Guzhang**, Yuanling*
Yong-Quan	Dong-Qi	Urban Yongzhou, Dong'an, Qiyang, Qidong
Yong-Quan	Dao-Jiang	Jiangyong, Daoxian, Jianghua*, Xintian*
Yong-Quan	Quan-Zi	Quanzhou County, Xing'an, Guanyang, Ziyuan, Longsheng
*Small part of this territory belongs to this Xiang subgroup. **Included in Xiang only in Language Atlas of China.

== Bibliography ==
- Bào, Hòuxīng 鮑厚星; Chén, Huī 陳暉 (2005). "Xiāngyǔ de fēnqū" 湘語的分區 [The divisions of Xiang languages]. Fāngyán: 261–270.
- Jiang, Junfeng (June 2006). Xiāngxiāng fāngyán yǔyīn yánjiū 湘乡方言语音研究 [A Phonological Study of Xiangxiang Dialect] (PhD thesis). Hunan Normal University. Archived from the original on 15 December 2018.
- Kurpaska, Maria (2010). Chinese Language(s): A Look Through the Prism of "The Great Dictionary of Modern Chinese Dialects". Walter de Gruyter. ISBN 978-3-11-021914-2.
- Norman, Jerry (1988). Chinese. Cambridge, England: Cambridge University Press. ISBN 0-521-29653-6.
- Wu, Yunji (2005). A synchronic and diachronic study of the grammar of the Chinese Xiang dialects. Trends in linguistics. Vol. 162. Berlin, New York: Walter de Gruyter. ISBN 3-11-018366-8.
- Yan, Margaret Mian (2006). Introduction to Chinese Dialectology. LINCOM Europa. ISBN 978-3-89586-629-6.
- Yang, Shifeng (楊時逢) (1974). 湖南方言調查報告 (1-2). 中央研究院歷史語言研究所專刊[第66卷]. Taipei: 中央研究院歷史語言研究所. ISBN 978-0009121760..
- Yuan, Jiahua (1989) [1960]. Hànyǔ fāngyán gàiyào 漢語方言概要 [An introduction to Chinese dialects]. Beijing: Wénzì gǎigé chūbǎnshè 文字改革出版社.
- Zhou, Zhenhe; You, Rujie (1986). Fāngyán yǔ zhōngguó wénhuà 方言与中国文化 [Dialects and Chinese culture]. Shanghai Renmin Chubanshe.
