= New Xiang =

Family of Chinese dialects

- Chang-Yi
- 长益片
- Native to: People's Republic of China
- Region: Hunan
- Speakers: 13.65 million (2012)
- Language family: Sino-Tibetan: Sinitic; Chinese; Xiang; New Xiang
- Writing system: Chinese characters

Language codes
- ISO 639-3: None (mis)
- ISO 639-6: cayi
- Glottolog: chan1316
- Linguasphere: 79-AAA-eaa
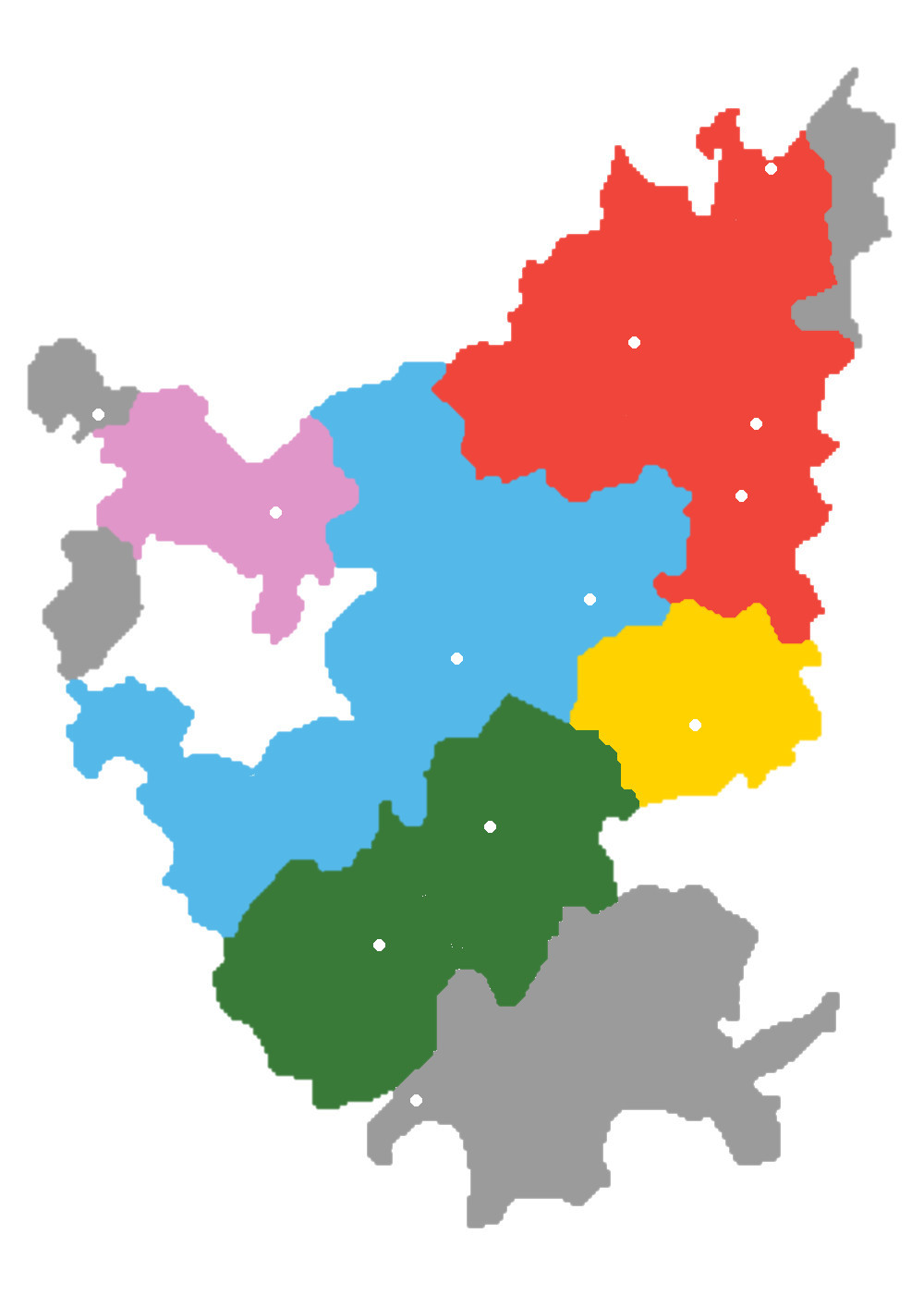
- New Xiang is in red. It is in contact with Southwestern Mandarin to the northwest, Gan to the east, Old Xiang to the west, and Hengzhou Xiang to the south (yellow).

New Xiang, also known as Chang-Yi (simplified Chinese: 长益片; traditional Chinese: 長益片; pinyin: Chǎng Yì piàn; lit. 'Changsha and Yiyang subgroup') is the dominant form of Xiang Chinese. It is spoken in northeastern areas of Hunan, China adjacent to areas where Southwestern Mandarin and Gan are spoken. Under their influence, it has lost some of the conservative phonological characteristics that distinguish Old Xiang. While most linguists follow Yuan Jiahua in describing New Xiang as a subgroup of Xiang Chinese, Zhou Zhenhe and You Rujie classify it as Southwestern Mandarin. However, New Xiang is still very difficult for Mandarin speakers to understand, particularly the old style of New Xiang.

== Dialects and regions ==
New Xiang-speaking cities and counties are mainly located in the northeast part of Hunan, the lower river of Xiang and Zi. The Changsha dialect is representative. There are three main subdialects under New Xiang.

Chang-Tan
Urban Changsha, Changsha County, Wangcheng District, Ningxiang, Liuyang*, Xiangyin, Miluo, Nanxian, Urban Zhuzhou, Zhuzhou County, Urban Xiangtan, Xiangtan County, Nanxian
Yi-Yuan
Urban Yiyang, Yuanjiang, Taojiang
Yueyang
Yueyang County, Yueyang

Suantang (酸汤) is a lect spoken by about 80,000 ethnic Miao people in Baibu (白布), Dihu (地湖), Dabaozi (大堡子), and Sanqiao (三锹) in Tianzhu, Huitong, and Jing counties of Hunan province. It is very similar to New Xiang, but it is unintelligible with Southwestern Mandarin.
