= Old Xiang =

Conservative Xiang Chinese language

- Lou-Shao
- Native to: People's Republic of China
- Region: Hunan
- Speakers: 12.96 million (2012)
- Language family: Sino-Tibetan: Sinitic; Chinese; Xiang; Old Xiang
- Writing system: Chinese characters

Language codes
- ISO 639-3: None (mis)
- ISO 639-6: louo
- Glottolog: luos1238
- Linguasphere: 79-AAA-eab
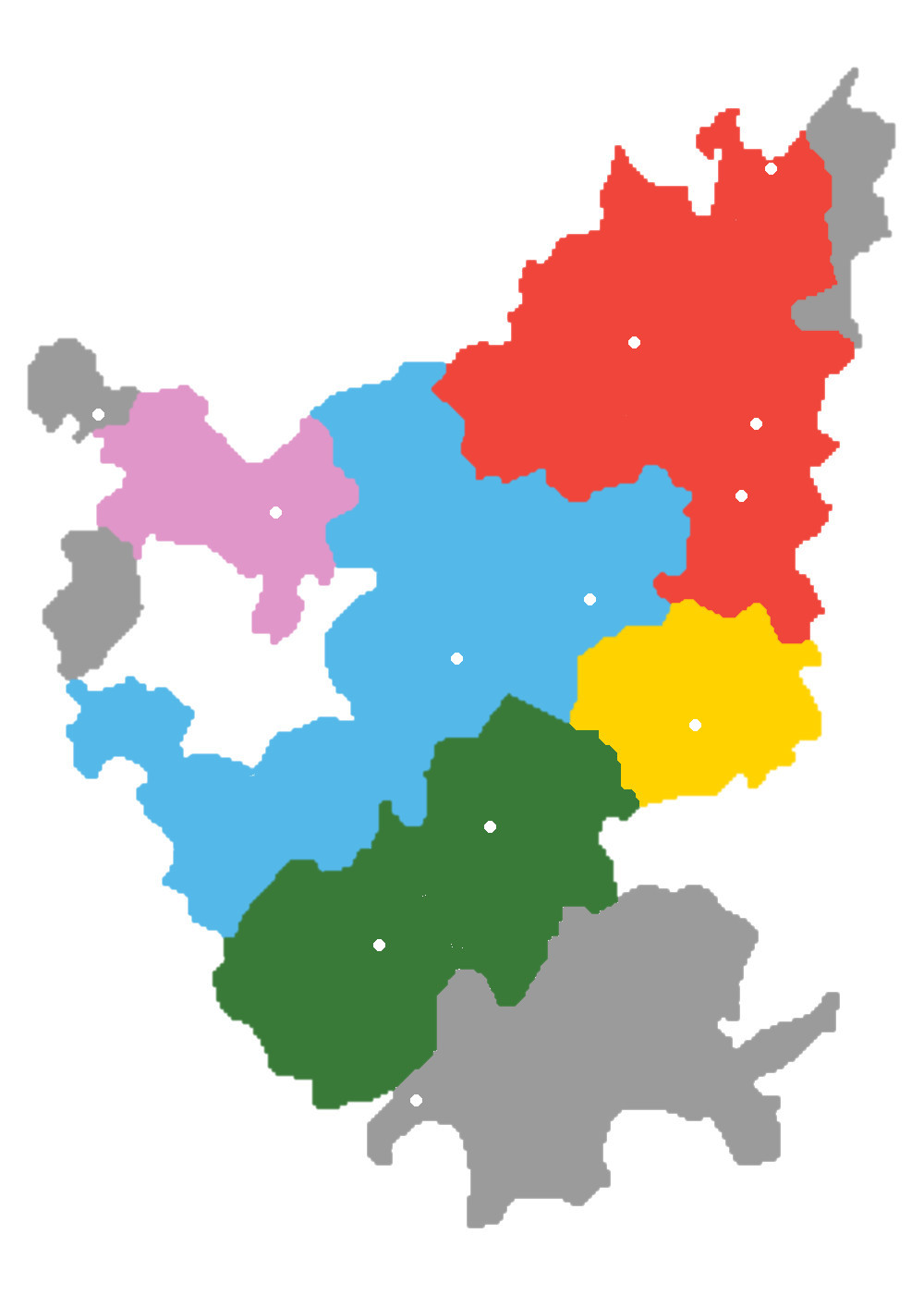
- Old Xiang is in blue. It is in contact with New Xiang (red), Ji-Xu Xiang (pink), Southwestern Mandarin, Gan, and Yong-Quan Xiang (dark green, south).

Old Xiang, also known as Lou-Shao (simplified Chinese: 娄邵片; traditional Chinese: 婁邵片; pinyin: Lóu Shào piàn; lit. 'Loudi and Shaoshan subgroup'), is a conservative Xiang Chinese language. It is spoken in the central areas of Hunan where it has been to some extent isolated from the neighboring Chinese languages, Southwestern Mandarin and Gan languages, and it retains the voiced plosives of Middle Chinese, which are otherwise only preserved in Wu languages like Shanghainese. See Shuangfeng dialect for details. Mao Zedong was a speaker of Old Xiang with his native Shaoshan dialect.

== Dialects and regions ==
The Shuangfeng dialect is representative.

| Subdialect | Main Counties |
|---|---|
| Xiang-Shuang | Xiangtan, Shuangfeng, Shaoshan, Urban Loudi, Anhua*, Hengshan* |
| Lian-Mei | Lianyuan, Lengshuijiang*, Anhua, Ningxiang* |
| Xinhua | Xinhua, Lengshuijiang |
| Shao-Wu | Urban Shaoyang, Wugang, Shaodong, Shaoyang County, Xinshao, Longhui*, Xinning, Chengbu, Dongkou* |
| Sui-Hui | Suining*, Huitong |
*Small part of this territory is Hunanese-speaking.

Laba Miao (喇叭苗话) is an Old Xiang dialect spoken by the Laba Miao people of western Guizhou. In Guizhou, it is spoken in Qinglong County 晴隆县 (including in Changliu Township 长流乡), Pu'an County 普安县, Liuzhi County 六枝县, Shuicheng County, 水城县, and Panzhou 盘州.

Matanghua (麻塘话) is a variety of Old Xiang that is spoken in Matang Ethnic Miao Township (麻塘苗族乡), Suining County, Hunan.
