= List of ISO 639-6 codes =

This is a partial list of language codes from the withdrawn ISO 639-6 standard.

639-6	639-3	eng
ango	ang	Old English
bicr		Bai
bjgh		Beijing Mandarin
bjjg		Beijing
cagj		Chang-Jing
cayi		New Xiang
cuqu		Chuqu Wu
dbiu		Northeastern Mandarin
dton		Da-Tong
emen		Early Modern English
fuji		Fuqing
fuua		Fu'an
fzho		Fuzhou
goya		Gao-Yang Yue
goyu		Guoyu
gulu		Goulou Yue
guzg		Guanzhong
hgou		Hangzhou
hhjm		Hachjiō
hife		Haifeng
htia		Taiwanese Hakka
huyu		Huayu
jiix		Ji−Xu Xiang
jiua		Jinhua
jliu		Jiaoliao
jlua		Jliu Mandarin
jnha		Junjiahua
louo		Old Xiang
lyiu		Lan−Yin
mclr		Min
mdgr	gmh	Middle High German
meng	enm	Middle English
plig		Changzhou
qnli		Qin−Lian Yue
sazo		Tuhua
shiq		Shiqi
siiy		Siyi Yue
stns		Satinese
suji		Suzhou
taiu		Taihu Wu
tigz		Tingzhou
tisa		Taishanese
tjin		Tianjin
tzoj		Taizhou
vlca		Valencian
wceg		Wencheng
whua		Wu−Hua Yue
wxwa	www	Wawa
wzhu		Wenzhouese
xghu		Southwestern Mandarin
xgng		Hong Kong Cantonese
yilu		Yi-Liu
yiyi		Ying-Yi
yoxu		Yong−Xun Yue
zgyu		Zhongyuan Mandarin
