= Qin–Lian Yue =

Yue Chinese dialect of Guangxi, China

Qin-Lian
- Hamlim Jijin / Hamlim Jujin
- Native to: China
- Region: Guangxi
- Native speakers: About 3,900,000 (2013)
- Language family: Sino-Tibetan: Sinitic; Chinese; Yue; Qin-Lian

Language codes
- ISO 639-3: None (mis)
- ISO 639-6: qnli
- Glottolog: qinl1235
- Linguasphere: 79-AAA-mf
- Qin-Lian (lower left), among other Yue and Pinghua groups in Guangxi and Guangdong

The Qin–Lian language (Hamlim Jijin or Hamlim Jujin; Chinese: 欽廉语言; from the names of Qinzhou and Lianzhou) is a southern branch of Yue Chinese spoken in the coastal part of Guangxi, including 3 main cities: Beihai, Qinzhou, Fangchenggang, and four subject counties: Hepu, Pubei, Lingshan, Dongxing.

== Etymology ==
Qin–Lian refers to Qinzhou (Hamzau/Yamchow) and Lianzhou (Limzau/Limchow), the latter being the former name of Hepu and the historical prefecture of Guangdong it commanded. Other collective names for these areas include 'Beihai-Qingzhou-Fangchenggang' (Chinese: 北欽防) and 'Beibu Gulf Area' (Chinese: 北部灣地區).

== Characteristics ==
Middle Chinese had a series of voiced initials, but voicing has been lost throughout Yue and most other modern Chinese varieties apart from Wu and Old Xiang. The reflexes of the voiced stops and affricates are often used to classify Chinese varieties.

In most Qin–Lian varieties, these consonants develop into aspirates in all tones, a pattern also found in Wu–Hua Yue and Hakka, which is also the traditional criterion of Qin-Lian Yue. However, in urban Qin–Lian varieties they yield aspirates in the level and rising tones, and non-aspirates in the departing and entering tones, the same pattern found in the Guangfu, Siyi and Gao-Yang branches of Yue. In spite of distinguishable but tiny differences on phonology and vocabulary, there is high mutual intelligibility and a great number of common colloquial words in the urban varieties and furthermore, in some varieties of Yong-Xun and Gao-Yang. Those features along with its scattered speaking zones may reflect the influence of intercity commercial communication in history, and lead to a lasting debate on its classification.

== Subgroups ==
- Plain Speech (PS, Chinese: 白話, Yale romanization: bàakwà; jyutping: baak6 waa6) are mostly spoken in the major urban areas of the cities Qinzhou, Beihai, Fangchenggang, and the counties Dongxing and Lingshan. They are very close to and highly similar with Standard Cantonese, and sometimes they are defined as 'Cantonese (Yuehai variety) Languages in Qin-Lian areas'. Each of them share highly close even same consonant shifting pattern at some point compared with Standard Cantonese. However, they are hard to be mutually intelligible with other Qin-Lian non-Cantonese Languages.
  - Beihai dialect
  - Qinzhou dialect
  - Fangcheng dialect
  - Lingshan downtown dialect
- Transitional dialects
  The transitional Qinlian-Gaoyang-Yuehai (Plain Speech dialect continuum of South Guangxi-West Guangdong-PRD) dialects spoken by some minorities in Beihai. In this dialects group, the speakers have significantly personal characters. The elder may but not all traditionally possess accents of Yuehai (popularly known as 'Standard Cantonese') or West Guangdong's as the language core, alongside the elements of Beihai accent (or "Pakhoi accent"). The young and middle age are tend to be naturalized by native Beihai accent with some obvious accents elements from Yuehai.
  - Naamhong dialect (Chinese: 南康白話), is only spoken in the downtown of Town of Nankang, Beihai. This dialect is closer to Gao-Yang and Yuehai more than Beihai. However, the most widely used in Town of Nankang is Nga Language, mostly in hinterland.
  - Tanka dialect
    (Chinese: 蜑家話) is spoken by Tanka People who are mostly living in Waishaqiao (Chinese: 外沙橋), the north bank of Beihai, some very elderly people speak in the absolute Tanka accent (a special subgroup of Yuehai), the middle age and the young speak in mixed accents with Beihai PS.
  - Overseas-Chinese Plain Speech
    (Chinese: 華僑白話) is spoken by the people living in Town of Qiaogang, Beihai, majorly consist of Chinese-Vietnamese refugees expelled during the anti-China protest in Vietnam in 1975. Overseas-Chinese accents are complex, the minority speak in accents of Yuehai or Tanka, the majority speak in a mixed accent with Beihai PS, or minorer Limchownese Language.
  - Saanhau dialect
    (Chinese: 山口白話) is only spoken in the downtown of Town of Shankou Beihai, which is the border Province of Guangxi and Province of Guangdong. It is close to Guangzhou Cantonese.
- Lianzhou dialect (Limzau), also called hoi caat waa (海獺話, "the tongue of the sea otters") and maa lau waa(麻佬話, "the tongue of people in sackcloth"), are spoken in Hepu(Lianzhou as the center city), in the southern part of Pubei and in the coastal areas of Qinzhou and Fangchenggang.
- Nga dialect
- Coastal dialects (Chinese: 海邊話), also named Civilian Language (Chinese: 百姓話) is spoken in Town of Shatian Beihai. This language is debatable which languages group it belongs to, sometimes it will be stated as Min Language. However, it shares many indigenous words with Limchownese Language and Nga Language.
- Lingshan dialect (Lingsaan, Chinese: 靈山話) are widely spoken in the countryside of Lingshan and Pubei Qinzhou.
- Xiaojiang dialect (Sliugong, Chinese: 小江話) is spoken in Xiaojiang (Sliugong), the downtown of Pubei.
- Slanlap dialect (Chinese: 新立話) is spoken in District of Qinbei, north of Qinzhou. 'Slanlap' (Chinese: 新立) is a historical name in northern Qinzhou.

== Phonology ==
The table below shows the differences in phonology among Cantonese varieties.

Sound changes	IPA	Qinzhou	Fangcheng	Lingshan	Beihai
Vowel breaking of "i"	/i/ > /ei/	no	no	some words	yes
ou > au merger	/ǝu/ > /ɐu/	yes	yes	no	yes
oe > e merger	/øɔ/ > /eɐ/	younger speakers	some speakers	yes	yes
i > z shifting	/i/ > /ɿ/	no	some speakers, mainly young female	no	some speakers, which might be influenced by other language.
Terminal consonants merger, mix or miss	/-p/ /-t/ /-k/ > /-ʔ/	no	no	no	some younger speakers
