= Fangcheng Yue Dialect =

Dialect of Yue Chinese

Fangcheng Yue
- 防城白話
- Native to: China, Vietnam
- Region: Fangchenggang/Fongsinggong, Mong Cai
- Language family: Sino-Tibetan: Sinitic; Yue/Jyut; Qin-Lian Yue/Hamlim Jyut; Fangcheng Yue

Language codes
- ISO 639-3: –

The Fangcheng dialect (Chinese: 防城白話; local Jyutping: Fong^{4}sing^{4} baak^{4}waa^{4}; IPA: [fɔŋ˩˨ ɕeɪŋ˩˨ pak̚˨ ʋa˩˨], lit. 'Fangcheng plain speech') also rendered Fongsing Jyut dialect, is a dialect of Yue (Cantonese), spoken in the southern area closer to the sea of former Fangcheng County(防城縣), which was divided present-day Dongxing City(東興市), Fangcheng District(防城區) and Gangkou District(港口區).

As a variety of Cantonese, it is intelligible with Guangzhou Cantonese.

Due to the policy on the promotion of Putonghua and the influx of foreign population who doesn't speak Yue Chinese, the level of dialect use among local young people is declining.

== Phonology ==
=== Initials ===
Except for most of the consonants that are the same as in Standard Cantonese, there are also several other consonants in Fangcheng Yue Dialect. The extended Jyutping(Jyut++) will be used to transcribe the phonemes as follows.

		Labial	Dental		Palatal	Velar		Glottal
		Labial	Dental		Palatal	Normal	Labialized	
Nasal		/m/ ⟨m⟩	/n/ ⟨n⟩		[ɲ] ⟨nj⟩	/ŋ/ ⟨ng⟩		
Plosive	tenuis	/p/ ⟨b⟩	/t/ ⟨d⟩			/k/ ⟨g⟩	/kʷ/ ⟨gw⟩	(ʔ)
Plosive	aspirated	/pʰ/ ⟨p⟩	/tʰ/ ⟨t⟩			/kʰ/ ⟨k⟩	/kʰʷ/ ⟨kw⟩	
Affricate	tenuis				/tɕ/ ⟨z⟩			
Affricate	aspirated				/tɕʰ/ ⟨c⟩			
Fricative		/f/ ⟨f⟩			/ɕ/ ⟨s⟩			/h/ ⟨h⟩
Approximant		/ʋ/ ⟨v⟩	/l/ ⟨l⟩	/ɬ/ ⟨sl⟩	/j/ ⟨j⟩			

=== Rimes ===
Fangcheng Yue has six vowels, a, ɐ, ɛ, i, ɔ, and u.

	Front	Central	Back
Close	/i/ ⟨i⟩		/u/ ⟨u⟩
Mid	/ɛ/ ⟨e⟩	/ɐ/ ⟨a⟩	/ɔ/ ⟨o⟩
Open		/a/ ⟨aa⟩	

And two diphthongs only exist before -ŋ and -k, each pair of sounds of theirs has almost equal weight respectively, which do not lend themselves to analysis as ending analyzed to ending as -j or -w phonemely.

- /e͡ɐ/ ⟨e⟩
- /ø͡ɔ/ ⟨oe⟩ Some speakers pronounce /ø͡ɔ/ as /e͡ɐ/, just like the younger speakers of neighboring Qinzhou Dialect.

=== Finals ===
Moreover, Fangcheng Yue finals exhibit the final consonants found in Middle Chinese, namely [m, n, ŋ, p, t, k]. Which are romanized as m, n, ng, p, t, and k respectively.

Finals of Fangcheng Yue dialect
nucleus	note	coda								
nucleus	note	-∅	-i	-u	-m	-n	-ŋ	-p	-t	-k
-a-	IPA	a	ai	au	am	an	aŋ	ap	at	ak
-a-	e.g.	花 faa^{1}	買 maai^{2}	鬧 naau^{4}	藍 laam^{4}	山 saan^{1}	冷 laang^{2}	鴨 aap^{3}	襪 maat^{4}	白 baak^{4}
-a-	meaning	flower	to buy	to scold	blue	mountain	cold	duck	sock	white
-ɛ-	IPA	ɛ		ɛu	ɛm	ɛn	e͡ɐŋ	ɛp	ɛt	e͡ɐk
-ɛ-	e.g.	車 ce^{1}		貓 meu^{1}	鉗 kem^{4}	剪 zen^{2}	贏 jeng^{4}	碟 dep^{4}	裂 let^{3}	赤 cek^{3}
-ɛ-	meaning	car		cat	plicer	to cut(use scissors)	to win	(small)dish	to split	red
-ø͡ɔ-	IPA							ø͡ɔŋ	ø͡ɔt	ø͡ɔk
-ø͡ɔ-	e.g.							梁 loeng^{4}	噦 oet^{4}	脚 goek^{3}
-ø͡ɔ-	meaning							lintel; a surname Leung, Liang etc.	yuck_{(an onomatopoeia for vomiting)}	foot
-i-	∅-	i		iu	im	in	eɪŋ	ip	it	eɪk
Syllabics							ŋ̩			

=== Tone ===
Fangcheng Yue dialect has 6 or 7 tones.

Name	Tone contour	Description	Example	Number	five-scale IPA
Yin-level (jam^{1}-ping^{4} 陰平)	˦˥	high rising	衣	1	45
Rising tone (soeng^{2}-seng^{1} 上聲)	˩˧	middle level	子	2	13
Yin-departing (jam^{1}-hi^{3} 陰去)	˧˧	middle level	貢	3	21
Upper Yin-entering (soeng^{4}-jam^{1}-jap^{4} 上陰入)	˥	high stopped	谷	1	5
Lower Yin-entering (haa^{4}-jam^{1}-jap^{4} 下陰入)	˧	middle stopped	百	3	3
Yang-level (joeng^{4}-ping^{4} 陽平)	˩˨	low falling	群	4	21
Yang-entering (joeng^{4}-jap^{4} 陽入)	˨	low stopped	物	4	2
High rising (gau^{1}-gong^{3}-diu^{4} 高降調)	˥˧	high rising	乜	`53	53
