= Cantonese poetry =

Cantonese poetry (Chinese: 粵詩; Jyutping: Jyut6 si1) is poetry performed and composed primarily by Cantonese people. Most of this body of poetry uses classical Chinese grammar, but has been composed with Cantonese phonology in mind and needs to be read in the Cantonese language in order to rhyme.

== Relation to Middle Chinese literature ==
Among extant Sinitic languages, Cantonese retains relatively many features of Middle Chinese phonology. Middle Chinese was the prestige language of the Tang dynasty (7th to 10th century) and Song dynasty (10th to 13th century). The works of literature from these dynasties (such as Tang poetry) have been considered some of the best works of literature from all of Chinese dynasties. Due to its closeness to Middle Chinese, Cantonese is very useful for studying these great works of literature. This is reflected by the fact that most Tang poems will rhyme better if read in Cantonese.

== Lingnan school of poetry ==
Zhang Jiuling (張九齢; Zoeng1 gau2 ling4) was a poet of the Tang dynasty, and he was born and raised in what is modern-day Guangdong. Twelve of his poems were listed in Three Hundred Tang Poems, a compilation of the finest works of Tang poetry. He has been considered the earliest Cantonese poet, although Yue Chinese had not yet fully formed at that time. In the centuries that followed, there have been numerous poets of varying levels of prominence from the area of Guangdong, resulting in the formation of Lingnan school of poetry (嶺南詩派; Ling5 naam4 si1 paai3), named after Lingnan, the region covering the modern provinces of Guangdong and Guangxi. Stylistically, this school has been noted for having two streams of poetry. On one hand, there were poets like Zhang Jiuling, who preferred to follow royal standards at that time, while poets like Shao Ye (邵謁; Siu6 kit3) composed poems marked by little use of rhetoric. Both streams, however, composed poetry using classical Chinese grammars - while these poems still tend to use Cantonese phonology, they certainly do not sound like everyday Cantonese speech. Aside from this, this school is noted for maintaining Middle Chinese pronunciations for Chinese characters, involving imagery unique to the Lingnan region, and a spirit of revolution. This style has been described as "magnificent and vigorous" (雄直; Hung4 zik6).

In terms of formats, the Lingnan school of poetry is largely similar to poems composed by other Han Chinese groups.

== Ming Dynasty development ==
The term "Lingnan school of poetry" was coined by the Ming Dynasty (14th to 17th century) scholar Hu Yinglin. At that time, the Lingnan school, alongside the schools of Wuyue, Hokkien, and Gan poetry, was listed as one of the great schools of poetry in all of China. In the 17th century (late Ming period), the "three great experts of Lingnan" (嶺南三家; Ling5 naam4 saam1 gaa1), advocated greater realism in Chinese-language poetry. They composed poetry that depicted the hardship faced by average peasants, which was considered quite unorthodox at that time.

== Vernacular Cantonese poetry ==
Cantonese poetry saw further development in the late 19th century, where the Cantonese poet Liu Entao (廖恩燾; Liu6 jan1 tou4; 1863–1954) composed poetry in vernacular Cantonese — poems that actually sound like everyday Cantonese speech. His works have seen a rise in popularity in recent years, compiled in the "Play and smile collection" (嬉笑集; Hei1 siu3 zaap6).

== Recent development ==
Since the 21st century, Cantonese people have started studying their own style of poetry in great depth. A compilation entitled "All Cantonese poems" (全粵詩; Cyun4 jyut6 si1) has been produced to compile works of past Cantonese poets. Currently, it spans 30 volumes and is yet to be completed.

== See also ==
- Written Cantonese
- Cantonese culture
- Tang poetry
- Chinese poetry
- Hong Kong literature
