= Gan Chinese speakers =

Han Chinese ethnic subgroup

Jiangyou people 江右民系
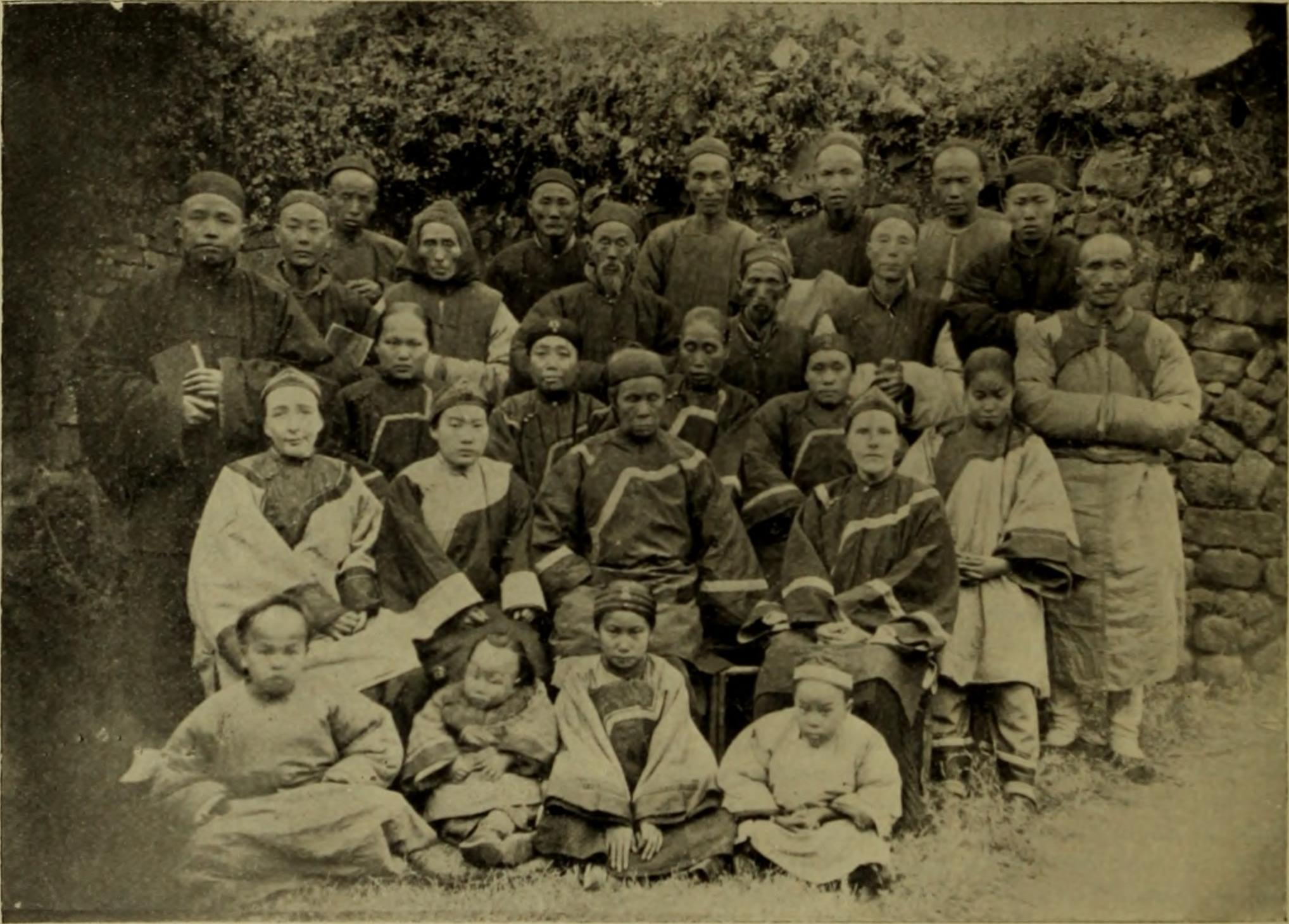
- A group of Christians from Jiangxi, 1898.

Total population
- 48 million (2004)

Regions with significant populations
- People's Republic of China: Jiangxi eastern Hunan parts of Shaanxi parts of Fujian parts of Anhui; Northern Guangdong
- Republic of China (on Taiwan): As part of Waishengren population

Languages
- Gan Chinese (primarily), Mandarin Chinese

Religion
- Mahayana Buddhism, Taoism, Confucianism, and Chinese folk religion

The Jiangyou people, also known as Gan-Chinese speaking people (Chinese: 江右民系; pinyin: Jiāngyòu mínxì, Nanchang dialect: Gan Chinese pronunciation: [tɕiɔŋ˦˨iu˦˥ min˨˩ɕi˦˥]), are a Han Chinese ethnolinguistic subgroup originating from Jiangxi province in China, who speak Gan Chinese. Gan-Chinese speaking people populations are also found in Fujian, southern Anhui and Hubei provinces, and linguistic enclaves are found on Shaanxi, Sichuan, Zhejiang, Hunan, Hainan, Guangdong, Fujian and non-Gan-Chinese speaking southern and western Jiangxi.

== History ==
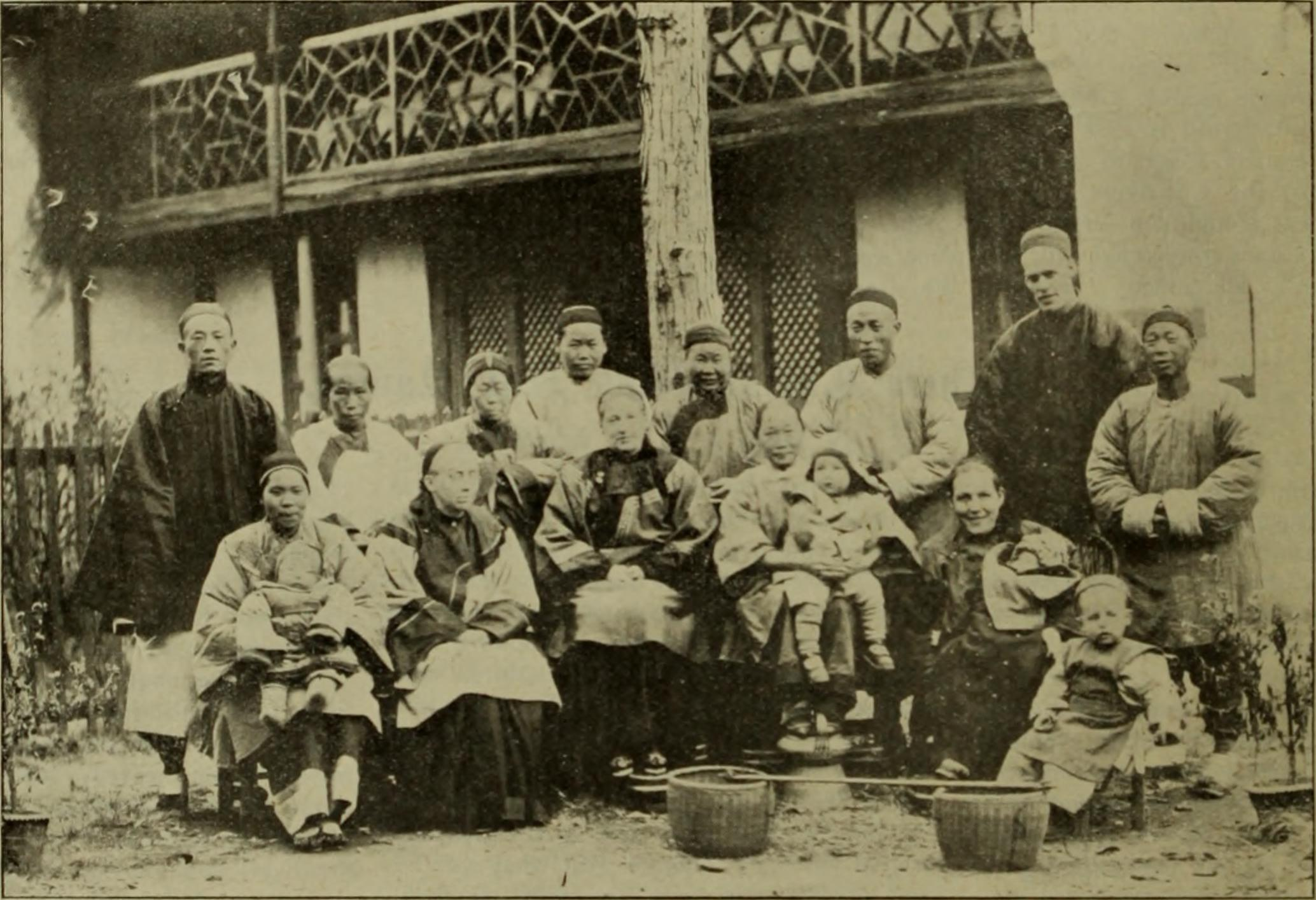
A household in Yushan County, Jiangxi, 1898.

The historic homeland of Gan speakers, Jiangxi, was outside the sphere of influence of early Chinese civilization during the Shang dynasty (16th to 11th centuries BCE). Information about this era is scarce, but it is likely that peoples collectively known as the Yue inhabited the region.

The unification of China by the Qin dynasty saw the incorporation of Jiangxi into the Qin empire. The First Emperor of Qin established seven counties in Jiangxi, all of them administered from the commandery seat of Jiujiang, located north of the Yangzi in modern Anhui. All of the commandery seats were located along the Gan River system. Military settlements were known to have existed at least two of the counties. The Qin colonisation formed the earliest settlement structure in Jiangxi and which for the most part, has survived to the present day.

During the early Ming dynasty, there was a forced massive population transfer of Gan speakers living in Jiangxi to depopulated northern and eastern parts of both Hunan and Hubei provinces. This large-scale resettlement caused the formation of the New Xiang dialect in Hunan. Gan speakers were again forcefully resettled into parts of Hunan and Hubei due to war caused depopulation during the early period of the Qing dynasty known as "江西填湖广" in Chinese.

== Culture ==
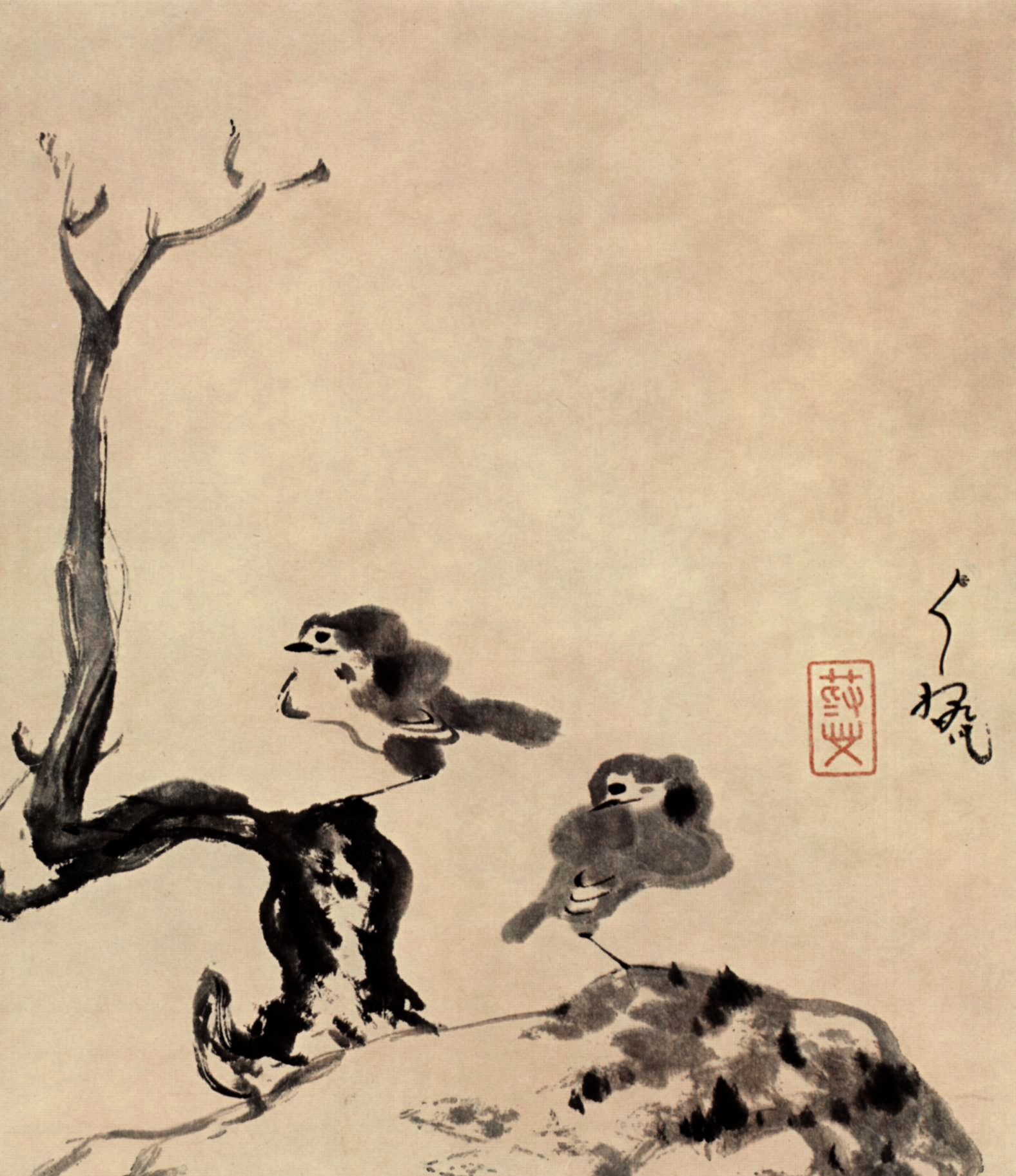
Painting by Gan speaker Bada Shanren (1626—1705).

=== Language ===
Jiangxi is the main area of concentration of the Gan varieties of Chinese, spoken over most of the northern two-thirds of the province. Examples include the Nanchang dialect, Yichun dialect and Ji'an dialect. The southern one-third of the province speaks Hakka. There are also Mandarin, Huizhou, and Wu dialects spoken along the northern border.

=== Cuisine ===
Jiangxi cuisine or Gan cuisine is unique in its style and flavours, which rely on heavy use of chili peppers as well as pickled and fermented products.

=== Others ===
Jingdezhen is widely regarded as the producer of the best porcelain in China.

Jiangxi also was a historical center of Chan Buddhism.

Ganju, or Jiangxi opera, is the type of Chinese opera performed in Jiangxi.

== Areas of significant population ==
Gan-Chinese speaking people are found primarily in Jiangxi, Fujian, Anhui, Hunan, and Hubei provinces.

=== Enclaves within Shaanxi ===
Jiangxi Gan-chinese speaking enclaves are found in villages scattered across Shangnan, Danfeng, Shanyang, Zhashui, Zhen'an, Hanbin, and Shiquan counties in Shaanxi province. The Mandarin-speaking population of Shaanxi refers to the Gan language as spoken in Shaanxi as Manzihua (蠻子話), or 'Barbarian speech'.

=== Enclaves in Hubei ===
There are roughly 5.3 million Gan-Chinese speaking people living in Hubei, mostly concentrated in its eastern region.

=== Enclaves within Guangdong ===
There are about 20,000 Gan-Chinese speaking people living in Guangdong province, primarily in Nanxiong county and other districts. Hakka-speaking locals refer to the Gan language spoken in Northeastern Guangdong as Jiangxihua (江西話).

=== Enclaves within Sichuan ===
Gan-Chinese speaking people are also found in Daqiao district in Huidong county in Sichuan province.

=== Enclaves within Fujian ===
There are 270,000 Gan-Chinese speaking people mainly living in North-western Fujian.

=== Enclaves within Guizhou ===
Qiandongnan Miao and Dong Autonomous Prefecture also has a Gan-speaking minority.

=== Enclaves within Hainan ===
In Danzhou, Changjiang, and Sanya, some villages speak a "Hakka-Gan dialect".

=== Enclaves within Taiwan ===
According to the Presbyterian Church in Taiwan, the number of Jiangxi people living in Taiwan is 124,670 in 1992. Thus the number of Gan speaker descendants is around 100 to 200 thousand.

== Notable Gan-Chinese speaking people descendants ==
- Ouyang Xiu, Jinshi scholar
- Yuan Longping (Chinese: 袁隆平; born September 7, 1930) is a Chinese agronomist and educator, known for developing the first hybrid rice varieties.
- Xie Jin, Chief Grand Secretary of the Ming Empire.
- Liu Shaoqi, Chairman of the People's Republic of China
- Ang Lee, Taiwanese movie director
- Ouyang Nana, Taiwanese actress
