= Bancheng =

Bancheng may refer to the following locations in China:

- Bancheng, Guangxi (板城镇), town in Qinbei District, Qinzhou
- Bancheng, Hebei (板城镇), town in Kuancheng Manchu Autonomous County
- Bancheng, Jiangsu (半城镇), town in Sihong County
