= Streptomyces qinzhouensis =

Scientific classification
- Domain: Bacteria
- Kingdom: Bacillati
- Phylum: Actinomycetota
- Class: Actinomycetia
- Order: Streptomycetales
- Family: Streptomycetaceae
- Genus: Streptomyces
- Species: S. qinzhouensis

Binomial name
- Streptomyces qinzhouensis Zhu et al. 2020

Type strain
- SSL-25

Species of bacterium

Streptomyces qinzhouensis is a bacterium species from the genus of Streptomyces which has been isolated from soil from the QinzhouBay in China.

== See also ==
- List of Streptomyces species
