= Fangchenggang =

Fangchenggang 防城港市 · Fangzcwngzgangj Si
- Prefecture-level city
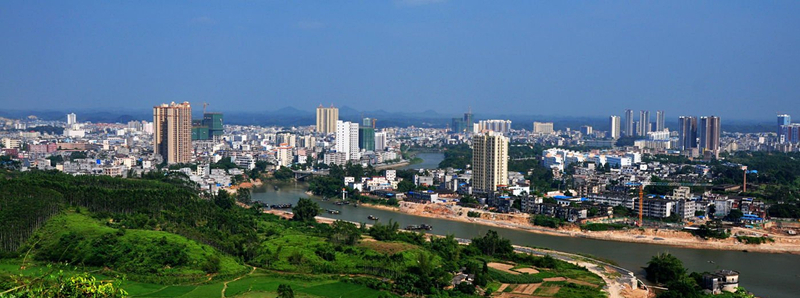

- Location of Fangchenggang City jurisdiction in Guangxi

- Location in China
- Coordinates (Fangchenggang government): 21°41′12″N 108°21′17″E
- Country: People's Republic of China
- Region: Guangxi
- Municipal seat: Gangkou District

Area
  - Total: 6,181 km^{2} (2,386 sq mi)

Population (2022)
  - Total: 1,059,100
  - Density: 171.3/km^{2} (443.8/sq mi)

GDP
  - Total: CN¥ 81.6 billion US$ 12.6 billion
  - Per capita: CN¥ 77,548; US$ 12,020
- Time zone: UTC+8 (China Standard)
- Postal code: 538000
- Area code: 0770
- ISO 3166 code: CN-GX-06
- Website: fcgs.gov.cn

Fangchenggang

Chinese name
- Chinese: 防城港市
Transcriptions
Standard Mandarin
- Hanyu Pinyin: Fángchénggǎng Shì
Yue: Cantonese
- Jyutping: fong4 seng4 gong2 si5

Vietnamese name
- Vietnamese alphabet: Thành phố Phòng Thành Cảng
- Chữ Hán: 城庯防城港

Zhuang name
- Zhuang: Fangzcwngzgangj Si
- 1957 orthography: Faŋƨcɯŋƨgaŋз Si

Fangchenggang (Chinese: 防城港 "Port of Fangcheng") is a prefecture-level city in the south of Guangxi Zhuang Autonomous Region, People's Republic of China.

Fangchenggang is the southernmost port in China and is located in Fangcheng. It primarily services bulk carriers, of up to 180,000 t (180,000 long tons; 200,000 short tons) deadweight tons in size. The closest airport is located in Van Don, about 91 km away (1 hour drive). As of December 2018, the region had large amounts of land reclamation in progress to build new and additional ports. The resident population of the city in 2024 will be 1,079,800.

== History ==
The city was formerly called "Fangcheng Pan-Ethnicities Autonomous County" (December 25, 1978 – May 23, 1993).

== Geography and climate ==
Fangchenggang is a coastal city in southern Guangxi that borders Quảng Ninh, northeastern Vietnam. Its area is 6,242.94 km^{2} (2,410.41 sq mi), 120 km^{2} (46 sq mi) of that urban.

Climate data for Fangchenggang, elevation 49 m (161 ft), (1991–2020 normals, extremes 1981–present)
| Month | Jan | Feb | Mar | Apr | May | Jun | Jul | Aug | Sep | Oct | Nov | Dec | Year |
|---|---|---|---|---|---|---|---|---|---|---|---|---|---|
| Record high °C (°F) | 26.3 (79.3) | 28.1 (82.6) | 29.8 (85.6) | 33.1 (91.6) | 34.5 (94.1) | 37.4 (99.3) | 36.5 (97.7) | 37.4 (99.3) | 36.9 (98.4) | 33.6 (92.5) | 31.2 (88.2) | 28.1 (82.6) | 37.4 (99.3) |
| Mean daily maximum °C (°F) | 17.4 (63.3) | 18.7 (65.7) | 21.3 (70.3) | 25.9 (78.6) | 29.5 (85.1) | 30.9 (87.6) | 31.2 (88.2) | 31.5 (88.7) | 31.0 (87.8) | 28.7 (83.7) | 24.8 (76.6) | 20.0 (68.0) | 25.9 (78.6) |
| Daily mean °C (°F) | 14.3 (57.7) | 15.7 (60.3) | 18.5 (65.3) | 23.0 (73.4) | 26.6 (79.9) | 28.4 (83.1) | 28.7 (83.7) | 28.4 (83.1) | 27.6 (81.7) | 25.0 (77.0) | 21.1 (70.0) | 16.5 (61.7) | 22.8 (73.1) |
| Mean daily minimum °C (°F) | 12.2 (54.0) | 13.6 (56.5) | 16.4 (61.5) | 21.1 (70.0) | 24.5 (76.1) | 26.2 (79.2) | 26.4 (79.5) | 26.0 (78.8) | 25.0 (77.0) | 22.4 (72.3) | 18.5 (65.3) | 14.0 (57.2) | 20.5 (69.0) |
| Record low °C (°F) | 2.3 (36.1) | 2.8 (37.0) | 7.5 (45.5) | 9.1 (48.4) | 15.3 (59.5) | 21.3 (70.3) | 22.2 (72.0) | 21.4 (70.5) | 16.1 (61.0) | 15.0 (59.0) | 7.7 (45.9) | 3.5 (38.3) | 2.3 (36.1) |
| Average precipitation mm (inches) | 51.5 (2.03) | 35.3 (1.39) | 53.7 (2.11) | 79.8 (3.14) | 233.1 (9.18) | 458.1 (18.04) | 569.2 (22.41) | 478.7 (18.85) | 283.5 (11.16) | 121.4 (4.78) | 79.2 (3.12) | 37.6 (1.48) | 2,481.1 (97.69) |
| Average precipitation days (≥ 0.1 mm) | 9.7 | 11.1 | 14.3 | 12.0 | 14.1 | 17.9 | 18.6 | 19.0 | 13.3 | 7.4 | 7.2 | 7.6 | 152.2 |
| Average relative humidity (%) | 75 | 80 | 84 | 83 | 82 | 84 | 83 | 83 | 77 | 71 | 70 | 67 | 78 |
| Mean monthly sunshine hours | 70.5 | 56.1 | 57.2 | 100.3 | 163.9 | 155.6 | 184.9 | 186.9 | 193.4 | 194.2 | 151.9 | 116.0 | 1,630.9 |
| Percentage possible sunshine | 21 | 17 | 15 | 26 | 40 | 39 | 45 | 47 | 53 | 54 | 46 | 35 | 37 |
Source: China Meteorological Administrationall-time record low

== Administration ==
Fangchenggang has two urban districts, one county, one county-level city, 17 townships, six towns, 283 villages, and seven subdistricts.

Districts:

- Gangkou District (港口区)
- Fangcheng District (防城区)

County-level city:

- Dongxing (东兴市)

County:

- Shangsi County (上思县)

Map
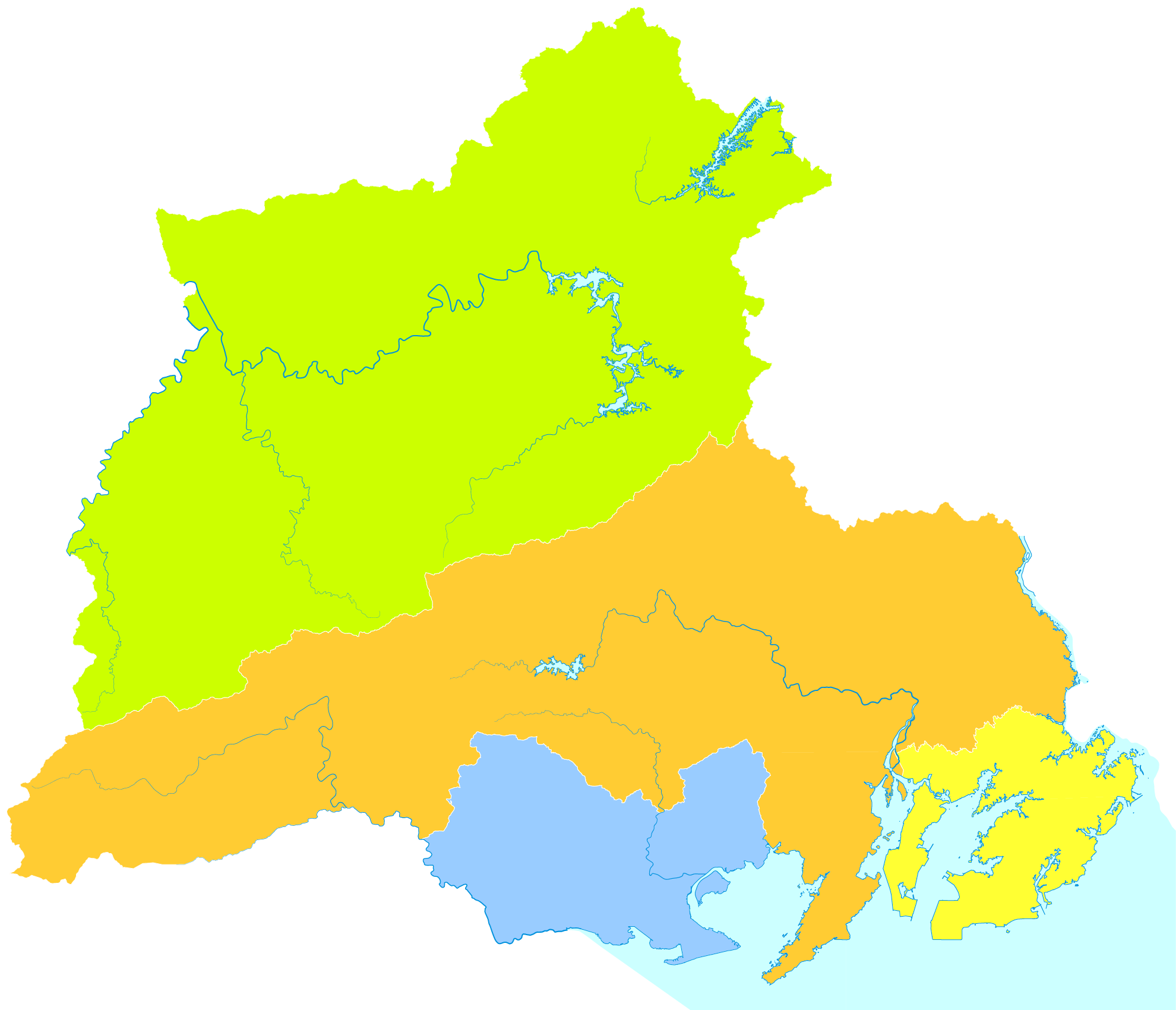

== Demographics ==
Fangchenggang has a total population of 717,966. Ethnic groups and their corresponding numbers are Han 390,286 or 54.36%, Zhuang 287,207 or 40% Yao 26,749 or 3.73%, Jing 12,288 or 1.71% and all other minorities combined 1,436 or 0.02%. Population density is 116 people per km^{2} and population growth is 7.75% annually.

Fangchenggang is a linguistically diverse city. The local languages include Qin-Lian Yue (a branch of Yue Chinese), Hakka, Zhuang, Yao, and Vietnamese, of which the most dominant language is Yue.

== Economy ==
Fanchenggang, the last part of which "gang" means port is as its name implies an important port for Guangxi, and other than Beihai the only major Chinese port on the Tonkin Gulf.

Besides port related industries there is substantial tourism, commercial fishing, hydropower, food and beverage production, and agriculture. Agricultural products include rice, corn, peanuts, oranges, and sugarcane. Other natural resources are coal, limestone, and spring water. The first phase of Fangchenggang Nuclear Power Plant, a nuclear power plant project is under construction here.

Fangchenggang is served by rail from Qinzhou East and Nanning, respectively. Since the end of 2013, the city's Fangchenggang North Railway Station has high-speed (D-series) train service from Nanning. As of March 2019, there were two trains daily (T type) to Qinzhou and 9 trains (D type) daily to Nanning railway station.

== Flora and fauna ==
Like much of Guangxi, there are many forested mountains and stream filled valleys. The area along the border with Vietnam is relatively undeveloped and draws considerable tourism. Fangchenggang's forests contain more than 500 types of plants, more than 4000 medicinal plants and herbs, 25 species of mammals, and many species of insects, reptiles, amphibians, and birds. Many nationally protected animals can still be found in Fangchenggang such as gibbons, frogs, butterflies, and tortoises. In the ocean waters, whales, dolphins, and dugongs can be seen.

The city flower of Fangchenggang Camellia nitidissima (金花茶, lit. 'golden flower tea', Mandarin: Jīnhuāchá, Fangcheng Yue: [kɐm˦˥ fa˦˥ tɕʰa˧˩], Fangcheng Hakka: [kim˦˥ fa˦˥ tɕʰa˩˧]), which is and a kind of quite rare Camellia plant only attribute in the area near the border between Vietnam and Guangxi. The flowers of Camellia nitidissima are made as bagged dried flowers for making tea and sell as a local specialty.

== Culture ==
=== Tea-picking opera ===
Tea-picking opera is the most popular traditional Chinese opera in Fangchenggang, in some grant occasions, celebrations and events such as fuels, traditionally the organizers of those will hire a tea-picking opera company to perform.

Nowadays, tea-picking opera actors generally speak Fangcheng Yue dialect in performances, but not entirely; they consciously or unconsciously make their pronunciation approach that of Guangzhou Cantonese, which is considered the standard dialect of Cantonese.

== Notable people ==
- Chen Jitang, military officer during the era of Nationalist China
