= Shangsi =

Shangsi may refer to:

- Shangsi County, in Guangxi, China
- Shangsi Festival, ancient tradition in China
