= Yichun =

Yichun may refer to:

- Yichun, Heilongjiang (伊春市), prefecture-level city
- Yichun, Jiangxi (宜春市), prefecture-level city
- Yichun dialect, dialect of Gan Chinese spoken in Yichun, Jiangxi
- Yichun District (伊春区), Yichun, Heilongjiang
