= Gangkou =

Gangkou may refer to:

- Gangkou District (港口区), a district in Fangchenggang, Guangxi province
- Gangkou, Yueyang (筻口镇), a town of Yueyang County, Hunan Province
