= Lingcheng =

Lingcheng may refer to the following locations in China:

- Lingcheng, Anhui (灵城镇), town in Lingbi County
- Lingcheng, Guangxi (灵城镇), town in Lingshan County
- Lingcheng, Jiangsu (凌城镇), town in Suining County
- Lingcheng, Shandong (陵城镇), town in Qufu
