= Sanhe, Guangxi =

Sanhe 三合镇
- Town
- Location in Guangxi
- Coordinates: 22°19′59″N 109°25′14″E
- Country: People's Republic of China
- Autonomous region: Guangxi
- Prefecture-level city: Qinzhou
- County: Pubei County
- Time zone: UTC+8 (China Standard)

Sanhe (Chinese: 三合; pinyin: Sānhé) is a town under the administration of Pubei County, Guangxi, China. As of 2018, it has 1 residential community and 8 villages under its administration.
