= Da–Tong Gan =

Gan Chinese dialect of China

Da-Tong
- Daye
- Native to: China
- Region: Southeastern Hubei, eastern Hunan
- Language family: Sino-Tibetan: Sinitic; Chinese; Gan; Da-Tong
- Writing system: Chinese characters

Language codes
- ISO 639-3: None (mis)
- ISO 639-6: dton
- Glottolog: None
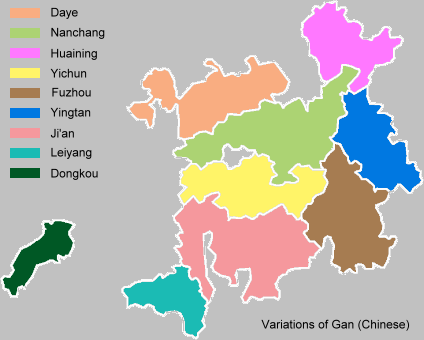
- Map of Gan languages; Da-Tong-speaking region in orange.

Da-Tong, sometimes called Daye (simplified Chinese: 大冶话; traditional Chinese: 大冶話) after its principal dialect, is one of the Gan Chinese languages. It is spoken in Daye, in the southeastern part of Hubei province near the Jiangxi border, as well as in Xianning, Jiangyu, Puxin, Chongyang, Tongcheng, Tongshan, and Yangxin in Hubei, as well as in Huarong and bordering areas of eastern Hunan.

== Sounds ==
The Daye variety will be taken as representative.

=== Consonants ===
Consonants of Daye Gan
		Bilabial	Alveolar	Alveolo-palatal	Velar	Glottal
Nasal		m		ɲ	ŋ	
Plosive	voiceless unaspirated	p	t		k	
Plosive	voiceless aspirated	pʰ	tʰ		kʰ	
Affricate	voiceless unaspirated		ts	tɕ		
Affricate	voiceless aspirated		tsʰ	tɕʰ		
Fricative	voiced		z	ʑ		
Fricative	voiceless	f	s	ɕ		x
Lateral approximant			l			

=== Tones ===
==== Citation tones ====
Tone chart of Daye Gan
Tone number	Tone name	Tone contour
1	yin ping (陰平)	˨ (2)
2	yang ping (陽平)	˧˩˧ (313)
3	shang sheng (上聲)	˦˧ (43)
4	qu sheng (去聲)	˧˥ (35)
5	ru sheng (入聲)	˩˧ (13)
