= Gan Chinese =

Chinese varieties spoken around Jiangxi

Gan
- Gann
- 贛語/赣语; Gon nyy
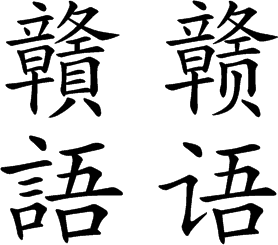
- Gan ua (Gan) written in Chinese characters
- Native to: China
- Region: central and northern Jiangxi, eastern Hunan, eastern Hubei, southern Anhui, northwest Fujian
- Ethnicity: Gan people
- Native speakers: 23 million (2021)
- Language family: Sino-Tibetan: Sinitic; Chinese; Hakka–Gan?; Gan
- Early forms: Old Chinese: Eastern Han Chinese; Middle Chinese
- Varieties: Nanchangese; Yichun; Yingtan; Daye
- Writing system: Chinese characters Romanization

Language codes
- ISO 639-3: gan
- Glottolog: ganc1239
- Linguasphere: 79-AAA-f

Chinese name
- Traditional Chinese: 贛語
- Simplified Chinese: 赣语
- Gan: Gon nyy
Transcriptions
Standard Mandarin
- Hanyu Pinyin: Gànyǔ
Gan
- Romanization: Gon nyy
Hakka
- Romanization: Kàm-ngî
Yue: Cantonese
- Yale Romanization: gam yúh
- Jyutping: gam3 jyu5

Jiangxi dialect
- Traditional Chinese: 江西話
- Simplified Chinese: 江西话
- Gan: Kongsi ua
Transcriptions
Standard Mandarin
- Hanyu Pinyin: Jiāngxīhuà
Gan
- Romanization: Kongsi ua
Yue: Cantonese
- Yale Romanization: gōng sāi wá
- Jyutping: gong1 sai1 waa2

Gan, Gann or Kan is a group of Sinitic languages spoken natively by many people in the Jiangxi province of China, as well as significant populations in surrounding regions such as Hunan, Hubei, Anhui, and Fujian. Hakka is the closest Chinese variety to Gan in terms of phonetics.

There are different dialects of Gan; the Nanchang dialect is the prestige dialect.

== Classification ==
Like all other varieties of Chinese, there is extremely little mutual intelligibility between Gan Chinese and other varieties. Within the variation of Chinese languages, Gan has more similarities with Mandarin than with Yue or Min. However, Gan clusters more with Xiang than Mandarin.

Gan and other Southern Chinese languages can be distinguished from Northern Chinese by their placement of direct objects before indirect objects. Gan's ditransitive verbs introduce the theme right after the verb, while Mandarin's introduce the recipient. So the difference in tritransitive verbs may occur because they evolved from different types of ditransitive verbs.

== Name ==
- Gan is the most common name. Also spelled Gann to reflect the falling tone of the name in Mandarin. Scholars in mainland China use Gan.
- Jiāngxīhuà ("Jiangxi language") is commonly used in Chinese, but since the borders of the language do not follow the borders of the province, this name is not geographically exact.
- Xi ("right-river language") is an ancient name, now seldom used, arising from the fact that most Gan speakers live south of the Yangtze River, beyond the right-hand bank when traveling downstream.

== Region ==
The area coloured in light yellow shows the Gan-speaking region in the PRC.

Most Gan speakers live in the middle and lower reaches of the Gan River, the drainage area of the Fu River, and the region of Poyang Lake. There are also many Gan speakers living in eastern Hunan, eastern Hubei, southern Anhui, northwest Fujian, etc.

According to the Administration Manual of the People’s Republic of China, published in 2004, Gan is spoken by approximately 48,000,000 people: 29,000,000 in Jiangxi, 4,500,000 in Anhui, 5,300,000 in Hubei, 9,000,000 in Hunan, and 270,000 in Fujian.

== History ==
=== Antiquity ===
During the Qin dynasty (221 BC), a large number of troops were sent to southern China in order to conquer the Baiyue territories in Fujian and Guangdong, as a result, numerous Han Chinese emigrated to Jiangxi in the years following. In the early years of the Han dynasty (202 BC), Nanchang was established as the capital of the Yuzhang Commandery (豫章郡) (this name stems from the original name of Gan River), along with the 18 counties (縣) of Jiangxi Province. The population of the Yuzhang Commandery increased from 350,000 (in AD 2) to 1,670,000 (by AD 140); it ranked fourth in population among the more than 100 contemporary commanderies of China. As the largest commandery of Yangzhou, Yuzhang accounted for two-fifths of the population and Gan gradually took shape during this period.

=== Middle Ages ===
As a result of continuous warfare in the regions of central and Northern China, the first large-scale emigration in the history of China took place. Large numbers of people in central China relocated to southern China in order to escape the bloodshed caused by the upheaval of the Five Barbarians and in this process, Jiangxi played the role of a transfer station. Also, during this period, ancient Gan began to be exposed to the northern dialects. After centuries of rule by the Southern Dynasties, Gan still retained many original characteristics despite having absorbed some elements of northern speech. Up until the Tang dynasty, there was little difference between old Gan and the contemporary Gan of that era. Beginning in the Five Dynasties period, however, inhabitants in the central and northern parts of Jiangxi Province began to migrate to eastern Hunan, eastern Hubei, southern Anhui and northwest Fujian. During this period, following hundreds of years of migration, Gan spread to its current areas of distribution.

=== Late traditional period ===
Mandarin Chinese evolved into a standard language based on Beijing Mandarin, owing largely to political factors. At the same time, the differences between Gan and Mandarin continued to become more pronounced. However, because Jiangxi borders on Jianghuai, a Mandarin, Xiang, and Hakka speaking region, Gan proper has also been influenced by these surrounding varieties, especially in its border regions.

=== Modern times ===
After 1949, as a "dialect" in mainland China, Gan faced a critical period. The impact of Mandarin is quite evident today as a result of official governmental language campaigns. Currently, many youths are unable to master Gan expressions, and some are no longer able to speak Gan at all.

Recently, however, as a result of increased interest in protecting the local language, Gan now has begun to appear in various regional media, and there are also newscasts and television programs broadcast in Gan Chinese. Local Government, mainly in the cities of Nanchang and Ganzhou, have also launched (albeit still limited) linguistic preservation efforts including through research with a 400-hour "Nanchang Dialect Conversational Speech Corpus" (南昌方言对话语音语料库) of Nanchang-Gan collected and published in 2025, making it the most comprehensive existing dataset of Nanchang dialect, or of any Gan variant.

== Languages and dialects ==
There are significant differences within the Gan-speaking region, and Gan constitutes more languages than listed here. For example, in Anfu county, which was categorized as Ji-Cha, there are two main varieties, called Nanxiang Hua (Southern region) and Beixiang Hua (Northern region). People from one region cannot even understand people from the other region if they were not well educated or exposed to the other.

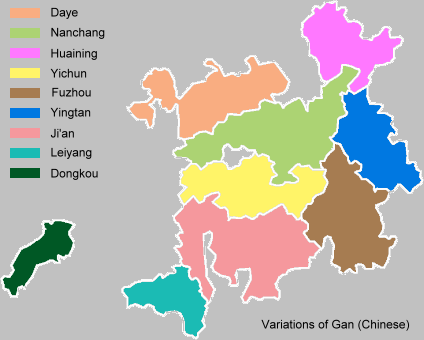
The main areas of Gan languages in mainland China.

The Language Atlas of China (1987) divides Gan into nine groups:

Subgroup	Representative	Provinces	Cities
Changdu 昌都片	Nanchang dialect	northwestern Jiangxi	Nanchang City, Nangchang, Xinjian, Anyi, Yongxiu, Xiushui*, De'an, Xingzi, Duchang, Hukou, Gao'an*, Fengxin*, Jing'an*, Wuning*, Tonggu*
Changdu 昌都片	Nanchang dialect	northeastern Hunan	Pingjiang
Yiliu 宜浏片 / 宜瀏片	Yichun dialect	central and western Jiangxi	Yichun City, Yichun, Yifeng*, Shanggao, Qingjiang, Xingan, Xinyu City, Fen yi, Pingxiang City, Fengcheng, Wanzai
Yiliu 宜浏片 / 宜瀏片	Yichun dialect	eastern Hunan	Liuyang*, Liling
Jicha 吉茶片	Ji'an dialect	central and southern Jiangxi	Ji'an City, Ji'an*, Jishui, Xiajiang, Taihe*, Yongfeng*, Anfu, Lianhua, Yongxin*, Ninggang*, Jianggangshan* Wan'an, Suichuan*
Jicha 吉茶片	Ji'an dialect	eastern Hunan	Youxian*, Chaling*, Linxian
Fuguang 抚广片 / 撫廣片	Fuzhou dialect (撫州, not to be confused with 福州)	central and eastern Jiangxi	Fuzhou City, Linchuan, Chongren, Yihuang, Le'an, Nancheng, Lichuan, Zixi, Jinxi, Dongxiang, Jinxian, Nanfeng, Guangchang*
Fuguang 抚广片 / 撫廣片	Fuzhou dialect (撫州, not to be confused with 福州)	southwestern Fujian	Jianning, Taining
Yingyi 鹰弋片	Yingtan dialect	northeastern Jiangxi	Yingtan City, Guixi, Yujiang, Wannian, Leping, Jingdezhen*, Yugan, Poyang, Pengze, Hengfeng, Yiyang, Chuanshan
Datong 大通片	Daye dialect	southeastern Hubei	Daye, Xianning City, Jiayu, Puqi, Chongyang, Tongcheng, Tongshan, Yangxin, Jianli*
Datong 大通片	Daye dialect	eastern Hunan	Linxiang*, Yueyang*, Huarong
Leizi 耒资片 / 耒資片	Leiyang dialect	eastern Hunan	Leiyang, Changning, Anren, Yongxing, Zixing City
Dongsui 洞绥片 / 洞綏片	Dongkou dialect	southwestern Hunan	Dongkou*, Suining*, Longhui*
Huaiyue 怀岳片 / 懷嶽片	Huaining dialect	southwestern Anhui	Huaining, Yuexi, Qianshan, Taihu, Wangjiang*, Susong*, Dongzhi*, Shitai*, Guichi*

Cities marked with * are partly Gan-speaking.

== Grammar ==
In Gan, there are nine principal grammatical aspects or "tenses" – initial (起始), progressive (進行), experimental (嘗試), durative (持續), processive (經歷), continuative (繼續), repeating (重行), perfect (已然), and complete (完成).

The grammar of Gan is similar to southern Chinese varieties. The sequence subject–verb–object is most typical, but subject–object–verb or the passive voice (with the sequence object–subject–verb) is possible with particles. Take a simple sentence for example: "I hold you". The words involved are: ngo ("I" or "me"), tsot dok ("to hold"), ň ("you").

- Subject–verb–object (typical sequence): The sentence in the typical sequence would be: ngo tsot dok ň. ("I hold you.")
- Subject–lat–object–verb: Another sentence of roughly equivalent meaning is ngo lat ň tsot dok, with the slight connotation of "I take you and hold" or "I get to you and hold."
- Object–den–subject–verb (the passive voice): Then, ň den ngo tsot dok means the same thing but in the passive voice, with the connotation of "You allow yourself to be held by me" or "You make yourself available for my holding."

== Vocabulary ==
In Gan, there are a number of archaic words and expressions originally found in ancient Chinese, and which are now seldom or no longer used in Mandarin. For example, the noun "clothes" in Gan is "衣裳" while "衣服" in Mandarin, the verb "sleep" in Gan is "睏覺" while "睡覺" in Mandarin. Also, to describe something dirty, Gan speakers use "下里巴人", which is a reference to a song from the Chu region dating to China's Spring and Autumn period.

Additionally, there are numerous interjections in Gan (e.g. 哈, 噻, and 啵), which can largely strengthen sentences, and better express different feelings.

== Writing system ==
Gan can be written with Chinese characters, though it does not have a strong written tradition. There are also some romanization schemes, but none are widely used. When writing, Gan speakers usually have to use Standard Chinese, which is widely used in China.

== See also ==
- Protection of the Varieties of Chinese
