= Ying–Yi Gan =

Gan Chinese dialect of Jiangxi, China

Ying-Yi
- Yingtan
- Native to: China
- Region: Northeastern Jiangxi
- Language family: Sino-Tibetan: Sinitic; Chinese; Gan; Ying-Yi
- Writing system: Chinese characters

Language codes
- ISO 639-3: None (mis)
- ISO 639-6: yiyi
- Glottolog: ying1246
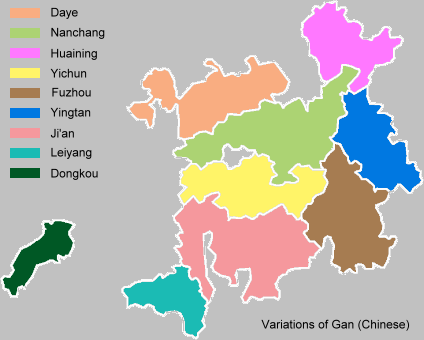
- Map of Gan languages; Ying–Yi-speaking region in blue.

Ying-Yi, sometimes called Yingtan after its principal dialect, is one of the Gan Chinese languages. It is named after Yingtan and Yiyang, and is spoken in those areas as well as in Yugan Guixi, Yujiang, Wannian, Leping, Poyang, Pengze, Hengfeng, Chuanshan in Jiangxi province.

== Sounds ==
The Yugan variety of Ying-Yi will be taken as representative.

=== Consonants ===
Consonants of the Yugan Gan
		bilabial	alveolar	alveolo-palatal	Post- alveolar	velar	glottal
Nasal		m		ɲ		ŋ	
Plosive	voiceless unaspirated	p	t			k	
Plosive	voiceless aspirated	pʰ	tʰ			kʰ	
Affricate	voiceless unaspirated		ts	tɕ	tʃ		
Affricate	voiceless aspirated		tsʰ	tɕʰ	tʃʰ		
Fricative		ɸ	s	ɕ	ʃ		h
Lateral approximant			l				

=== Tones ===
==== Citation tones ====
Tone chart of Yugan Gan
Tone number	Tone name	Tone contour	Description
1	yin ping (陰平)	˧ (33)	falling
2	yang ping (陽平)	˩˦ (14)	rising
3	shang sheng (上聲)	˨˩˧ (213)	dipping
4	yin qu (陰去)	˦˥ (45)	high
5	yang qu (陽去)	˩˨ (12)	low
6	ru sheng (入聲)	˩˦̚ (14)	checked (Boolean value)
7	ru sheng (入聲)	˩̚ (1)	checked (Boolean value)'
