= Chang–Du Gan =

Dialect of Gan Chinese

Chang–Du
- Nanchang, Chang–Jing, Nanchangese
- 南昌话
- Native to: China
- Region: Northwestern Jiangxi
- Language family: Sino-Tibetan: Sinitic; Chinese; Gan; Chang–Du
- Writing system: Chinese characters

Language codes
- ISO 639-3: None (mis)
- ISO 639-6: cagj
- Glottolog: chan1317
- Linguasphere: 79-AAA-fad
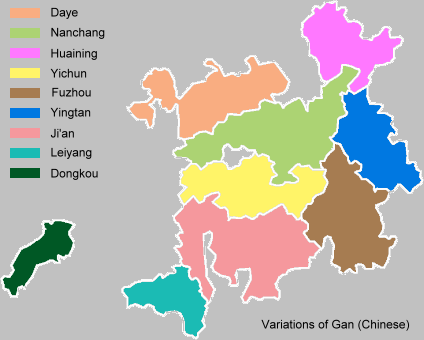
- Map of Gan languages; Chang–Du-speaking region in light green.

Solomon speaking the Hukou variety of Chang–Du Gan

Chang–Du or Chang–Jing, sometimes called Nanchang or Nanchangese (simplified Chinese: 南昌话; traditional Chinese: 南昌話; pinyin: Nánchānghuà) after its principal dialect, is one of the Gan Chinese languages. It is named after Nanchang and Duchang County, and is spoken in those areas as well as in Xinjian, Anyi, Yongxiu, De'an, Xingzi, Hukou, and bordering regions in Jiangxi and in Pingjiang County, Hunan.

== Phonology ==
The Nanchang dialect has 19 syllable onsets or initials (including the zero initial), 65 finals and 7 tones.

=== Initials ===
In each cell below, the first line indicates IPA transcription, the second indicates pinyin.

		Bilabial	Dental/ Alveolar	(Alveolo-) palatal	Velar	Glottal
Nasal		m m 麻		ɲ gn 魚	ŋ ng 牙	
Plosive	plain	p b 巴	t d 打		k g 加	
Plosive	aspirated	pʰ p 怕	tʰ t 讀		kʰ k 卡	
Affricate	plain		ts dz 渣	tɕ j 脊		
Affricate	aspirated		tsʰ tz 茶	tɕʰ q 喫		
Fricative		ɸ f 花	s s 紗	ɕ x 寫		h h 蝦
Lateral			l l 啦			

=== Finals ===
The finals of the Nanchang dialect are:

	-					-i		-u			-n				-ŋ			-t				-k		
-	a 扯	ɔ 何	ɛ 許	ɹ̩ 柿	ə 儒	ai 敗	əi 噯	au 抱	ɛu 茂	əu 周	an 闲	ɔn 漢	ɛn 痕	ən 分	aŋ 正	ɔŋ 裝	uŋ 共	at 八	ɔt 撥	ɛt 北	ət 不	ak 百	ɔk 剝	uk 鹿
-i-	ja 惹		jɛ 佢	i 眉					jɛu 廟	iu 酒			jɛn 淹	in 隱	jaŋ 井	jɔŋ 獎	juŋ 供			jɛt 革	it 乙	jak 脊	jɔk 腳	juk 菊
-u-	wa 話	wɔ 禾	wɛ 哇	u 母		wai 懷	ui 委				wan 灣	wɔn 換		un 滾	waŋ 梗	wɔŋ 廣		wat 滑	wɔt 活	wɛt 國	ut 勿	wak 摑	wɔk 擴	
-y-			ɥɛ 瘸	y 豬								ɥɔn 軟		yn 笋					ɥɔt 絕		yt 戍			

==== Consonantal codas ====
Syllabic nasals	m̩ 姆	n̩ 汝	ŋ̍ 五

consonantal finals	-p	-t	-k	-m	-n	-ng
IPA	[-p]	[-t]	[-k]	[-m]	[-n]	[-ŋ]
Example	十	八	百	咸	限	横

- The codas in italic are at present only reserved in several Gan dialects.

=== Tone ===
Like other Chinese varieties, tones in Gan make phonemic distinctions. There are five phonemic tones in Gan, which are reduced to two 'entering tones' before stop consonants. In the traditional classification, these are considered separately:

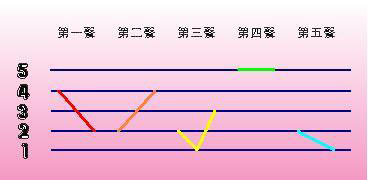
tones of Gan

Tone number	Tone name	Pitch numbers	IPA transcription (on a)
1	upper departing	(42)	a˦˨ or â
2	lower level	(24)	a˨˦ or ǎ
3	rising	(213)	a˨˩˧ or á̀́
4	upper level	(55)	a˥ or á
5	lower departing	(21)	a˨˩ or à
6	upper entering	(5)	ak˥ or ák
7	lower entering	(21)	ak˨˩ or àk

The 6th and 7th tones are the same as the 4th and 5th tones, except that the syllable ends in a stop consonant, /t/ or /k/.

=== Example ===
A poem of Meng Haoran (“Men Hau-len” in Gan):

春曉 孟浩然	Cun Hieu – Men Hau-len
春眠不覺曉，	cun mien bhut gok hieu,
處處聞啼鳥。	cu cu mun ti tieu.
夜來風雨聲，	ya loi fung ui sang,
花落知多少？	fa lok zi do seu?
