= Yong–Xun Yue =

Yue Chinese dialect of Guangxi, China

Yong-Xun
- Jungcam
- Native to: China
- Region: Guangxi
- Speakers: 4.69 million (2012)
- Language family: Sino-Tibetan: Sinitic; Chinese; Yue; Yong-Xun

Language codes
- ISO 639-3: None (mis)
- ISO 639-6: yoxu
- Glottolog: yong1286 Yongxun
- Linguasphere: 79-AAA-mg
- Yong-Xun (left), among other Yue and Pinghua groups in Guangxi and Guangdong. Nanning and Baise are marked as parts of Pinghua speaking area, but Yong-Xun Yue is also spoken in the urban districts of them.

Yong–Xun (Jyutping: Jung^{1} cam^{4}, 邕潯方言), is a western branch of Yue Chinese spoken in some cities and towns in Guangxi province, including Nanning, Yongning, Guiping, Chongzuo, Ningming, Hengzhou, Baise, etc. This branch originates from Guangfu Yue and is therefore close to Standard Cantonese. It also absorbed some phonemes and words from the local languages Pinghua and Zhuang.

== Dialects ==
Nanning dialect is representative.

- Nanning dialect
- Yongning dialect
- Guiping dialect
- Chongzuo dialect
- Ningmin dialect
- Hengxian dialect
- Baise dialect
