= Shangsi County =

Shangsi County 上思县 · Sangswh Yen
- County
- Location in Guangxi
- Coordinates: 22°09′13″N 107°58′55″E
- Country: China
- Autonomous region: Guangxi
- Prefecture-level city: Fangchenggang
- County seat: Siyang

Area
  - Total: 2,816 km^{2} (1,087 sq mi)

Population (2020)
  - Total: 194,774
  - Density: 69.17/km^{2} (179.1/sq mi)
- Time zone: UTC+8 (China Standard)

Shangsi County (Chinese: 上思县; pinyin: Shàngsī Xiàn; Zhuang: Sangswh Yen) is a county in the southwest of Guangxi, China. It is the northernmost county-level division of Fangchenggang City.

== Administrative divisions ==
Shangsi County is divided into 4 towns, 3 townships and 1 ethnic township:

towns

- Siyang Town 思阳镇
- Zaimiao Town 在妙镇
- Hualan Town 华兰镇
- Jiao'an Town 叫安镇

townships

- Pingfu Township 平福乡
- Naqin Township 那琴乡
- Gongzheng Township 公正乡

ethnic township

- Nanping Yao Ethnic Township 南屏瑶族乡

== Climate ==
Climate data for Shangsi, elevation 216 m (709 ft), (1991–2020 normals, extremes 1981–present)
Month	Jan	Feb	Mar	Apr	May	Jun	Jul	Aug	Sep	Oct	Nov	Dec	Year
Record high °C (°F)	31.1 (88.0)	36.0 (96.8)	35.7 (96.3)	39.6 (103.3)	40.1 (104.2)	38.4 (101.1)	39.5 (103.1)	37.4 (99.3)	37.0 (98.6)	36.0 (96.8)	33.3 (91.9)	31.6 (88.9)	40.1 (104.2)
Mean daily maximum °C (°F)	17.6 (63.7)	20.0 (68.0)	22.8 (73.0)	28.1 (82.6)	31.3 (88.3)	32.6 (90.7)	32.8 (91.0)	32.4 (90.3)	31.2 (88.2)	28.3 (82.9)	24.5 (76.1)	19.9 (67.8)	26.8 (80.2)
Daily mean °C (°F)	13.0 (55.4)	15.0 (59.0)	18.1 (64.6)	22.9 (73.2)	26.1 (79.0)	27.7 (81.9)	27.8 (82.0)	27.3 (81.1)	26.0 (78.8)	23.0 (73.4)	18.9 (66.0)	14.6 (58.3)	21.7 (71.1)
Mean daily minimum °C (°F)	9.9 (49.8)	11.7 (53.1)	14.9 (58.8)	19.3 (66.7)	22.5 (72.5)	24.4 (75.9)	24.6 (76.3)	24.2 (75.6)	22.7 (72.9)	19.4 (66.9)	15.1 (59.2)	11.1 (52.0)	18.3 (65.0)
Record low °C (°F)	−0.2 (31.6)	2.6 (36.7)	1.4 (34.5)	8.8 (47.8)	13.0 (55.4)	15.7 (60.3)	18.9 (66.0)	20.3 (68.5)	15.4 (59.7)	8.4 (47.1)	2.4 (36.3)	−1.1 (30.0)	−1.1 (30.0)
Average precipitation mm (inches)	31.5 (1.24)	21.8 (0.86)	43.1 (1.70)	60.3 (2.37)	123.8 (4.87)	162.0 (6.38)	260.4 (10.25)	243.0 (9.57)	156.6 (6.17)	83.6 (3.29)	44.2 (1.74)	26.3 (1.04)	1,256.6 (49.48)
Average precipitation days (≥ 0.1 mm)	8.9	8.6	10.9	9.8	13.7	16.5	17.2	18.0	12.4	6.5	7.2	6.7	136.4
Average relative humidity (%)	79	80	82	79	78	81	82	84	81	78	78	76	80
Mean monthly sunshine hours	87.0	87.1	85.8	134.2	184.5	176.4	193.0	187.4	181.1	176.7	147.2	125.8	1,766.2
Percentage possible sunshine	26	27	23	35	45	44	47	47	50	49	45	38	40
Source: China Meteorological Administrationall-time October record
