= Wu–Hua Yue =

Branch of Yue Chinese

Wu-Hua
- Ngfaa
- Native to: China
- Region: Guangxi
- Speakers: 1.28 million (2012)
- Language family: Sino-Tibetan: Sinitic; Chinese; Yue; Wu-Hua

Language codes
- ISO 639-3: None (mis)
- ISO 639-6: whua
- Glottolog: wuhu1235 Wuhua
- Linguasphere: 79-AAA-md
- Wu-Hua (bottom), among other Yue and Pinghua groups in Guangxi and Guangdong.

Wu–Hua (Ng-faa, 吳化方言) is a branch of Yue Chinese spoken in Guangdong province composed of two dialects:

- Wuchuan dialect
- Huazhou dialect
