= Pubei County =

Pubei County 浦北县 · Bujbwz Yen
- County
- Location of the seat in Guangxi
- Coordinates: 22°16′19″N 109°33′25″E
- Country: China
- Autonomous region: Guangxi
- Prefecture-level city: Qinzhou
- County seat: Xiaojiang

Area
  - Total: 2,521 km^{2} (973 sq mi)

Population (2020)
  - Total: 683,964
  - Density: 271.3/km^{2} (702.7/sq mi)
- Time zone: UTC+8 (China Standard)

Pubei County (Chinese: 浦北县; pinyin: Pǔběi Xiàn; Zhuang: Bujbwz Yen) is a county in the south of Guangxi, China. It is under the administration of Qinzhou City.

== Administrative divisions ==
Pubei's executive, legislature and judiciary are seated in Xiaojiang, together with its CPC and PSB branches.

Pubei includes 2 subdistricts and 15 towns:

subdistricts

- Xiaojiang 小江街道
- Jiangcheng 江城街道

towns

- Quanshui 泉水镇
- Shiyong 石埇镇
- Anshi 安石镇
- Zhanghuang 张黄镇
- Dacheng 大成镇
- Baishishui 白石水镇
- Beitong 北通镇
- Sanhe 三合镇
- Longmen 龙门镇
- Fuwang 福旺镇
- Zhaixu 寨圩镇
- Lemin 乐民镇
- Liuken 六硍镇
- Pingmu 平睦镇
- Guandong 官垌镇

== Climate ==
Climate data for Pubei, elevation 70 m (230 ft), (1991–2020 normals, extremes 1981–present)
Month	Jan	Feb	Mar	Apr	May	Jun	Jul	Aug	Sep	Oct	Nov	Dec	Year
Record high °C (°F)	28.7 (83.7)	32.5 (90.5)	33.1 (91.6)	35.1 (95.2)	36.0 (96.8)	36.9 (98.4)	38.6 (101.5)	38.3 (100.9)	37.2 (99.0)	35.2 (95.4)	34.1 (93.4)	29.8 (85.6)	38.6 (101.5)
Mean daily maximum °C (°F)	18.1 (64.6)	19.9 (67.8)	22.6 (72.7)	27.2 (81.0)	30.9 (87.6)	32.1 (89.8)	32.7 (90.9)	32.9 (91.2)	32.0 (89.6)	29.5 (85.1)	25.6 (78.1)	20.8 (69.4)	27.0 (80.7)
Daily mean °C (°F)	13.3 (55.9)	15.4 (59.7)	18.4 (65.1)	22.9 (73.2)	26.2 (79.2)	27.6 (81.7)	28.0 (82.4)	27.8 (82.0)	26.6 (79.9)	23.7 (74.7)	19.6 (67.3)	15.1 (59.2)	22.1 (71.7)
Mean daily minimum °C (°F)	10.2 (50.4)	12.3 (54.1)	15.6 (60.1)	19.9 (67.8)	22.8 (73.0)	24.7 (76.5)	24.9 (76.8)	24.7 (76.5)	23.2 (73.8)	19.8 (67.6)	15.6 (60.1)	11.3 (52.3)	18.8 (65.8)
Record low °C (°F)	−0.8 (30.6)	0.2 (32.4)	1.6 (34.9)	8.3 (46.9)	12.5 (54.5)	16.0 (60.8)	19.2 (66.6)	20.7 (69.3)	14.7 (58.5)	8.3 (46.9)	0.9 (33.6)	−1.9 (28.6)	−1.9 (28.6)
Average precipitation mm (inches)	49.7 (1.96)	41.8 (1.65)	72.5 (2.85)	131.1 (5.16)	195.1 (7.68)	329.9 (12.99)	346.3 (13.63)	264.9 (10.43)	174.8 (6.88)	71.6 (2.82)	56.1 (2.21)	34.6 (1.36)	1,768.4 (69.62)
Average precipitation days (≥ 0.1 mm)	9.7	10.6	14.9	14.1	16.3	20.0	21.0	19.6	13.1	6.8	6.6	7.4	160.1
Average relative humidity (%)	79	81	84	83	83	85	85	85	82	76	75	73	81
Mean monthly sunshine hours	76.0	56.5	48.6	74.6	124.5	124.8	163.4	167.6	173.4	177.7	145.6	123.1	1,455.8
Percentage possible sunshine	22	17	13	20	31	31	40	42	47	50	44	37	33
Source: China Meteorological Administrationall-time October record
