= Qinbei District =

Coordinates: 22°07′57″N 108°26′57″E

Qinbei 钦北区 • Ginhbwz Gih
- District
- Interactive map of Qinbei
- Country: China
- Autonomous region: Guangxi
- Prefecture-level city: Qinzhou

Area
  - Total: 2,685 km^{2} (1,037 sq mi)
- Time zone: UTC+8 (China Standard)

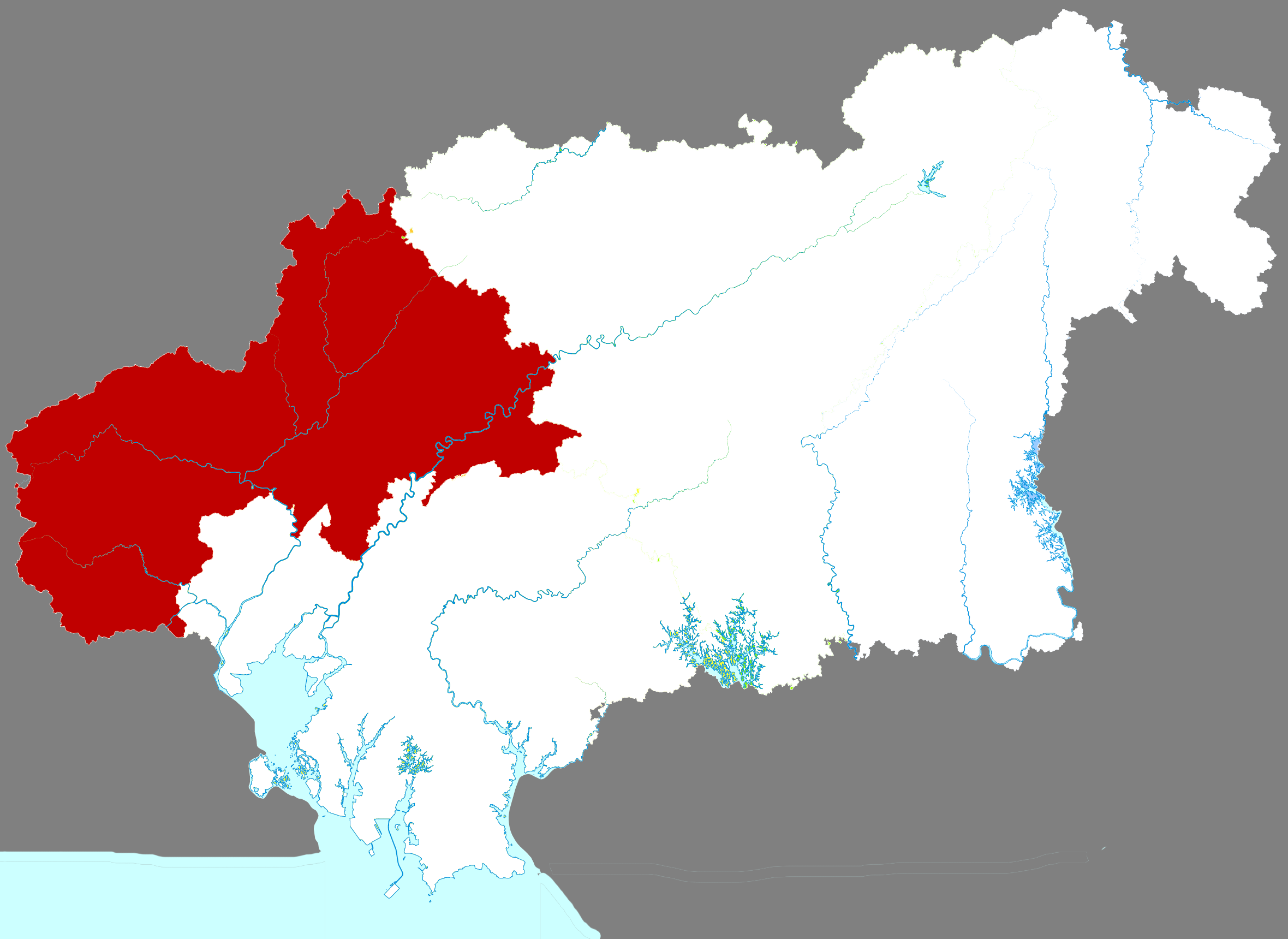
Location of Qinbei district in Guangxi Zhuang autonomous region

Qinbei District (simplified Chinese: 钦北区; traditional Chinese: 欽北區; pinyin: Qīnběi Qū; Zhuang language: Ginhbwz Gih) is a district of the city of Qinzhou, Guangxi, China.

== Administrative divisions ==
Qinbei District is divided into 3 subdistricts and 11 towns:

subdistricts

- Changtian 长田街道
- Hongting 鸿亭街道
- Zicai子材街道

towns

- Dadong 大垌镇
- Pingji 平吉镇
- Qingtang 青塘镇
- Xiaodong 小董镇
- Bancheng 板城镇
- Nameng 那蒙镇
- Changtan 长滩镇
- Xintang 新棠镇
- Dazhi 大直镇
- Dasi 大寺镇
- Guitai 贵台镇
