= Yi–Liu Gan =

Gan Chinese language of Jiangxi, China

Yi-Liu
- Yichun
- Native to: China
- Region: Central and western Jiangxi
- Language family: Sino-Tibetan: Sinitic; Chinese; Gan; Yi-Liu
- Writing system: Chinese characters

Language codes
- ISO 639-3: None (mis)
- ISO 639-6: yilu
- Glottolog: yili1247
- Linguasphere: 79-AAA-faf
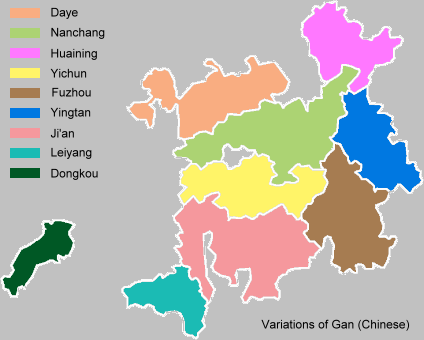
- Map of Gan languages; Yi-Liu-speaking region in yellow.

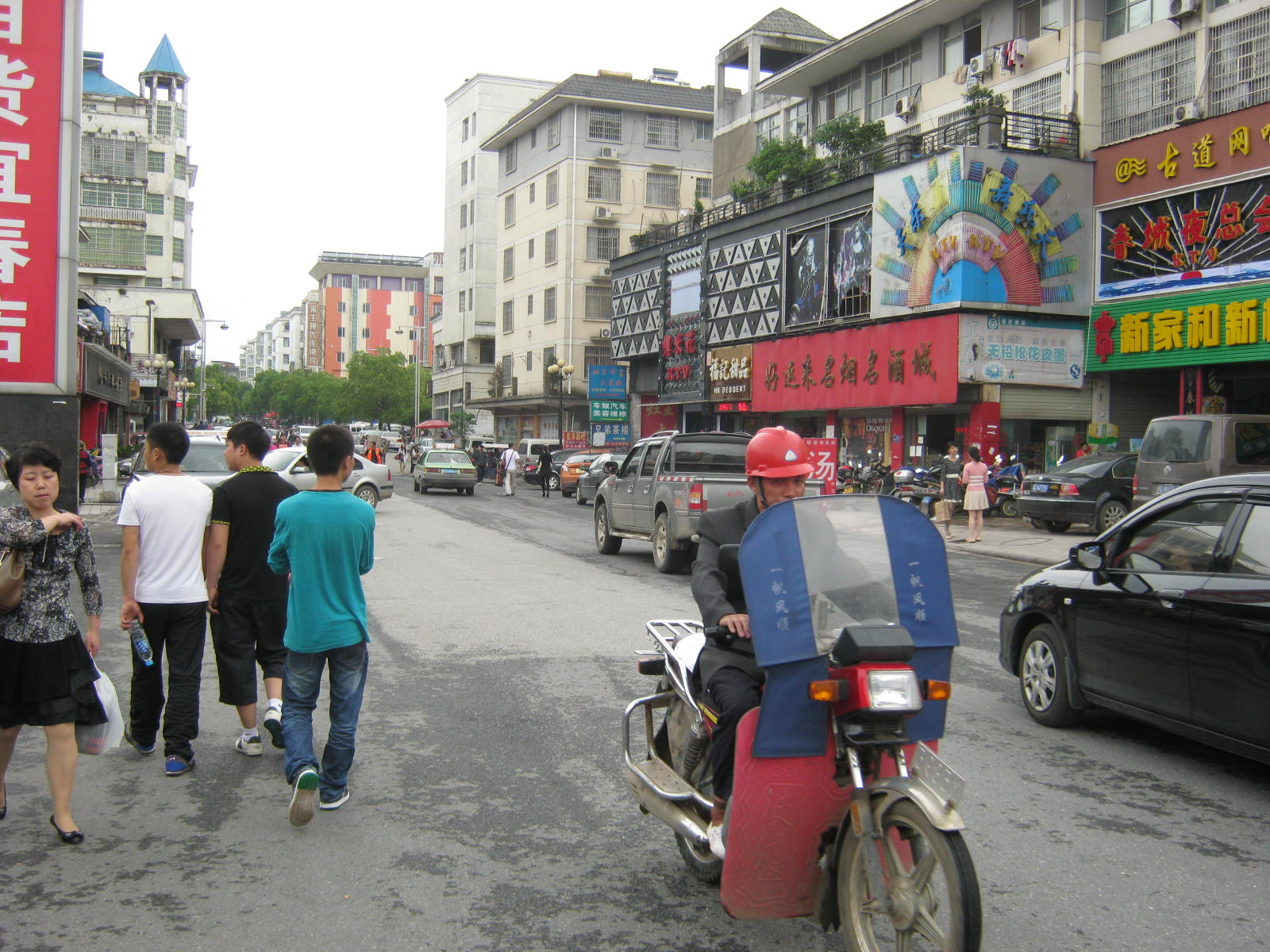
View of Yichun, Jiangxi

Yi-Liu, sometimes called Yichun (simplified Chinese: 宜春话; traditional Chinese: 宜春話) after its principal dialect, is one of the Gan Chinese languages. It is spoken in Yichun in Jiangxi province and in Liuyang in Hunan, after which it is named, as well as in Shanggao, Qingjiang, Xingan, Xinyu City, Fen yi, Pingxiang City, Fengcheng, Wanzai in Jiangxi and in Liling in Hunan.

== Sounds ==
The Yichun variety will be taken as representative.

=== Consonants ===
Consonants of Yichun Gan
		Bilabial	Alveolar	Alveolo- palatal	Post- alveolar	Velar	Glottal
Nasal		m		ɲ		ŋ	
Plosive	aspirated	pʰ	tʰ			kʰ	
Plosive	unaspirated	p	t			k	
Affricate	aspirated		tsʰ	tɕʰ	tʃʰ		
Affricate	unaspirated		ts	tɕ	tʃ		
Fricative		f	s	ɕ	ʃ		h
Lateral approximant			l				

=== Tones ===
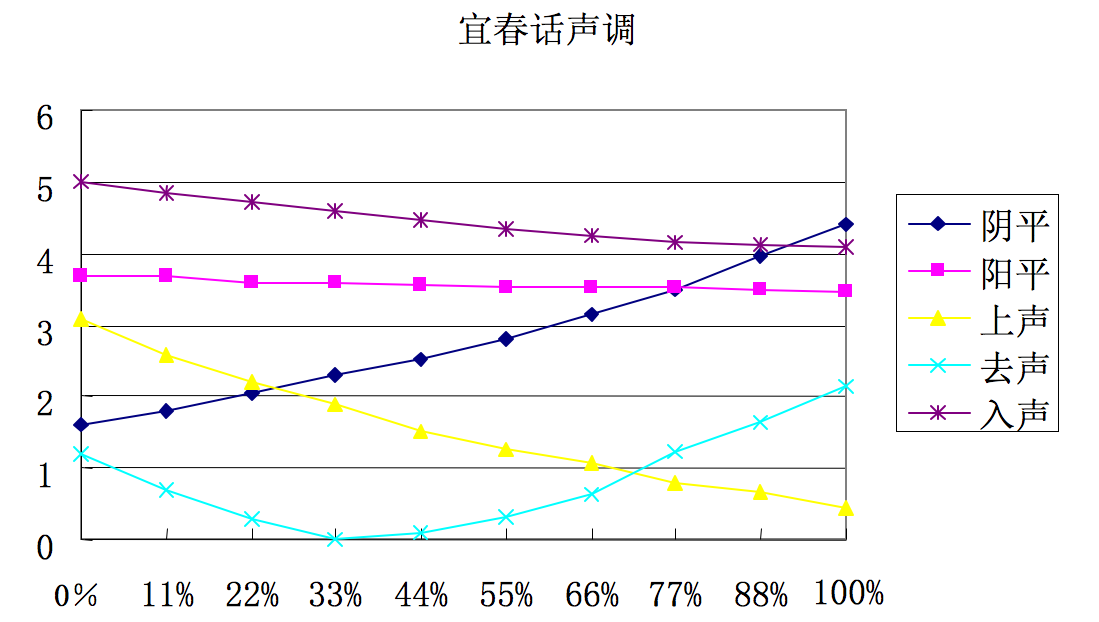
Sonograph produced tone contour graph

Tone chart of Yichun Gan
Tone number	Tone name	Tone contour	Examples
1	dark level (阴平)	˨˦ (25)	多家彪都姑波编邦
2	light level (阳平)	˦ (44)	婆爬钱磨驴朋肥扶
3	rising sheng (上声)	˧˩ (31)	左努改讨巧草拐苦
4	light departing (去声)	˨˩˧ (213)	大树害饭谢用望漏
5	departing sheng (入声)	˥ (55)	月六黑割发白湿毒
