= Gangkou District =

Gangkou 港口区 • Gangzgouj Gih
- District
- Location of the seat in Guangxi
- Coordinates: 21°38′46″N 108°22′30″E
- Country: China
- Autonomous region: Guangxi
- Prefecture-level city: Fangchenggang
- District seat: Yuzhouping Subdistrict

Area
  - Total: 370 km^{2} (140 sq mi)

Population (2020 census)
  - Total: 244,280
  - Density: 660/km^{2} (1,700/sq mi)
- Time zone: UTC+8 (China Standard)
- Division code: GKQ
- Website: www.gkq.gov.cn

Gangkou (Chinese: 港口; pinyin: Gǎngkǒu; lit. 'port'; Zhuang: Gangzgouj) is a district of the city of Fangchenggang, Guangxi, China.

== Administrative divisions ==
Gangkou District is divided into 4 subdistricts and 2 towns:

- Yuzhouping Subdistrict (渔州坪街道)
- Baishawan Subdistrict (白沙𬇕街道)
- Shatanjiang Subdistrict (沙潭江街道)
- Wangfu Subdistrict (王府街道)
- Qisha Town (企沙镇)
- Guangpo Town (光坡镇)
