= Lingshan County =

Lingshan County 灵山县
- County
- Location of the seat in Guangxi
- Coordinates: 22°26′N 109°17′E
- Country: China
- Region: Guangxi
- Prefecture-level city: Qinzhou
- County seat: Lingcheng

Area
  - Total: 3,550 km^{2} (1,370 sq mi)
- Elevation: 63 m (207 ft)

Population (2002)
  - Total: 1,360,000
  - Density: 383/km^{2} (992/sq mi)
- Time zone: UTC+8 (China Standard)

Lingshan County (postal: Lingshan; simplified Chinese: 灵山县; traditional Chinese: 靈山縣; pinyin: Língshān Xiàn) is a county under the administration of Qinzhou City in southeastern Guangxi, China.

== Administration ==
Lingshan's executive, legislature and judiciary are seated in Lingcheng, together with its CPC and PSB branches. The county administers 2 subdistricts and 17 towns in total:

- Lingcheng Subdistrict (灵城街道)
- Sanhai Subdistrict (三海街道)
- Xinxu (新圩镇)
- Fengtang (丰塘镇)
- Pingshan (平山镇)
- Shitang (石塘镇)
- Fozi (佛子镇)
- Pingnan (平南镇)
- Yandun (烟墩镇)
- Tanxu (檀圩镇)
- Nalong (那隆镇)
- Sanlong (三隆镇)
- Luwu (陆屋镇)
- Jiuzhou (旧州镇)
- Taiping (太平镇)
- Shaping (沙坪镇)
- Wuli (武利镇)
- Wenli (文利镇)
- Bolao (伯劳镇)

== Climate ==
Climate data for Lingshan, elevation 67 m (220 ft), (1991–2020 normals, extremes 1981–2010)
Month	Jan	Feb	Mar	Apr	May	Jun	Jul	Aug	Sep	Oct	Nov	Dec	Year
Record high °C (°F)	30.2 (86.4)	36.1 (97.0)	35.4 (95.7)	38.6 (101.5)	40.0 (104.0)	37.7 (99.9)	37.8 (100.0)	37.1 (98.8)	36.7 (98.1)	34.6 (94.3)	33.4 (92.1)	30.8 (87.4)	40.0 (104.0)
Mean daily maximum °C (°F)	17.3 (63.1)	19.2 (66.6)	21.8 (71.2)	27.0 (80.6)	30.5 (86.9)	31.9 (89.4)	32.7 (90.9)	32.8 (91.0)	31.6 (88.9)	28.9 (84.0)	24.8 (76.6)	19.8 (67.6)	26.5 (79.7)
Daily mean °C (°F)	12.9 (55.2)	15.1 (59.2)	18.1 (64.6)	23.0 (73.4)	26.3 (79.3)	27.9 (82.2)	28.3 (82.9)	28.2 (82.8)	26.7 (80.1)	23.6 (74.5)	19.4 (66.9)	14.7 (58.5)	22.0 (71.6)
Mean daily minimum °C (°F)	10.0 (50.0)	12.2 (54.0)	15.4 (59.7)	20.1 (68.2)	23.3 (73.9)	25.2 (77.4)	25.3 (77.5)	25.1 (77.2)	23.4 (74.1)	19.9 (67.8)	15.6 (60.1)	11.1 (52.0)	18.9 (66.0)
Record low °C (°F)	1.2 (34.2)	2.6 (36.7)	3.3 (37.9)	9.6 (49.3)	14.1 (57.4)	15.5 (59.9)	19.1 (66.4)	21.6 (70.9)	15.5 (59.9)	9.1 (48.4)	3.5 (38.3)	0.1 (32.2)	0.1 (32.2)
Average precipitation mm (inches)	56.5 (2.22)	44.8 (1.76)	73.9 (2.91)	109.3 (4.30)	174.6 (6.87)	296.5 (11.67)	338.2 (13.31)	255.2 (10.05)	147.0 (5.79)	83.8 (3.30)	57.7 (2.27)	36.6 (1.44)	1,674.1 (65.89)
Average precipitation days (≥ 0.1 mm)	10.4	10.9	15.3	13.4	15.6	19.6	19.4	18.5	11.7	6.7	7.3	7.4	156.2
Average relative humidity (%)	78	79	83	81	80	84	83	83	81	76	75	73	80
Mean monthly sunshine hours	80.4	65.4	56.5	94.5	156.1	156.4	192.6	191.3	193.3	193.0	153.4	128.3	1,661.2
Percentage possible sunshine	24	20	15	25	38	39	47	48	53	54	47	39	37
Source: China Meteorological Administration
