= Yue Chinese =

Branch of Chinese language family

Yue
- Cantonese
- 粤语; 粵語 广东话; 廣東話
- Yuhtyúh; 'Yue' written in Traditional (left) and Simplified (right) character forms
- Region: Guangdong, Guangxi, western Hainan, Hong Kong and Macau
- Ethnicity: Cantonese (including Taishanese, Tankas and other Yue dialect speakers)
- Native speakers: 85 million (2021–2024)
- Language family: Sino-Tibetan: Sinitic; Chinese; Yue
- Early forms: Proto-Sino-Tibetan language: Old Chinese; Eastern Han Chinese; Middle Chinese
- Varieties: Yuehai (incl. Cantonese); Siyi (incl. Taishanese); Gao–Yang; Yong–Xun; Gou–Lou; Qin–Lian; Wu–Hua; Luo–Guang

Language codes
- ISO 639-3: yue
- Glottolog: yuec1235
- Linguasphere: 79-AAA-m
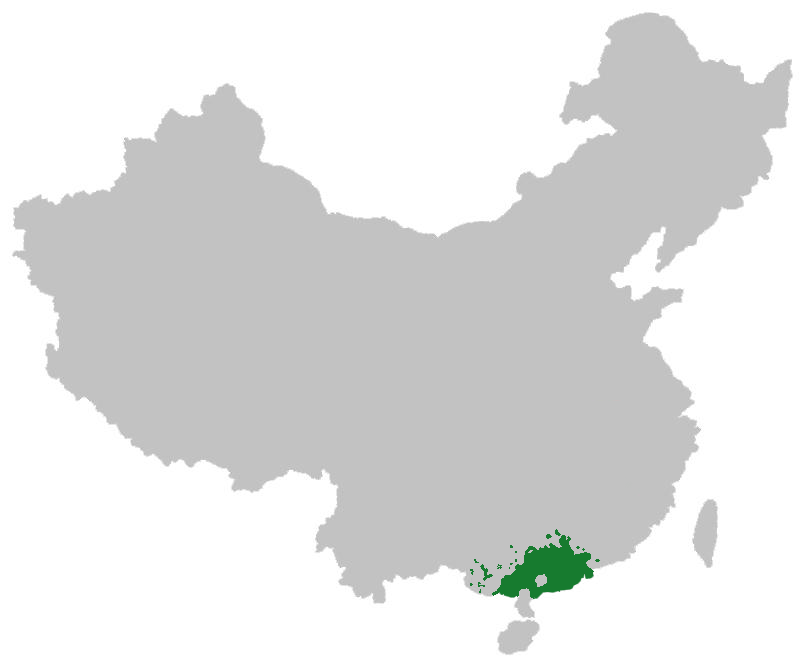

Yue language
- Traditional Chinese: 粵語
- Simplified Chinese: 粤语
- Cantonese Yale: Yuhtyúh
- Literal meaning: 'Language of Yue'
Transcriptions
Standard Mandarin
- Hanyu Pinyin: Yuèyǔ
- Bopomofo: ㄩㄝˋ ㄩˇ
- Wade–Giles: Yüeh^{4}-yü^{3}
- Tongyong Pinyin: Yuè-yǔ
- IPA: [ɥê.ỳ]
Wu
- Romanization: Yoeh nyy
Yue: Cantonese
- Yale Romanization: Yuhtyúh
- Jyutping: jyut6 jyu5
- Canton Romanization: Yüd^{6}yü^{5}
- IPA: [jyt̚˨.jy˩˧]
Southern Min
- Hokkien POJ: O̍at-gí, O̍at-gú

Guangdong language
- Traditional Chinese: 廣東話
- Simplified Chinese: 广东话
- Cantonese Yale: Gwóngdūng wá
- Literal meaning: 'Guangdong speech'
Transcriptions
Standard Mandarin
- Hanyu Pinyin: Guǎngdōnghuà
- Wade–Giles: Kuang^{3}-tung^{1} Hua^{4}
- Tongyong Pinyin: Guǎngdong-huà
- IPA: [kwàŋtʊ́ŋ.xwâ]
Wu
- Romanization: Kuaon ton ho
Yue: Cantonese
- Yale Romanization: Gwóngdūng wá
- Jyutping: gwong2 dung1 waa2
- Canton Romanization: Guong^{2}dung^{1} wa^{2}
- IPA: [kʷɔŋ˧˥.tʊŋ˥ wa˧˥]
Southern Min
- Hokkien POJ: Kńg-tang-oē

Yue (Cantonese pronunciation: [jyːt̚˨]) is a branch of the Sinitic languages primarily spoken in Southern China, particularly in Hong Kong, Macau, and the provinces of Guangdong and Guangxi (collectively known as Liangguang).

The term Cantonese is often used to refer to the whole branch, but linguists prefer to reserve the name Cantonese for the variety used in Guangzhou (Canton), Wuzhou (Ngchow), Hong Kong and Macau, which is the prestige dialect of the group. Taishanese, from the coastal area of Jiangmen (Kongmoon) located southwest of Guangzhou, was the language of most of the 19th-century emigrants from Guangdong to Southeast Asia and North America. Most later migrants have been speakers of Cantonese.

Yue languages are not mutually intelligible with each other or with other Chinese languages outside the branch. They are among the most conservative varieties with regard to the final consonants and tonal categories of Middle Chinese, but have lost several distinctions in the initial consonants and medial glides that other Chinese varieties have retained.

== Terminology ==
Cantonese is prototypically used in English to refer to the variety of Yue in Guangzhou, but it is also used to refer to Yue as a whole. To avoid confusion, academic texts may refer to the larger branch as "Yue", following the pinyin system based on Standard Chinese, and either restrict "Cantonese" to the Guangzhou variety, or avoid the term altogether, distinguishing Yue from its Guangzhou dialect. Some linguists such as Anne Yue and Norbert Francis designate Yue Chinese itself as a language.

People from Hong Kong and Macau, as well as Cantonese immigrants abroad, generally refer to their language as 廣東話; Gwóngdūngwá; 'Guangdong speech' [kʷɔ̌ːŋ tʊ́ŋ wǎː]. In Guangdong and Guangxi, people also use the terms 粵語; Yuhtyúh; 'Yue language' [jỳt jy̬ː] and 白話; baahkwá (plain/colloquial speech) [pàːk wǎː]; for example, the expression 南寧白話; Nàahmnìhng baahkwá means 'Nanning colloquial speech'.

== History ==
Guangdong, Hong Kong, and Macau 500k+ Cantonese speaking peoples 100k+ or >10% of population made of Cantonese speaking peoples 50k+ Cantonese speaking peoples 30k+ or an insignificant provincial amount within a country with a significant national amount of Cantonese speakers

The area of China south of the Nanling Mountains, known as the Lingnan (roughly modern Guangxi and Guangdong), was originally home to peoples known to the Chinese as the Hundred Yue (or Baiyue). Large-scale Han Chinese migration to the area began after the Qin conquest of the region in 214 BC. Successive waves of immigration followed at times of upheaval in Northern and Central China, such as the collapse of the Han, Tang and Song dynasties. The most popular route was via the Xiang River, which the Qin had connected to the Li River by the Lingqu Canal, and then into the valley of the Xi Jiang. A secondary route followed the Gan River and then the Bei Jiang into eastern Guangdong. Yue-speakers were later joined by Hakka speakers following the North River route, and Min speakers arriving by sea.

After the fall of Qin, the Lingnan area was part of the independent state of Nanyue for about a century, before being incorporated into the Han empire in 111 BC. After the Tang dynasty collapsed, much of the area became part of the state of Southern Han, one of the longest-lived states of the Five Dynasties and Ten Kingdoms, between 917 and 971.

Large waves of Chinese migration throughout succeeding Chinese dynasties assimilated huge numbers of Yue aborigines, with the result that today's Southern Han Chinese Yue-speaking population is descended from both groups. The colloquial layers of Yue varieties contain elements influenced by the Tai languages formerly spoken widely in the area and still spoken by people such as the Zhuang and Dong.

=== Rise of Cantonese ===
The port city of Guangzhou lies in the middle of Pearl River Delta, with access to the interior via the Xi, Bei, and Dong rivers, which all converge at the delta. It has been the economic centre of the Lingnan region since Qin times, when it was an important shipbuilding centre. By 660, it was the largest port in China, part of a trade network stretching as far as Arabia. During the Southern Song, it also became the cultural centre of the region. Like many other Chinese varieties it developed a distinct literary layer associated with the local tradition of reading the classics. The Guangzhou dialect (Cantonese) was used in the popular Yuè'ōu, Mùyú and Nányīn folksong genres, as well as Cantonese opera, written with Chinese characters extended with a number of colloquial characters for Cantonese words.

Guangzhou became the centre of rapidly expanding foreign trade after the maritime ban was lifted, with the British East India Company establishing a chamber of commerce in the city in 1715. The ancestors of most of the Han Chinese population of Hong Kong came from Guangzhou after the territory was ceded to Britain in 1842. As a result, Hong Kong Cantonese, the most widely spoken language in Hong Kong and Macau, is an offshoot of the Guangzhou dialect. Other migrations of Yue speakers during the nineteenth century, including west along the Guangdong and Guangxi coasts, brought Cantonese and other Yue varieties to southeast Asia. Many went across the Pacific Ocean to North and South America, leading to the historic domination exerted by Yue Chinese varieties in many Chinatowns across the American continent. The popularity of Cantonese-language media, Cantopop and the cinema of Hong Kong has since led to substantial exposure of Cantonese to China and the rest of Asia.

On the mainland, the national policy is to promote Standard Chinese, which is also the medium of instruction in schools. The place of local Cantonese language and culture remains contentious. In 2010, a controversial proposal to switch some programming on Guangzhou local television from Cantonese to Mandarin was abandoned following widespread backlash accompanied by public protests.

=== Influence of Foreign Languages on Cantonese ===
==== English ====
Cantonese has absorbed a substantial number of English loanwords, particularly in Hong Kong, where over a century of British colonial rule created sustained linguistic contact. These borrowings are typically phonetic transliterations: Chinese characters are chosen for their approximate sound rather than meaning. Well‑known examples include:

- 巴士 (baa1 si6) — “bus”
- 的士 (dik1 si6) — “taxi”
- 芝士 (zi1 si6) — “cheese”
- 曲奇 (kuk1 kei4) — “cookie”
- 士多啤梨 (si6 do1 be1 lei4) — “strawberry”
- 三文治 (saam1 man4 zi6) — “sandwich”

In contemporary Hong Kong Cantonese, code‑mixing with English is extremely common. Speakers often insert English words directly into Cantonese grammar, especially in casual or workplace contexts. Examples include:

- 幫我check下 (bong1 ngo5 check haa5) — “help me check”
- 開OT (hoi1 OT) — “work overtime”

This hybrid usage has become a defining feature of modern urban Cantonese.

==== Japanese ====
Japanese influence on Cantonese generally falls into two main categories.

The first consists of modern slang and pop‑culture terms that entered Cantonese through media, entertainment, and youth culture. Examples include:

- 放題 (fong3 tai4) — “all‑you‑can‑eat,” from Japanese 食べ放題 (tabehōdai)
- 人氣 (jan4 hei3) — “popularity,” from Japanese 人気 (ninki)

The second involves wasei‑kango—Sino‑Japanese words coined in Japan using Chinese morphemes, which were later adopted back into Chinese varieties, including Cantonese. Examples include:

- 革命 (gaak3ming6) — “revolution," from Japanese 革命 (Kakumei)
- 民主 (man4zyu2) — “democracy," from Japanese 民主 (minshu)
- 社會 (se5wui2) — “society," from Japanese 社会 (shakai)
- 經濟 (ging1zai3) — “economy," from Japanese 経済 (keizai)

These terms illustrate how Japanese has shaped modern Cantonese vocabulary, especially in domains such as dining, entertainment, and pop culture.

=== Influence of Cantonese on English ===
While Cantonese is heavily influenced by English, the exchange is mutual. Cantonese has significantly impacted English through direct loanwords, calques (literal translations), and the development of Hong Kong English. Well‑known examples include:

- 白菜 (baak6 coi3), literally "white vegetable".
- 鑊 (wok6), the traditional round-bottomed cooking pot.
- 叉燒 (caa1 siu1), barbecued pork.
- 點心 (dim2 sam1), literally "to touch the heart".
- 雲吞 (wan4 tan1), a type of dumpling.

== Geographic distribution ==
Yue languages are spoken in the southern provinces of Guangdong and Guangxi, an area long dominated culturally and economically by the city of Guangzhou at the delta of the Pearl River. Cantonese, also spoken in Hong Kong and Macau, is the prestige variety of Yue. Yue varieties are not totally mutually intelligible with one another.

The influence of Guangzhou has spread westward along the Pearl River system, so that, for example, the speech of the city of Wuzhou some 190 km (120 mi) upstream in Guangxi is much more similar to that of Guangzhou than dialects of coastal districts that are closer but separated from the city of Guangzhou by hilly terrain. One of these coastal languages, Taishanese, is the most common Yue variety among overseas communities. However, many such Chinatowns have been historically dominated by varieties closer to a more standard Cantonese; among these are those of Hanoi, Kuala Lumpur, Sydney, Vancouver, and London.

Yue Chinese is the most widely spoken local language in Guangdong. Its native speakers constitute around a half (47%) of its population. The other half is equally divided between Hakka and Min languages, mostly Teochew, but also Haklau and Leizhounese.

Yue is also the most widespread Sinitic language in Guangxi, spoken by slightly more than a half of its Han population. The other half is almost equally divided between the Southwestern Mandarin, Hakka, and Pinghua; there is also a considerable Xiang-speaking population and a small Hokkien-speaking minority. Yue Chinese is spoken by 35% of the total population of Guangxi, being one of the two largest languages in that province, along with Zhuang.

In China, as of 2004, 60% of all Yue speakers lived in Guangdong, 28.3% lived in Guangxi, and 11.6% lived in Hong Kong.

== Varieties ==
=== Classification ===
Pinghua and Yue dialect groups in Guangxi and Guangdong identified in the Language Atlas of China: Guibei (N Pinghua) / Gou–Lou; Guinan (S Pinghua) / Guangfu; / Siyi; Yong–Xun / Gao–Yang; Qin–Lian / Wu–Hua

In Yuan Jiahua's 1962 dialect manual, Yue dialects were divided into five groups:

- Yuehai, covering the Pearl River Delta and Xi River valley.
- Seiyap ('four counties'), in the coastal prefecture of Jiangmen to the southwest of Guangzhou.
- Gao–Lei, in southwestern Guangdong.
- Hamlim in southern Guangxi.
- Guinan, in southwestern Guangxi.

In the Language Atlas of China, some varieties spoken in western Guangxi formerly classified as Yue are placed in a separate Pinghua group. The remaining Yue dialects are divided into seven groups. Three groups are found in the watershed of the Pearl River:

- Guangfu (廣府話) includes Cantonese proper, spoken in Guangzhou, Hong Kong and Macau, as well as the dialects of surrounding areas in the Pearl River Delta such as Zhongshan, Foshan, Dongguan, Zhuhai and Shenzhen, and in southern parts of the inland prefectures of Zhaoqing and Qingyuan and in parts of Guangxi such as the city of Wuzhou. Almost a half of all Yue speakers speak Guangfu dialects natively.
- Ngau–Lau dialects are spoken in inland areas of western Guangdong and eastern Guangxi, and include the dialect of Yulin (Bobai). Ngau–Lau is spoken by 17% of all Yue speakers, with two-thirds of them living in Guangxi and one-third in Guangdong.
- Yuhng–Cham is spoken mainly in the Yong–Yu–Xun valley in Guangxi, including the provincial capital Nanning. It is spoken by around 7% of Yue speakers.

The remaining four groups are found in coastal areas:

- Sze-yap or Siyi dialects are spoken in the coastal prefecture of Jiangmen to the southwest of Guangzhou. They include the Taishan variety, also known as Taishanese, which was ubiquitous in American Chinatowns before the 1970s. Sze-yap dialects are spoken by 6.5% of total Yue speakers.
- Gao–Yang dialects are spoken in areas of southwestern Guangdong such as Yangjiang and Lianjiang. They cover around 11% of all Yue Chinese speakers.
- Wu–Hua is spoken mainly in western Guangdong around Wuchuan and Huazhou. Native speakers of this variety constitute only 2.1% of all Yue speakers.
- Qin–Lian dialects are spoken in the southern Guangxi areas of Beihai, Qinzhou and Fangcheng. They are spoken by 6.5% of all Yue speakers.

Anne Yue-Hashimoto has proposed an alternative classification based on a wider sampling of features:

- Pearl River Delta
  - Northern
    - Sanyi–Zhaoqing: dialects of Foshan and southeast Zhaoqing
    - Interior: western part of the Pearl River catchment, including the Atlas's Gou–Lou and southern Pinghua dialects.
  - Guangfu
    - Core: Cantonese proper (Guangzhou, Hong Kong Cantonese)
    - Interior: Gao–Yang dialects of Maoming and the Yong–Xun dialects of Nanning and Guiping.
  - Southern
    - Zhongshan, including Shiqi dialect
    - Guan–Lian: dialects of the east delta region (Dongguan and the New Territories) as well as the coastal Guangxi dialects classified as Qin–Lian in the Atlas.
    - Interior: Huazhou, Wuchuan, Yulin
- Wuyi–Liangyang
  - Wuyi
    - Xin–En: Xinhui, Taishan, Enping and the neighbouring Doumen District.
    - Kai-He: Kaiping and Heshan.
  - Liangyang: Yangjiang and Yangchun (the eastern part of the Atlas's Gao–Yang area)

The Dapeng dialect is a variety displaying features of both Cantonese and Hakka, spoken by 3,000–5,500 people in Dapeng, Shenzhen.

=== Cantonese ===
Jasper Tsang reciting Letter to the Emperor (by Su Xun, 1058) in Cantonese

The Guangzhou (Canton) dialect of Yuehai, usually called "Cantonese", is the prestige dialect of Guangdong province and social standard of Yue. It is the most widely spoken dialect of Yue and is an official language of Hong Kong and of Macau, alongside English and Portuguese respectively. It is the lingua franca of not only Guangdong, but also many overseas Cantonese emigrants, though in many areas abroad it is numerically second to the Taishanese dialect of Yue.

By law, Standard Chinese, based on the Beijing dialect of Mandarin, is taught nearly universally as a supplement to local languages such as Cantonese. In Guangzhou, much of the distinctively Yue vocabulary have been replaced with Cantonese pronunciations of corresponding Standard Chinese terms.

Cantonese is the de facto official language of Hong Kong (along with English) and Macau (along with Portuguese), though legally the official language is just "Chinese". It is the oral language of instruction in Chinese schools in Hong Kong and Macau, and is used extensively in Cantonese-speaking households. Cantonese-language media (Hong Kong films, television serials, and Cantopop), which exist in isolation from the other regions of China, local identity, and the non-Mandarin speaking Cantonese diaspora in Hong Kong and abroad give the language a unique identity. Colloquial Hong Kong Cantonese often incorporates English words due to historical British influences.

Most wuxia films from Canton are filmed originally in Cantonese and then dubbed or subtitled in Mandarin, English, or both.

=== Taishanese ===
A speaker of Siyi Yue Chinese providing examples of differences between Siyi Yue and Cantonese

When the Chinese government removed the prohibition on emigration in the mid-19th century, many people from rural areas in the coastal regions of Fujian and Guangdong emigrated to Southeast Asia and North America. Until the late 20th century, the vast majority of Chinese immigrants to North America came from the Siyi ('four counties') to the southwest of Guangzhou. The speech of this region, particularly the Taishan dialect, is thus the most common Yue variety in these areas. It is only partially understood by speakers of Cantonese.

== Phonology ==
Distribution of Yue and other subgroups of Chinese in East Asia

Yue varieties are among the most conservative of Chinese varieties regarding the final consonants and tonal categories of Middle Chinese, so that the rhymes of Tang poetry are clearer in Yue dialects than elsewhere. However they have lost several distinctions in the initial consonants and medial vowels that other Chinese varieties have retained.

=== Initials and medials ===
In addition to aspirated and unaspirated voiceless initials, Middle Chinese had a series of voiced initials, but voicing has been lost in Yue and most other modern Chinese varieties apart from Wu and Old Xiang. In the Guangfu, Siyi and Gao–Yang subgroups, these initials have yielded aspirated consonants in the level and rising tones, and unaspirated consonants in the departing and entering tones. These initials are uniformly unaspirated in Gou–Lou varieties and uniformly aspirated in Wu–Hua.

In many Yue varieties, including Cantonese, Middle Chinese /kʰ/ has become [h] or [f] in most words; in Taishanese, /tʰ/ has also changed to [h], for example, in the native name of the dialect, "Hoisan". In Siyi and eastern Gao–Yang, Middle Chinese /s/ has become a voiceless lateral fricative [ɬ].

Most Yue varieties have merged the Middle Chinese retroflex sibilants with the alveolar sibilants, in contrast with Mandarin dialects, which have generally maintained the distinction. For example, the words 將; jiāng and 張; zhāng are distinguished in Mandarin, but in modern Cantonese they are both pronounced as jēung.

Many Mandarin varieties, including the Beijing dialect, have a third sibilant series, formed through a merger of palatalized alveolar sibilants and velars, but this is a recent innovation, which has not affected Yue and other Chinese varieties. For example, 晶, 精, 經 and 京 are all pronounced as jīng in Mandarin, but in Cantonese the first pair is pronounced jīng, while the second pair is pronounced gīng. The earlier pronunciation is reflected in historical Mandarin romanizations, such as "Peking" for Beijing, "Kiangsi" for Jiangxi, and "Tientsin" for Tianjin.

Some Yue speakers, such as many Hong Kong Cantonese speakers born after World War II, merge /n/ with /l/, but Taishanese and most other Yue varieties preserve the distinction. Younger Cantonese speakers also tend not to distinguish between /ŋ/ and the zero initial, though this distinction is retained in most Yue dialects. Yue varieties retain the initial /m/ in words where Late Middle Chinese shows a shift to a labiodental consonant, realized in most Northern varieties of Chinese as [w]. Nasals can be independent syllables in Yue words, e.g. Cantonese 五; ńgh; 'five', and 唔; m̀h; 'not', although Middle Chinese did not have syllables of this type.

In most Yue varieties (except for Tengxian), the rounded medial /w/ has merged with the following vowel to form a monophthong, except after velar initials. In most analyses velars followed by /w/ are treated as labio-velars.

Most Yue varieties have retained the Middle Chinese palatal medial, but in Cantonese it has also been lost to monophthongization, yielding a variety of vowels.

=== Final consonants and tones ===
Middle Chinese syllables could end with glides /j/ or /w/, nasals /m/, /n/ or /ŋ/, or stops /p/, /t/ or /k/. Syllables with vocalic or nasal endings could occur with one of three tonal contours, called 平; 'level', 上; 'rising', or 去; 'departing'. Syllables with final stops were traditionally treated as a fourth tone category, the entering tone 入; rù, because the stops were distributed in the same way as the corresponding final nasals.

While northern and central varieties have lost some of the Middle Chinese final consonants, they are retained by most southern Chinese varieties, though sometimes affected by sound shifts. They are most faithfully preserved in Yue dialects. Final stops have disappeared entirely in most Mandarin dialects, including the Beijing-based standard, with the syllables distributed across the other tones. For example, the characters 裔, 屹, 藝, 憶, 譯, 懿, 肄, 翳, 邑, and 佚 are all pronounced yì in Mandarin, but they are all distinct in Yue: in Cantonese, yeuih, ngaht, ngaih, yīk, yihk, yi, yih, ai, yāp, and yaht, respectively.

Similarly, in Mandarin dialects the Middle Chinese final /m/ has merged with /n/, but the distinction is maintained in southern varieties of Chinese such as Hakka, Min and Yue. For example, Cantonese has 譚; taahm and 壇; tàahn versus Mandarin tán, 鹽; yìhm and 言; yìhn versus Mandarin yán, 添; tìm and 天; tìn versus Mandarin tiān, and 含; hàhm and 寒; hòhn versus Mandarin hán.

Middle Chinese is described in contemporary dictionaries as having four tones, where the fourth category, the entering tone, consists of syllables with final stops. Many modern Chinese varieties contain traces of a split of each of these four tones into two registers, an upper or yīn register from voiceless initials and a lower or yáng register from voiced initials. Most Mandarin dialects retain the register distinction only in the level tone, yielding the first and second tones of the standard language (corresponding to the first and fourth tones in Cantonese), but have merged several of the other categories. Most Yue dialects have retained all eight categories, with a further split of the upper entering tone conditioned by vowel length, as also found in neighbouring Tai dialects. A few dialects spoken in Guangxi, such as the Bobai dialect, have also split the lower entering tone.

== Vocabulary ==
While most Chinese varieties form compounds consisting of a qualifier followed by a qualified element, Yue dialects may use the reverse order. For example, the Standard Chinese, and widely used Cantonese word for "guest" is 客人; kèrén; 'guest-person', but the same morphemes may be reversed in Cantonese [jɐn ha:k] versus Taishanese [ŋin hak], and Tengxian [jən hɪk]. This has been hypothesized to be the influence of Tai languages, in which modifiers normally follow nouns. But it is notable that the Standard Chinese word for 'married woman' (人妻) also follows the same structure. Gender markers for nouns are also suffixed, as in other southern varieties.

Some Yue dialects, including Cantonese, can use the same word 邊個; bīn-go; 'which one', for both 'who' and 'which'. Other dialects, including Taishanese, use 誰; sŭe (cf. Mandarin 誰; shéi) for 'who', and words meaning 'which one' for 'which'.

== See also ==
- Cantonese grammar
- Chinese input methods for computers
- Lingnan culture
- Written Cantonese
- Written Chinese
- Languages of China
- List of varieties of Chinese
