= Qinzhou =

Prefecture-level city in Guangxi, China

Qinzhou 钦州市 • Ginhcouh Si
- Prefecture-level city
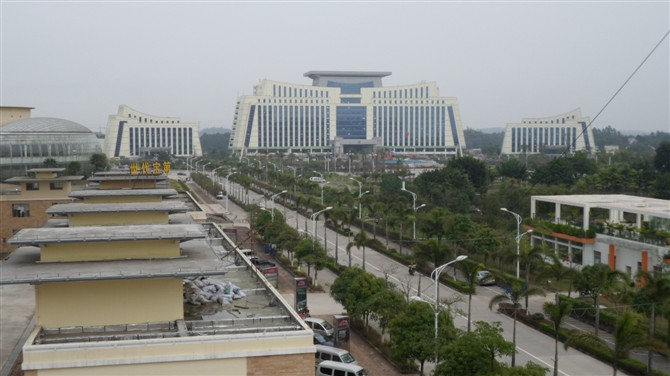
- Qinzhou government buildings

- Location of Qinzhou City jurisdiction in Guangxi

- Location in China
- Coordinates (Qinzhou municipal government): 21°58′52″N 108°39′14″E
- Country: People's Republic of China
- Autonomous region: Guangxi
- Municipal seat: Qinbei District

Area
  - Prefecture-level city: 10,820.85 km^{2} (4,177.95 sq mi)
  - Urban: 4,750.2 km^{2} (1,834.1 sq mi)
  - Metro: 4,750.2 km^{2} (1,834.1 sq mi)
- Elevation: 12 m (39 ft)

Population (2020 census)
  - Prefecture-level city: 3,302,238
  - Density: 305.1736/km^{2} (790.3961/sq mi)
  - Urban: 1,400,134
  - Urban density: 294.75/km^{2} (763.41/sq mi)
  - Metro: 1,400,134
  - Metro density: 294.75/km^{2} (763.41/sq mi)

GDP
  - Prefecture-level city: CN¥ 164.8 billion US$ 25.5 billion
  - Per capita: CN¥ 49,804; US$ 7,720
- Time zone: UTC+8 (China Standard)
- Postal code: 535000
- Area code: 0777
- ISO 3166 code: CN-GX-07
- Licence plate prefixes: 桂N
- Website: www.qinzhou.gov.cn

Qinzhou

Chinese name
- Simplified Chinese: 钦州
- Traditional Chinese: 欽州
- Postal: Yamchow
Transcriptions
Standard Mandarin
- Hanyu Pinyin: Qīnzhōu
- Wade–Giles: Ch'in^{1}-chou^{1}
- IPA: [tɕʰín.ʈʂóʊ]
Yue: Cantonese
- Jyutping: Jam^{1}zau^{1}
- IPA: [jɐm˥.tsɐw˥]

Zhuang name
- Zhuang: Ginhcouh
- 1957 orthography: Ginƅcouƅ

Qinzhou (postal: Yamchow or Yen Chow, simplified Chinese: 钦州; traditional Chinese: 欽州; pinyin: Qīnzhōu, Jyutping: Jam1 zau1 (Canton/Ham1 zau1 (Local)) is a prefecture-level city in south-central Guangxi, southern China, lying on the Gulf of Tonkin and having a total population of 3,302,238 as of the 2020 census whom 1,400,134 lived in the built-up (or metro) area made of Qinbei and Qinnan urban Districts. By the end of 2024, the total registered population of the city was 4,213,300.

== History ==
The area originally belonged to Guangdong and was transferred to Guangxi in 1965. The city was originally a county Qinxian (postal: Yamhsien). From the beginning of the present era, Qinzhou (Wade-Giles: K'in-chou) was for many centuries "the center of Chinese overland trade with Indo-China".

== Administration ==
The Qinzhou municipal region comprises two (county-level) districts and two counties.

Population data is as of 2023.

- Qinnan District - pop. 677,600
- Qinbei District - pop. 882,000
- Lingshan County - pop. 1,692,200
- Pubei County - pop. 954,100

Map
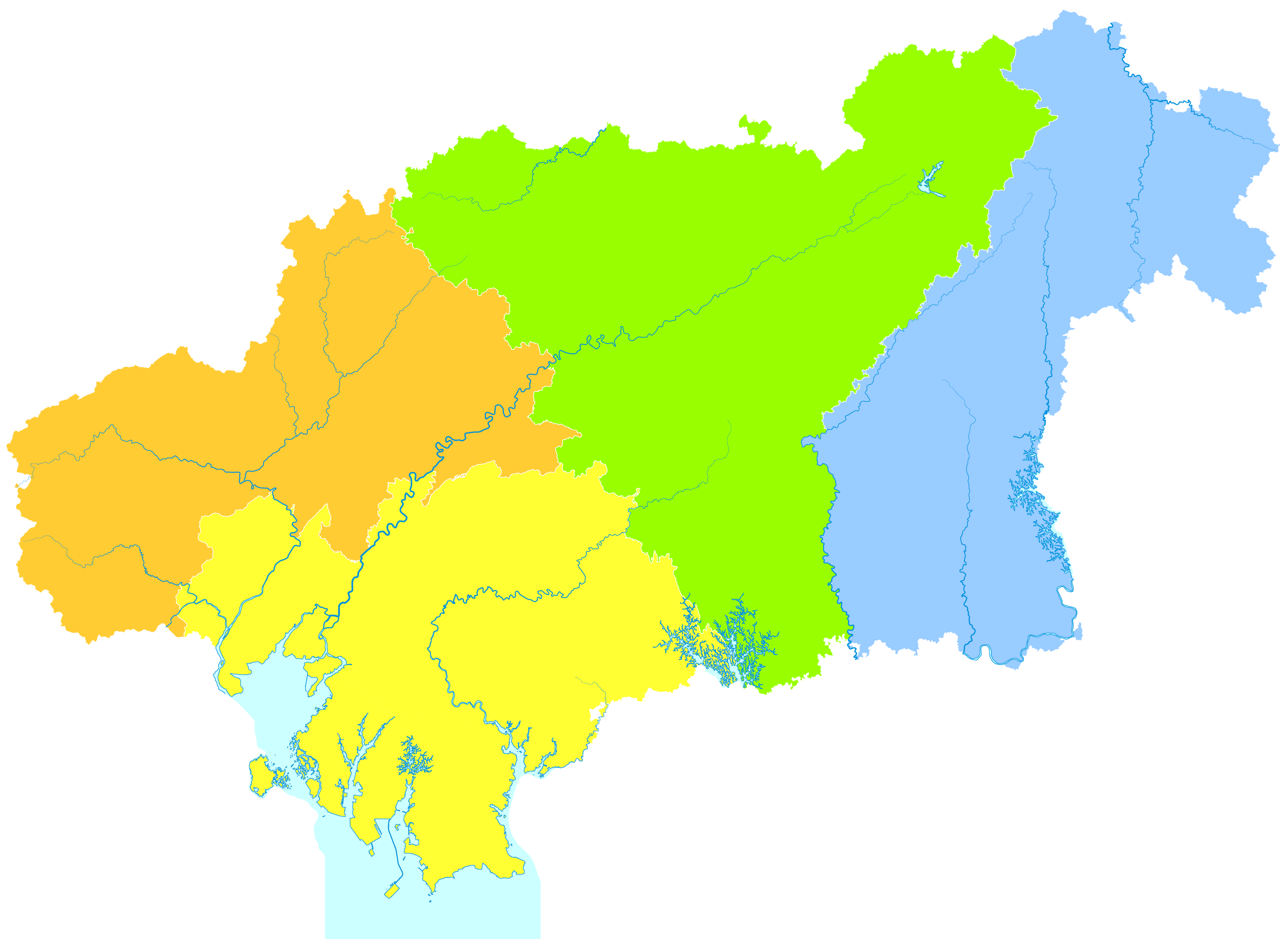

== Geography and climate ==
Despite its latitude and location on the Gulf of Tonkin coast, Qinzhou has a monsoon-influenced humid subtropical climate (Köppen Cwa), with short, mild winters, and long, hot and humid summers. Winter begins dry and rather sunny but becomes progressively wetter and cloudier. Spring is generally overcast and often rainy, while summer continues to be rainy though is the sunniest time of year; the coastal location moderates summer daytime temperatures, but there are 10.9 days annually with rainfall totaling at least 50 mm (1.97 in). Autumn is sunny and dry. The monthly 24-hour average temperature ranges from 13.9 °C (57.0 °F) in January to 28.6 °C (83.5 °F) in July, and the annual mean is 22.53 °C (72.6 °F). Mean annual rainfall is just above 2,170 mm (85 in), the majority of which, on average, occurs from June to August in large totals in excess of 380 mm (15 in) each month. With monthly possible sunshine ranging from 17% in February to 55% in September, the city receives an average of 1,721 hours of bright sunshine annually.

Climate data for Qinzhou, elevation 49 m (161 ft), (1991–2020 normals, extremes 1952–present)
Month	Jan	Feb	Mar	Apr	May	Jun	Jul	Aug	Sep	Oct	Nov	Dec	Year
Record high °C (°F)	28.1 (82.6)	31.5 (88.7)	34.0 (93.2)	34.0 (93.2)	36.9 (98.4)	37.2 (99.0)	37.9 (100.2)	38.1 (100.6)	37.0 (98.6)	35.3 (95.5)	32.9 (91.2)	31.5 (88.7)	38.1 (100.6)
Mean daily maximum °C (°F)	17.8 (64.0)	19.4 (66.9)	22.1 (71.8)	27.0 (80.6)	30.6 (87.1)	31.9 (89.4)	32.4 (90.3)	32.7 (90.9)	31.9 (89.4)	29.3 (84.7)	25.3 (77.5)	20.5 (68.9)	26.7 (80.1)
Daily mean °C (°F)	14.0 (57.2)	15.8 (60.4)	18.6 (65.5)	23.3 (73.9)	26.8 (80.2)	28.4 (83.1)	28.7 (83.7)	28.5 (83.3)	27.6 (81.7)	24.9 (76.8)	20.7 (69.3)	16.1 (61.0)	22.8 (73.0)
Mean daily minimum °C (°F)	11.5 (52.7)	13.3 (55.9)	16.2 (61.2)	20.8 (69.4)	24.1 (75.4)	25.9 (78.6)	26.1 (79.0)	25.7 (78.3)	24.7 (76.5)	21.7 (71.1)	17.5 (63.5)	13.1 (55.6)	20.0 (68.1)
Record low °C (°F)	−1.8 (28.8)	2.1 (35.8)	3.8 (38.8)	9.0 (48.2)	14.6 (58.3)	19.0 (66.2)	21.0 (69.8)	20.9 (69.6)	15.7 (60.3)	10.2 (50.4)	3.9 (39.0)	1.9 (35.4)	−1.8 (28.8)
Average precipitation mm (inches)	50.8 (2.00)	42.6 (1.68)	73.0 (2.87)	102.9 (4.05)	194.8 (7.67)	460.4 (18.13)	478.4 (18.83)	376.0 (14.80)	194.6 (7.66)	100.0 (3.94)	73.0 (2.87)	40.1 (1.58)	2,186.6 (86.08)
Average precipitation days (≥ 0.1 mm)	10.9	11.3	15.2	13.2	14.6	18.7	19.6	19.1	12.7	7.5	7.2	7.8	157.8
Average relative humidity (%)	75	80	84	82	81	85	84	83	78	71	71	69	79
Mean monthly sunshine hours	74.9	63.8	62.2	104.0	164.6	159.5	192.2	191.6	192.3	191.0	150.1	120.4	1,666.6
Percentage possible sunshine	22	20	17	27	40	40	47	48	53	53	45	36	37
Source 1: China Meteorological Administration all-time extreme temperatureall-time extreme temperature
Source 2: Weather China

== Nature ==
Critically endangered Chinese white dolphins still live in the waters of these areas such as in Sanniang Bay. They are threatened by various factors such habitat loss.

== Economy ==
In 2004, the GDP totaled 17.5 billion yuan, and the GDP per capita was 5,131 yuan.

Grain cultivation, hog husbandry, fruit growing and fishing are of significance in the surrounding areas.

Qinzhou is also one of the centers of turtle farming; according to one estimate, as of c. 2012, over 10,000 families in the Qinzhou area were involved in that industry, raising 1.25 million turtles at their homes and farms. Around 1,500 tons of turtles are sold by Qinzhou's turtle farmers to the national market every year.

Oysters are also a significant product from Qinzhou. Oyster farming has reached 230,000 tons a year in an area of 10,100 hectares (38.9 square miles). It has become so popular, every year from December 1–28, Qinzhou hosts its annual Oyster Festival. Gourmet food is served and the oyster is celebrated all month long. People from all over the world go to enjoy oysters prepared in a variety of ways. There are demonstrations where chefs prepare oysters the way you want right in front of you.

== Famous people ==
- Liu Yongfu (1837–1917) soldier of fortune, creator of the Black Flag Army
- Han Feng (1956–) Tobacco monopoly apparatchik outed in 2010 as a "Chinese Casanova"
- Chen Xingqian, one of the founders of Qinzhou's turtle farming industry
- Feng Zicai (1818 – 1903)

== Sister cities ==
- Qinzhou currently has a sister city, Kuantan, Malaysia.
