= ISO 639-6 =

Deprecated language code standard

ISO 639-6, Codes for the representation of names of languages—Part 6: Alpha-4 code for comprehensive coverage of language variants, was a proposed international standard in the ISO 639 series, developed by ISO/TC 37/SC 2. It contained four-letter codes that denote variants of languages and language families. This allowed one to differentiate between, for example, historical (glvx) versus revived (rvmx) Manx, while ISO 639-3 only includes glv for Manx.

The data supporting ISO 639-6 was researched and compiled by the ISO's registration authority GeoLang. ISO 639-6 was published on 17 November 2009, and withdrawn on 25 November 2014 because of concerns about its usefulness and maintainability. The database also links each language and family to its principal ancestor, allowing the user to follow the classification of various languages. For example, the codes and ancestry of English is given below:

ISO 639-6 code	Language(s)	ISO 639-3 scope	ISO 639-3 type	ISO 639-2/3 code	ISO 639-2/5 code
	English	Individual	Living	eng	
emen	Early Modern English (ca. 1485 – ca. 1660)	Individual	Living	(eng)	
emse	Early Midland and South Eastern Middle English	Individual	Historic	(enm)	
meng	Middle English (ca. 1066 – ca. 1350)	Individual	Historic	enm	
ango	Anglo Saxon (Old English) (ca. 450 – ca. 1250)	Individual	Historic	ang	
angl	Anglic	Collective			(gmw)
nsea	North Sea (Ingvaeonic)	Collective			(gmw)
gmcw	West Germanic	Collective			gmw
grmc	Germanic	Collective			gem
ineu	Indo-European	Collective			ine
wrld	World (undetermined)	Special		und	

The database differentiated between different scripts used for the same language. For example, a number of different scripts were used in the Ottoman Empire and as a result the Ottoman Turkish language has been categorized as follows:

ISO 639-6 code	Language or variant	ISO 639-3 scope	ISO 639-3 type	ISO 639-2/3 code	ISO 15924 code
	Turkish, Ottoman (1500–1928)	Individual	Historic	ota	
otaa	Turkish, Ottoman (1500–1928), Armenian script	Individual	Historic	ota	Armn
otah	Turkish, Ottoman (1500–1928), Hellenic script	Individual	Historic	ota	Grek
otap	Turkish, Ottoman (1500–1928), Perso-Arabic script	Individual	Historic	ota	Arab

== See also ==
- List of ISO 639-6 codes
- ISO 639-5: 3-letter codes for language families and groups ("remainder" groups from legacy ISO 639-2 were extended inclusively in ISO 639-5).
- ISO 15924: 4-letter codes for the representation of names of scripts (most of them also used in BCP 47 as "script subtags").
- IETF language tag: 5-to-8-letter codes used as "variant subtags", assigned and maintained in the IANA database for BCP 47 language tags.
