= Great Dictionary of Modern Chinese Dialects =

2002 compendium edited by Li Rong

- Editor: Li Rong
- Original title: 現代漢語方言大詞典
- Language: Chinese
- Subject: Dialectology
- Published: 2002 (Jiangsu Educational Press)
- Publication place: China
- Pages: 6556
- ISBN: 978-7-5343-5080-1

Chinese dialect groups

The Great Dictionary of Modern Chinese Dialects (Chinese: 現代漢語方言大詞典; pinyin: Xiàndài Hànyǔ fāngyán dà cídiǎn) is a compendium of dictionaries for 42 local varieties of Chinese following a common format. The individual dictionaries cover dialects spread across the dialect groups identified in the Language Atlas of China:

- Mandarin
  - Northeastern Mandarin: Harbin dialect
  - Ji–Lu Mandarin: Jinan dialect
  - Jiao–Liao Mandarin: Muping dialect
  - Central Plains Mandarin: Luoyang dialect, Wanrong dialect, Xi'an dialect, Xining dialect, Xuzhou dialect
  - Lanyin Mandarin: Urumqi dialect, Yinchuan dialect
  - Southwestern Mandarin: Chengdu dialect, Guiyang dialect, Liuzhou dialect, Wuhan dialect
  - Lower Yangtze Mandarin: Nanjing dialect, Yangzhou dialect
- Jin: Taiyuan dialect, Xinzhou dialect
- Wu
  - Taihu Wu: Chongming dialect, Danyang dialect, Hangzhou dialect, Ningbo dialect, Shanghai dialect, Suzhou dialect
  - Wuzhou Wu: Jinhua dialect
  - Oujiang Wu: Wenzhou dialect
- Hui: Jixi dialect
- Gan: Lichuan dialect, Nanchang dialect, Pingxiang dialect
- Xiang: Changsha dialect, Loudi dialect
- Min: Fuzhou dialect, Haikou dialect, Jian'ou dialect, Leizhou dialect, Xiamen dialect
- Yue: Dongguan dialect, Guangzhou dialect
- Hakka: Meixian dialect, Yudu dialect
- Pinghua: Nanning dialect

Each dictionary was prepared by specialists in the dialect, and opens with an introduction to the characteristics of the dialect. The main body of each dictionary has between 7,000 and 10,000 entries.
