= Maihua =

Variety of the Chinese language

- 邁話
- Native to: China
- Region: Hainan (Sanya)
- Native speakers: 15,000 (2007)
- Language family: Sino-Tibetan: Sinitic; Chinese; Yue?; Maihua

Language codes
- ISO 639-3: None (mis)
- Glottolog: None

Maihua (simplified Chinese: 迈话; traditional Chinese: 邁話; pinyin: Màihuà, meaning 'Mai speech') or Mai dialect is a variety of Chinese of uncertain affiliation spoken in the area of 崖县 Yáxiàn (Sanya) in southern Hainan, China. It was classified as Yue in the Language Atlas of China. Ouyang, Jiang & Zou (2019) consider Mai to be a divergent Yue Chinese variety with Hakka and other mixed influences. There are just over 10,000 speakers of Mai in southern Hainan.

A comprehensive description of Mai was published in a monograph by Ouyang, Jiang & Zou (2019).

== Names ==
Mai speakers refer to themselves as mai¹³nɔn⁵⁵ (迈人).

== Classification ==
Jiang et al. (2007) considers Mai to be a mix of Yue Chinese, Hakka-Gan, and Hainanese Min.

== Distribution ==
Mai is spoken in the following four villages in southern Hainan.

- Yanglan Village (羊栏村), Fenghuang Town (凤凰镇), originally called Yanglan Town 羊栏镇), in the northwestern part of Sanya City (5,000 speakers). Mai speakers of Yanglan Village claimed that their ancestors had migrated from Shuinan Village (水南村) over 10 generations ago.
- Linjia Village (林家村) and Miaoshan Village (妙山村) of Miaolin Township (妙林乡, 6,000 speakers)
- Shuinan Village (水南村), Gongbei Village (拱北村), etc., in Yacheng Town (崖城镇), western Sanya City (三亚市, about 1,000 speakers)

The Utsat language is spoken just to the west of the Mai area. Just to the southwest is Haibo Village (海波村), where Danzhouhua (儋州话) is spoken.
