= Danzhou dialect =

Unclassified Yue Chinese dialect

Danzhou
- 儋州話
- Danzhou dialect
- Native to: China
- Region: Hainan (Danzhou)
- Native speakers: 700,000 (2010)
- Language family: Sino-Tibetan: Sinitic; Chinese; Yue?; Danzhou

Language codes
- ISO 639-3: None (mis)
- Linguist List: 1mk-dan
- Glottolog: None
- Linguasphere: 79-AAA-naa

The Danzhou dialect (simplified Chinese: 儋州话; traditional Chinese: 儋州話; pinyin: Dānzhōuhuà), locally known as Xianghua (simplified Chinese: 乡话; traditional Chinese: 鄉話; pinyin: xiānghuà; lit. 'village speech'), is a Chinese variety of uncertain affiliation spoken in the area of Danzhou in northwestern Hainan, China. It was classified as Yue in the Language Atlas of China, but in more recent work, it is treated as an unclassified southern variety.

== History ==
The Danzhou people's ancestors came initially from old Gaozhou and Wuzhou prefectures. The Yue language they brought with them was combined with the native popular language, and by the time of the Tang dynasty, the Danzhou dialect was officially formed.

== Varieties ==
Regional varieties are Bei'an 北岸音, Shuinan 水南音, Zhoujia 昼家音, Shanshang 山上音, Haitou 海头音, and Wuhu 五湖音.

== Distribution ==
The Danzhou dialect is spoken in the following areas of Hainan (Hainan 1994:253).

- most of Danzhou 儋州市 except for the southeastern part of Danzhou
- Changjiang Li Autonomous County 昌江县 (northern coast)
  - Nanluo 南罗 and Haiwei 海尾 area
  - Xiyuan 西缘, Shiluo Town 石碌镇, Changjiang city
- northern Baisha Li Autonomous County 白沙县 (in just over 10 villages near the border with Danzhou)
- peripheral villages of Dongfang 东方市, Ledong 乐东, Qiongzhong 琼中, and Sanya 三亚

== See also ==
- Mai Chinese
