= Li Rong (linguist) =

Chinese linguist

- Born: February 4, 1920
- Died: December 31, 2002 (aged 82)
- Scientific career
- Fields: Chinese language
- Institutions: CASS Institute of Linguistics

Chinese name
- Traditional Chinese: 李榮
- Simplified Chinese: 李荣
Transcriptions
Standard Mandarin
- Hanyu Pinyin: Lǐ Róng
- Wade–Giles: Li^{2} Jung^{3}
- IPA: [lǐ ɻʊ̀ŋ]
Wu
- Wugniu: li^{4} yon^{2}
- IPA: Shanghainese: [li˩ ɦioŋ˦]
Yue: Cantonese
- Jyutping: lei^{5} wing^{4}
- IPA: [lej˩˧.wɪŋ˩]

Li Rong (4 February 1920 – 31 December 2002) was a Chinese linguist known for his work on Chinese dialectology. He was director of the Institute of Linguistics at the Chinese Academy of Social Sciences from 1982 to 1985, and editor of the Language Atlas of China and the Great Dictionary of Modern Chinese Dialects.

Li Rong was born in Wenling county, Zhejiang. In 1939 he was admitted to the Southwest Associated University in Kunming, studying Chinese literature. In 1943, he went on to postgraduate study at the Language Institute of Peking University, then based in Kunming. His master's thesis, a study of the system of fanqie pronunciation guides in the Qieyun, a 7th-century rime dictionary, was published in 1952. In this work, he demonstrated that the mysterious "divisions" of the later rime tables reflected distributional patterns in the Qieyun.

Li Rong founded the Chinese dialectology journal Fangyan in 1979, and served as its editor. He led a team from the Chinese Academy of Social Sciences, collaborating with the Australian Academy of the Humanities to produce the Language Atlas of China in 1987. The Atlas was based on Li's revised classification of Chinese dialects, with separate Jin, Hui and Pinghua groups. Although this classification has been adopted by many workers, it remains controversial. Li was also the chief editor of the Great Dictionary of Modern Chinese Dialects, containing descriptions of 42 varieties from locations scattered across China.

== Selected works ==
- Li, Rong (1952). Qièyùn yīnxì 切韵音系 [Qieyun phonology] (in Chinese). Chinese Academy of Sciences.
- —— (1957). Hànyǔ fāngyán diàochá shǒucè 汉语方言调查手册 [Chinese dialects investigation manual] (in Chinese). Beijing.
- —— (1979). "Wēnlǐng fāngyán de liándú biàndiào" 温岭方言的连读变调 [Tone sandhi in the Wenling dialect]. Fangyan (in Chinese) (1): 1–29.
- Wurm, Stephen Adolphe; Li, Rong; Baumann, Theo; Lee, Mei W. (1987). Language Atlas of China. Longman. ISBN 978-962-359-085-3.
