= Jin Chinese =

Branch of Chinese spoken in northern China

Jin
- 晋语 / 晉語 晋方言 / 晉方言
- Jinyu written in Chinese characters (vertically, traditional Chinese on the left, simplified Chinese on the right)
- Native to: China
- Region: most of Shanxi province; central Inner Mongolia; parts of Hebei, Henan, Shaanxi
- Native speakers: 48 million (2021)
- Language family: Sino-Tibetan: Sinitic; Chinese; Jin

Language codes
- ISO 639-3: cjy
- Glottolog: jiny1235
- Linguasphere: 79-AAA-c
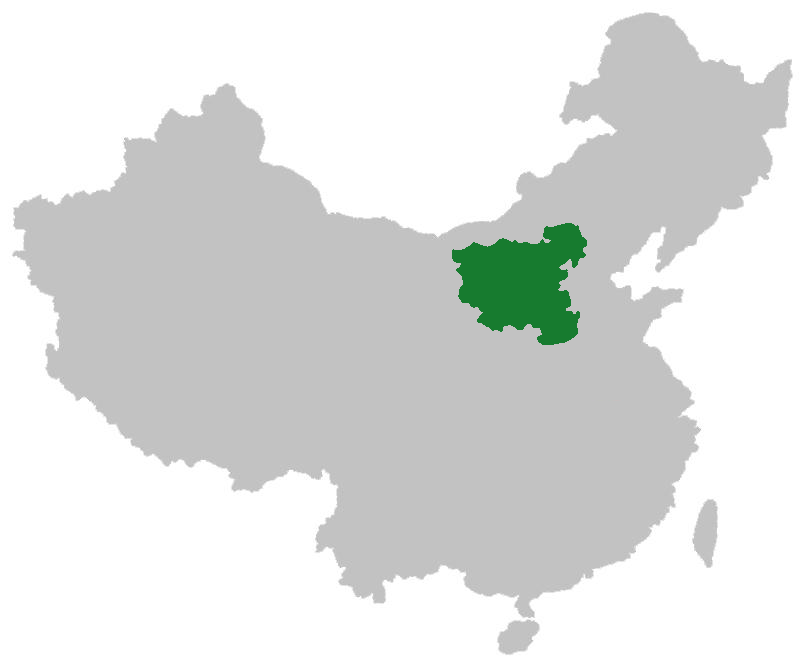

Jin Chinese
- Traditional Chinese: 晉語
- Simplified Chinese: 晋语
Transcriptions
Standard Mandarin
- Hanyu Pinyin: Jìnyǔ
- Bopomofo: ㄐㄧㄣˋ ㄩˇ
- Wade–Giles: Chin^{4}-yü^{3}
- IPA: [tɕîn.ỳ]
Yue: Cantonese
- Yale Romanization: Jeunyúh
- Jyutping: Zeon3 jyu5
- IPA: [tsɵn˧ jy˩˧]

Alternative Chinese name
- Traditional Chinese: 山西話
- Simplified Chinese: 山西话
- Literal meaning: Shanxi speech
Transcriptions
Standard Mandarin
- Hanyu Pinyin: Shānxīhuà
- Bopomofo: ㄕㄢ ㄒㄧ ㄏㄨㄚˋ
- Wade–Giles: Shan^{1}-hsi^{1}-hua^{4}
- IPA: [ʂán.ɕí.xwâ]
Yue: Cantonese
- Yale Romanization: Sāansāi wá
- Jyutping: Saan1 sai1 waa2
- IPA: [san˥.sɐj˥.wa˧˥]

Jin (simplified Chinese: 晋语; traditional Chinese: 晉語; pinyin: Jìnyǔ) is a group of Chinese linguistic varieties spoken by roughly 48 million people in northern China, including most of Shanxi province, much of central Inner Mongolia, and adjoining areas in Hebei, Henan, and Shaanxi provinces.

Although Jin was traditionally classified as a branch of Mandarin due to partial mutual intelligibility with neighboring varieties, modern linguistic research has largely established Jin as a distinct Sinitic branch independent of Mandarin. In linguistic terms, Jin is widely regarded as the only major non-Mandarin Sinitic variety predominantly spoken in northern China, distinguishing it from surrounding Mandarin-speaking regions.

== Classification ==
After the concept of Mandarin Chinese was proposed, the Jin dialects were universally included within it, mainly because Chinese linguists paid little attention to these dialects at the time. In order to promote Standard Mandarin in the early days of People's Republic of China, linguists started to research various dialects in Shanxi, comparing these dialects with Standard Mandarin for helping the locals to learn it more quickly. During this period, a few linguists discovered some unique features of Jin Chinese that do not exist in other northern Mandarin dialects, planting the seeds for the future independence of Jin Chinese. Finally, in 1985, Li Rong proposed that Jin should be considered a separate top-level dialect group, similar to Yue or Wu. His main criterion was that Jin dialects had preserved the entering tone as a separate category, still marked with a glottal stop as in the Wu dialects, but distinct in this respect from most other Mandarin dialects. Some linguists have adopted this classification. However, others disagree that Jin should be considered a separate dialect group for these reasons:

1. Use of the entering tone as a diagnostic feature is inconsistent with the way that all other Chinese dialect groups have been delineated based on the reflexes of the Middle Chinese voiced initials.
2. Certain other Mandarin dialects also preserve the glottal stop, especially the Jianghuai dialects, and so far, no linguist has claimed that these dialects should also be split from Mandarin.

== Dialects ==
The Language Atlas of China divides Jin into the following eight groups:

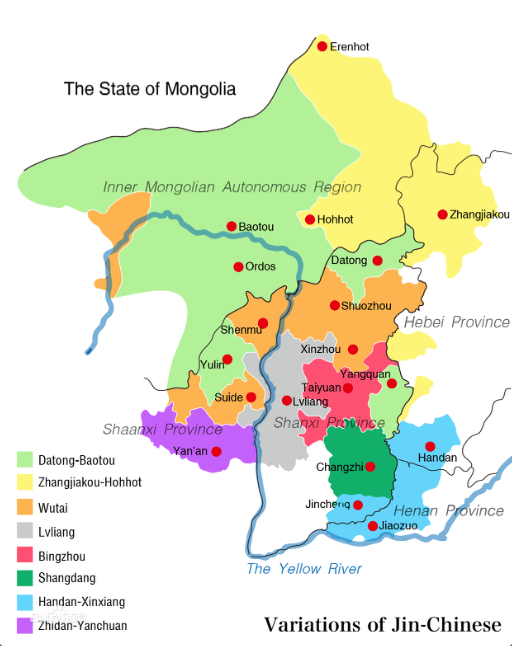
The main dialect areas of Jin in China.

- Bingzhou group (Chinese: 并州片), spoken in central Shanxi (the ancient Bing Province), including Taiyuan. Most dialects under this group can distinguish the light entering tone from the dark one, with only 1 level tone. In many dialects, especially those to the south of Taiyuan, the voiced obstruents from Middle Chinese become tenuis in all 4 tones, namely [b] → [p], [d] → [t] and [ɡ] → [k].
- Lüliang group (Chinese: 呂梁片), spoken in western Shanxi (including Lüliang) and northern Shaanxi. Dialects under this group can differentiate light entering tone from dark entering tone. In most dialects, the voiced obstruents from Middle Chinese become aspirated in both level and entering tones, namely [b] → [pʰ], [d] → [tʰ] and [ɡ] → [kʰ].
- Shangdang group (simplified Chinese: 上党片; traditional Chinese: 上黨片), spoken in the area of Changzhi (ancient Shangdang) in southeastern Shanxi. Dialects under this group can differentiate light entering tone from dark entering tone. The palatalization of velar consonants does not occur in some dialects.
- Wutai group (simplified Chinese: 五台片; traditional Chinese: 五臺片), spoken in parts of northern Shanxi (including Wutai County) and central Inner Mongolia. A few Dialects under this group can differentiate light entering tone from dark entering tone, while the others cannot. The fusion of the level tone and the rising one occurred in some dialects, though some linguists claim every dialect under this group has this feature.
- Da-Bao group (Chinese: 大包片), spoken in parts of northern Shanxi and central Inner Mongolia, including Baotou.
- Zhangjiakou–Hohhot group (simplified Chinese: 张呼片; traditional Chinese: 張呼片), spoken in Zhangjiakou in northwestern Hebei and parts of central Inner Mongolia, including Hohhot.
- Han-Xin group (Chinese: 邯新片), spoken in southeastern Shanxi, southern Hebei (including Handan) and northern Henan (including Xinxiang).
- Zhi-Yan group (Chinese: 志延片), spoken in Zhidan County and Yanchuan County in northern Shaanxi.

The Taiyuan dialect from the Bingzhou group is sometimes taken as a convenient representative of Jin because many studies of this dialect are available, but most linguists agree that the Taiyuan vocabulary is heavily influenced by Mandarin, making it unrepresentative of Jin. The Lüliang group is usually regarded as the "core" of the Jin language group as it preserves most archaic features of Jin. However, there is no consensus as to which dialect among the Lüliang group is the representative dialect.

== Phonology ==
Unlike most varieties of Mandarin, Jin has preserved a final glottal stop, which is the remnant of a final stop consonant (/p/, /t/ or /k/). This is in common with the Early Mandarin of the Yuan dynasty (c. 14th century AD) and with a number of modern southern varieties of Chinese. In Middle Chinese, syllables closed with a stop consonant had no tone. However, Chinese linguists prefer to categorize such syllables as belonging to a separate tone class, traditionally called the "entering tone". Syllables closed with a glottal stop in Jin are still toneless, or alternatively, Jin can be said to still maintain the entering tone. In standard Mandarin Chinese, syllables formerly ending with a glottal stop have been reassigned to one of the other tone classes in a seemingly random fashion.

=== Initials ===
Consonants of the Taiyuan dialect
		Labial	Alveolar	Alveolo- palatal	Velar
Stop	voiceless	p	t		k
Stop	aspirated	pʰ	tʰ		kʰ
Affricate	voiceless		ts	tɕ	
Affricate	aspirated		tsʰ	tɕʰ	
Fricative	voiceless	f	s	ɕ	x
Fricative	voiced	v	z		ɣ
Nasal		m	n		ŋ
Approximant			l		

- [ŋ] is mainly used in finals.

Consonants of the Fenyang dialect
		Labial	Alveolar	Alveolo- palatal	Retroflex	Velar
Stop	voiceless	p	t			k
Stop	aspirated	pʰ	tʰ			kʰ
Affricate	voiceless		ts	tɕ	tʂ	
Affricate	aspirated		tsʰ	tɕʰ	tʂʰ	
Fricative	voiceless	f	s	ɕ	ʂ	x
Fricative	voiced	v	z		ʐ	
Fricative	prenasal		nᵈz			
Nasal		m	n	ɲ	ɳ	ŋ
Approximant			l			

- The nasal consonant sounds may vary between nasal sounds [m, n, ɲ, ɳ, ŋ] or prenasalised stop sounds [ᵐb, ⁿd, ᶯɖʐ, ᶮdʲ, ᵑɡ].
- A prenasalised affricated fricative sound /nᵈz/, is also present.

=== Finals ===
Vowels of the Taiyuan dialect
			Oral					Nasal				Check		
Medial		∅	coda	a	e	i	u	ŋ	æ̃	ɛ̃	∅	∅	ə	a
Nucleus	∅					ei		ɒŋ	æ̃		ɒ̃	ɐʔ	əʔ	aʔ
Nucleus	Vowel	i		ia	ie			iŋ		iɛ̃	iɒ̃		iəʔ	iaʔ
Nucleus	Vowel	y			ye			yŋ		yɛ̃			yəʔ	
Nucleus	Vowel	a				ai	au							
Nucleus	Vowel						əu	əŋ						
Nucleus	Vowel							oŋ						
Nucleus	Vowel	ɤ	uɤ											
Nucleus	Vowel	u		ua				uŋ	uæ̃		uɒ̃		uəʔ	uaʔ
Triphthong			iəu	uai		uei	iau	iəŋ						
Triphthong								yəŋ						
Triphthong								uəŋ						
Syllabic		ɹ̩	əɹ̩											

Vowels of the Fenyang dialect
				Oral				Nasal			Check		
Medial		∅	lab.	coda	a	i	u	ŋ	ã	∅	∅	a	ə
Nucleus	∅						ɑu		ã	ə̃	eʔ	aʔ	əʔ
Nucleus	Vowel	i		iɔ	ia		iu		iã	ĩ	ieʔ	iaʔ	
Nucleus	Vowel	y		yɔ	ya			yŋ	yã		yeʔ	yaʔ	
Nucleus	Vowel					ei	eu	eŋ					
Nucleus	Vowel	a				ai							
Nucleus	Vowel									iə̃			
Nucleus	Vowel	ɔ											
Nucleus	Vowel	o					ou	oŋ					
Nucleus	Vowel						ɤu						
Nucleus	Vowel	ɯ		iɯ									
Nucleus	Vowel	u		uɔ	ua	ui		uŋ	uã		ueʔ	uaʔ	uəʔ
Triphthong				iai	uai	uei	iɑu						
Triphthong							iou	uoŋ					
Syllabic		ɹ̩	ɹ̩ʷ	əɹ̩									

- The diphthong /ɤu/ may also be realized as a monophthong close central vowel [ʉ].
- Sounds ending in the sequence /-aʔ/ may also be heard as [-ɛʔ], then realized as [ɛʔ, iɛʔ, yɛʔ, uɛʔ].
- /y/ can also be heard as a labio-palatal approximant [ɥ] when preceding initial consonants.
- /i/ when occurring after alveolar sounds /ts, tsʰ, s/ can be heard as an alveolar syllabic [ɹ̩], and is heard as a retroflex syllabic [ɻ̩] when occurring after retroflex consonants /tʂ, tʂʰ, ʂ, ʐ/.

=== Tones ===
Jin employs extremely complex tone sandhi, or tone changes that occur when words are put together into phrases. The tone sandhi of Jin is notable in two ways among Chinese varieties:

- Tone sandhi rules depend on the grammatical structure of the words being put together. Hence, an adjective–noun compound may go through different sets of changes compared to a verb–object compound.
- There are Jin varieties in which the "dark level" tone category (yīnpíng 阴平) and "light level" (yángpíng 阳平) tone have merged in isolation but can still be distinguished in tone sandhi contexts. That is, while e.g. Standard Mandarin has a tonal distinction between Tone 1 and Tone 2, corresponding words in Jin Chinese may have the same tone when pronounced separately. However, these words can still be distinguished in connected speech. For example, in Pingyao Jin, dark level tou 偷 'secretly' and ting 听 'to listen' on the one hand, and light level tao 桃 'peach' and hong 红 'red' on the other hand, all have the same rising tone [˩˧] when pronounced in isolation. Yet, when these words are combined into touting 偷听 'eavesdropping' and taohong 桃红 'peach red', the tonal distinction emerges. In touting, tou has a falling tone [˧˩] and ting has a high-rising tone [˧˥], whereas both syllables in taohong still have the same low-rising tone [˩˧] as in isolation.
- According to Guo (1989) and also noted by Sagart (1999), the departing (qusheng 去声) tone category in the Jin dialect of Xiaoyi is characterized by -ʰ and a high falling tone [˥˧]. Xiaoyi also lacks a voicing split in the level tone. The rising (shangsheng 上声) tone in Xiaoyi is also "characterized by a glottal break in the middle of the syllable [˧˩ʔ˩˨]".

== Grammar ==
Jin readily employs prefixes such as 圪 /kəʔ/, 黑 /xəʔ/, 忽 /xuəʔ/, and 入(日) /ʐəʔ/, in a variety of derivational constructions. For example:
入鬼 "fool around" < 鬼 "ghost, devil"

In addition, there are a number of words in Jin that evolved, evidently, by splitting a mono-syllabic word into two, adding an 'l' in between (cf. Ubbi Dubbi, but with /l/ instead of /b/). For example:

/pəʔ ləŋ/ < 蹦 /pəŋ/ "hop"
/tʰəʔ luɤ/ < 拖 /tʰuɤ/ "drag"
/kuəʔ la/ < 刮 /kua/ "scrape"
/xəʔ lɒ̃/ < 巷 /xɒ̃/ "street"

A similar process can in fact be found in most Mandarin dialects (e.g. 窟窿 kulong < 孔 kong), but it is especially common in Jin.

This may be a kind of reservation for double-initials in Old Chinese, although this is still controversial. For example, the character 孔 (pronounced /kʰoːŋ/ in Mandarin) which appears more often as 窟窿 /kʰuəʔ luŋ/ in Jin, had the pronunciation like /kʰloːŋ/ in Old Chinese.

Some dialects of Jin make a three-way distinction in demonstratives. (Modern English, for example, has only a two-way distinction between "this" and "that", with "yon" being archaic.)

== Vocabulary ==
There is considerable lexical diversity in Jin Chinese, with some words having very distinct regional forms. Usually, there are more unique words in the core dialects than in the non-core dialects. Moreover, some cannot be easily represented using Chinese characters.
