= Guanzhong dialect =

Mandarin dialect in Shaanxi province

- Xi'anese
- 西安話 Xǐ'ngǎnhuā
- Native to: China
- Region: Guanzhong, Shaanxi
- Speakers: 22.17 million (2012)
- Language family: Sino-Tibetan: Sinitic; Chinese; Mandarin; Central Plains; Guanzhong dialect

Language codes
- ISO 639-3: –
- Glottolog: xian1253

The Guanzhong dialect (simplified Chinese: 关中话; traditional Chinese: 關中話; pinyin: Guānzhōnghuà) is a dialect of Central Plains Mandarin spoken in Shaanxi's Guanzhong region, including the prefecture-level capital city of Xi'an. Since the speech of Xi'an is considered the prototypical Guanzhong speech, the Guanzhong dialect is sometimes referred to as Xi'anese (simplified Chinese: 陕西话; traditional Chinese: 陝西話; pinyin: Shǎnxīhuà or simplified Chinese: 西安话; traditional Chinese: 西安話; pinyin: Xī'ānhuà).

The varieties spoken in northern and southern Shaanxi differ from that of Guanzhong, such as that of Hanzhong, which is a Southwestern Mandarin lect, more closely related to Sichuanese.

In general, the Guanzhong dialect can be classified into two sub-dialects: the Xifu dialect (西府话; 西府話), or the 'dialect of the western prefectures', which is spoken in the west of Xi'an, in Baoji of Shaanxi Province; Tianshui, Qingyang, Pingliang, Longnan of Gansu Province; and south of Guyuan of Ningxia Province, and the Dongfu dialect (东府话; 東府話), or the 'dialect of the eastern prefectures', spoken in Xi'an, Weinan, Tongchuan, Xianyang and Shangluo of Shaanxi Province.

Due to the prevalence of Standard Mandarin in urban areas such as Xi'an, the younger generations tend to speak Standard Mandarin or Guanzhong-accented Standard Mandarin. Due to the lexical and grammatical similarities between Northern Mandarin varieties, attrition of these dialects is more serious. Authorities have moved in to document the local dialects to preserve them.

Although Xi'an was established by the 11th century BCE, the modern Mandarin dialect spoken likely has very little relation to Zhou, Qin, or Han dynasty speech, as Old Mandarin originated in the Yuan dynasty. A recorded 73.5% of young people in Xi'an city can proficiently utilise the dialect. The remainder of this article describes the urban variety of Xi'an.

== Phonology ==
Note: The following is a description of the lect of urban Xi'an, and should not be used as a generalization of all of Guanzhong.

Like other Mandarin dialects, Xi'anese is tonal has a strict CGVN syllable structure. The following is an outline of phonemes as seen in the speech of younger speakers, with romanization adapted from Hanyu Pinyin.

=== Initials ===
		Labial	Alveolar		Retroflex	Alveolo- palatal	Velar
		Labial	plain	sibilant	Retroflex	Alveolo- palatal	Velar
Nasal		m ⟨m⟩	n ⟨n⟩				ŋ ⟨ng⟩
Plosive/ Affricate	tenuis	p ⟨b⟩	t ⟨d⟩	ts ⟨z⟩	tʂ ⟨zh⟩	tɕ ⟨j⟩	k ⟨g⟩
Plosive/ Affricate	aspirated	pʰ ⟨p⟩	tʰ ⟨t⟩	tsʰ ⟨c⟩	tʂʰ ⟨ch⟩	tɕʰ ⟨q⟩	kʰ ⟨k⟩
Fricative	voiceless	f ⟨f⟩		s ⟨s⟩	ʂ ⟨sh⟩	ɕ ⟨x⟩	x ⟨h⟩
Fricative	voiced	v ⟨v⟩			ʐ ⟨r⟩		

- Older speakers may also have a pair of labiodental affricates /pf pfʰ/.

=== Finals ===
Glide / Nucleus	∅		ɑ	ɛ	ɤ	o	ei	ɑu	ou	ẽ	æ̃	əŋ	ɑŋ
∅	ɿ ⟨i⟩	ʅ ⟨i⟩	ɑ ⟨a⟩	ɛ ⟨ai⟩	ɤ ⟨e⟩	o ⟨o⟩	ei ⟨ei⟩	ɑu ⟨au⟩	ou ⟨ou⟩	ẽ ⟨en⟩	æ̃ ⟨an⟩	əŋ ⟨eng⟩	ɑŋ ⟨ang⟩
i	i ⟨i⟩		iɑ ⟨ia⟩	iɛ ⟨ie⟩				iɑu ⟨iao⟩	iou ⟨iu⟩	iẽ ⟨in⟩	iæ̃ ⟨ian⟩	iŋ ⟨ing⟩	iɑŋ ⟨iang⟩
u	u ⟨u⟩		uɑ ⟨ua⟩	uɛ ⟨uai⟩		uo ⟨uo⟩	uei ⟨ui⟩			uẽ ⟨un⟩	uæ̃ ⟨uan⟩	uŋ ⟨ung⟩	uɑŋ ⟨uang⟩
y	y ⟨ü⟩			yɛ ⟨üe⟩		yo ⟨üo⟩				yẽ ⟨ün⟩	yæ̃ ⟨üan⟩	yŋ ⟨üng⟩	

Some older speakers may have an irregular /ɯ/ rime for some words with the /ɤ/ (e) final.

==== Erhua ====
Erhua in Xi'an's local variety is rhotic. All rimes have the potential to undergo erhua aside from er and /ɯ/. Note that, as per Sinological IPA, /r/ refers to an approximant [ɹ ~ ɻ].

Plain rime	Erhua rime
i (/ɿ ʅ/), ei, en, eng	/ər/
i (/i/), in, ing	/iər/
u, ui, uen, ung	/uər/
ü, üen, üng	/yər/
a, ai, an, ang	/ɑr/
ia, ian, iang	/iɑr/
uo, uai, uan, uang	/uɑr/
üan	/yɑr/
ie	/iɛr/
üe	/yɛr/
e	/ɤr/
o	/or/
uo	/uor/
üo	/yor/
au	/ɑur/
iau	/iɑr/
ou	/our/
iu	/iour/

=== Tones ===
The speech of Xi'an has four tones and one neutral tone. It also has tone sandhi system.

Traditional name	Tone value	Diacritic
Dark level	21 /˨˩/	caron (ǎ)
Light level	24 /˨˦/	acute (á)
Rising	53 /˥˧/	grave (à)
Departing	44 /˦/	macron (ā)

Like many other Northern Mandarin varieties, the variety lacks a checked tone, and instead distributes it regularly in its other tone categories.

==== Right-prominent sandhi ====
Two syllables with dark level tones spoken in succession results in the prior's tone mutating into 24 /˨˦/.

Term	Pinyin	IPA	Gloss
開花	kěhuǎ → kéhuǎ	kʰɛ˨˩꜕꜓ xua˨˩	'to blossom'
東北	dǒngběi → dóngběi	tuŋ˨˩꜕꜓ pei˨˩	'northeast'

Two syllables with rising tones spoken in succession or a rising tone followed by a neutral tone results in the prior's tone mutating into 21 /˨˩/.

Term	Pinyin	IPA	Gloss
手錶	shòubiào → shǒubiào	ʂou˥˧꜕꜖ piau˥˧	'wristwatch'
保險	bàoxiàn → bǎoxiàn	pau˥˧꜕꜖ ɕiæ̃˥˧	'insurance'
老虎	làohu → lǎohu	lau˥˧꜕꜖ xu	'tiger'

==== Erhua sandhi ====
A departing tone that has an erhua suffix is realised as 53 /˥˧/.

Term	Pinyin	IPA	Gloss
鏡兒	jīngr → jìngr	tɕiŋr˦꜒꜔	'mirror'
一半兒	yǐbānr → yǐbànr	i˨˩ pæ̃r˦꜒꜔	'half'

Certain tones, in syllables that are reduplicated and with erhua applied, undergo sandhi on the second syllable. The dark level and rising tones both is realised as 24 /˨˦/ and the departing tone becomes 53 /˥˧/.

Term	Pinyin	IPA	Gloss
輕輕兒	qǐngqǐngr → qǐngqíngr	tɕʰiŋ˨˩ tɕʰiŋr˨˩꜕꜓	'light'
短短兒	duànduànr → duànduánr	tuæ̃˥˧ tuæ̃˥˧꜕꜓	'short'
大大兒	dādār → dādàr	ta˦ tar˦꜒꜔	'large'

== Internal differences ==
Note: The following is a description of the lect of urban Xi'an, and is largely irrelevant to other lect areas.

The speech in all districts of Xi'an except for Yanliang is often considered part of Xi'an's urban variety. This lect, like other Sinitic languages, shows differences between urban and suburban dialects. Generational differences are also present.

=== Regional differences ===
The varieties in suburban parts of Xi'an have certain phonological differences to that of the urban center.

The urban alveolar plosives /t tʰ/, when followed by /i/, palatalize in some parts of Baqiao District.

	Urban	Dizhai Subdistrict	Gloss
掂	tiæ̃˨˩	tɕiæ̃˨˩	'to take'
地	ti˦	tɕi˦	'ground'

In Dizhai, the labiodental affricates /pf pfʰ/ are realised as /tsʮ tsʰʮ/.

	Urban (Old)	Dizhai Subdistrict	Gloss
豬	pfu˨˩	tsʮ˨˩	'pig'
出	pfʰʮ˨˩	tsʰʮ˨˩	'to go out'

In many parts of suburban Xi'an, the /i/ vowel breaks into /ei/ after labiodental fricatives /f v/.

=== Generational differences ===
The speech of the youth shows clear influence from Standard Mandarin. The two most noticeable differences are as follows:

Young people's speech merges the labiodental /pf pfʰ f v/ initials with the retroflex /tʂ tʂʰ ʂ ʐ/ series in certain situations.

	Old	New	Beijing	Gloss
豬	pfu˨˩	tʂu˨˩	zhū	'pig'
穿	pfʰæ̃˨˩	tʂʰuæ̃˨˩	chuān	'to wear'
書	fu˨˩	ʂu˨˩	shū	'book'
軟	væ̃˥˧	ʐæ̃˥˧	ruǎn	'soft'

Young people's speech breaks the /i/ vowel after labiodental fricatives /f v/.

	Old	New	Beijing	Gloss
肥	fi˨˦	fei˨˦	féi	'fat'
味	vi˦	vei˦	wèi	'flavor'

=== Religious differences ===
The Muslim Hui people differ from the speech of the Han Chinese primarily in terms of vocabulary. These differences can be seen in, for instance, familial terms and terminology from the Qur'an.

== See also ==
- Qinqiang
