= Chinese braille =

Chinese braille refers to Standard Mandarin braille systems:

- Mainland Chinese Braille, for Putonghua in China
- Two-Cell Chinese Braille, for Putonghua in China
- Taiwanese Braille, for Guoyu in Taiwan

== See also ==
- Cantonese Braille
- Braille kanji
