= Language Atlas of China =

Book published in 1987 and 1989

- Author: Stephen Adolphe Wurm, Rong Li, Theo Baumann, Mei W. Lee
- Publisher: Longman
- Publication date: 1987, 1989
- ISBN: 978-962-359-085-3
- OCLC: 431787427

The Language Atlas of China (simplified Chinese: 中国语言地图集; traditional Chinese: 中國語言地圖集; pinyin: Zhōngguó yǔyán dìtú jí), published by Hong Kong Longman Publishing Company in two parts in 1987 and 1989, maps the distribution of both the varieties of Chinese and ethnic minority languages of China. The atlas was a collaborative effort by the Australian Academy of the Humanities and the Chinese Academy of Social Sciences, published simultaneously in the original Chinese and in English translation. Endymion Wilkinson rated this joint venture "outstanding".

A second edition was published by the Commercial Press in 2012.

== Classification of Chinese varieties ==
Top-level groups and supergroups of Chinese varieties identified in the Atlas

The atlas organizes the varieties of Chinese in a hierarchy of groupings, following the work of Li Rong:

- supergroups (大区 dàqū): Mandarin and Min
- groups (区 qū): Jin, Wu, Hui, Xiang, Gan, Hakka, Yue, Pinghua and groups within Mandarin and Min
- subgroups (片 piàn)
- clusters (小片 xiǎopiàn) are only identified for some subgroups
- local dialects (点 diǎn): localities that were surveyed

== Contents ==
The atlas contains 36 coloured maps, printed on loose white sheets measuring 15 in × 20.75 in (38.1 cm × 52.7 cm). Each map is accompanied by a blue sheet of the same size containing explanatory notes. The atlas is divided into three sections:

- A. General maps
  - A1 Languages in China
  - A2 Chinese dialects in China
  - A3 Ethnic Minorities in China
  - A4 Minority languages in China
  - A5 Language distribution (Guangxi Zhuang Autonomous Region)
- B. Maps of Chinese dialects
  - B1 Mandarin-1 (Northeastern China)
  - B2 Mandarin-2 (Beijing, Tianjin, Hebei and western Shandong)
  - B3 Mandarin-3 (Henan, Shandong, northern Anhui, northern Jiangsu)
  - B4 Mandarin-4 (Shaanxi, Gansu, Qinghai, Ningxia)
  - B5 Mandarin-5 (Xinjiang Uygur Autonomous Region)
  - B6 Mandarin-6 (Southwestern China)
  - B7 Jin group (Shanxi and adjacent areas)
  - B8 Chinese dialects (southeastern China)
  - B9 Wu group (Zhejiang, Shanghai, southern Jiangsu)
  - B10 Chinese dialects (southern Anhui area)
  - B11 Chinese dialects (Hunan and Jiangxi)
  - B12 Min supergroup (Fujian, Taiwan, eastern Guangdong and Hainan)
  - B13 Chinese dialects: Guangdong (mainland)
  - B14 Chinese dialects (Guangxi Zhuang Autonomous Region)
  - B15 Hakka group
  - B16 Chinese dialects overseas: (a) insular Southeast Asia (b) other parts of the world
- C. Maps of minority languages
  - C1 Minority languages in northern China
  - C2 Mongolian languages
  - C3 Mongolian dialects
  - C4 Turkic languages
  - C5 Manchu-Tungus languages
  - C6 Minority languages in southern China
  - C7 Kam–Tai languages
  - C8 Miao-Yao languages
  - C9 Dialects of the Miao language
  - C10 Tibeto-Burman languages
  - C11 Tibetan dialects
  - C12 Minority languages (Guangxi Zhuang Autonomous Region)
  - C13 Minority languages (Yunnan province)
  - C14 Minority languages on Hainan and Taiwan islands

== Second edition ==
Work began on a revised edition in 2002. The work was published in 2012 as a joint venture between the Chinese Academy of Social Sciences and the City University of Hong Kong. It consists of two volumes, dealing respectively with varieties of Chinese and minority languages. The revision follows the same structure as the first edition, but the number of maps has increased to 79, and the explanatory text is greatly expanded. The number of minority languages covered has also increased from 81 to 130.

== See also ==
- Demographics of China
- Languages of China
  - Languages of Hong Kong
  - Languages of Macau
