= Pruitt =

Pruitt is a surname of English origin. Notable people with that name include:

== Surname ==
- Anna Seward Pruitt (1862–1948), American missionary to China; mother of Ida
- Austin Pruitt (born 1989), American baseball player
- Charles Pruitt (1930–1985), American politician
- Cicero Washington Pruitt (1857–1946), American missionary to China; father of Ida
- Dillard Pruitt (born 1961), American golfer
- Elinore Pruitt Stewart, (1876–1933), American homesteader in Wyoming and memoirist
- Ervin Pruitt, (born 1940), American stock car racer
- Etric Pruitt (born 1981), American football player
- Evelyn Pruitt (1918–2000), American geographer
- Gabe Pruitt (born 1986), American basketball player
- Greg Pruitt (born 1951), American football player
- Ida Pruitt (1888–1985), American social worker, author, speaker, and interpreter
- John H. Pruitt (1896–1918), American double Medal of Honor recipient
- Jonathan Pruitt, Canadian arachnologist
- Jordan Pruitt (born 1991), American pop singer
- Katie Pruitt (born 1994), American singer-songwriter
- Ken Pruitt (born 1957), American politician from Florida
- Mary Pruitt (1934–2020), American politician
- Mike Pruitt (born 1954), American football player
- Millus and Myles Pruitt, American blues musicians in the 1920s
- MyCole Pruitt, American football player
- Ron Pruitt (born 1951), American baseball player
- Scott Pruitt (born 1968), American politician from Oklahoma
- Steven Pruitt (born 1984), American Wikipedian
- Wendell O. Pruitt (1920–1945), American military pilot
- Willie Franklin Pruitt (1860–1947), American poet

== Given name ==
- Pruitt Taylor Vince (born 1960), American character actor

== Other ==
- Pruitt–Igoe, a former public housing complex in St. Louis.
