= Cicero Washington Pruitt =

American missionary

Cicero Washington Pruitt (1857–1946) was among the first Southern Baptist missionaries to Northern China. He was born in Barrettsville, Georgia, on January 31, 1857, the son of John Wesley and Hannah (Rodgers) Pruitt. He was ordained as a Southern Baptist minister at the age of 14 and began his evangelical work by preaching to Native Americans in Georgia. Later he attended the Southern Baptist Theological Seminary in Louisville, Kentucky. He appears to have followed the ideals of Hudson Taylor's China Inland Mission, dressing like the Chinese, learning the language and following Chinese customs. The Pruitt family has many pictures extent of him, dressed in Chinese garb.

== Mission to North China ==
In January 1882, he traveled to China as a missionary and was stationed in Huangxian in North China, where he met his first wife, Ida Tiffany; she died two years later. Later he married Anna Seward Pruitt and they opened a school for boys that subsequently merged with the Carter School for Girls and Bush Theological Seminary, and became the North China Baptist College.

C.W. and Ann Seward along with William and Effie Sears and Laura Barton were the only missionaries that remained loyal to Lottie Moon during a doctrinal dispute with Tarleton Perry Crawford that led to dividing the Southern Baptist North China Mission. T.P. Crawford believed missionaries should be self-supporting, but received criticism for spending excessive amounts of time in subsequent business ventures. Crawford brought along most of the North China Southern Baptist missionaries in starting his own mission named Gospel Mission.

== Achievements and later years ==
C.W. considered his greatest achievement to be the translation of his influential teacher John Broadus' Commentary on Gospel of Matthew from English into Chinese. C.W. and Anna Seward were the parents of Ida Pruitt, an influential writer involved in Chinese financial aid and development. Anna Seward and C.W. retired from China missions in 1936 and C.W. at that time because the Dean of Baptist Foreign Mission of North America.

C.W. died on December 27, 1946.

== See also ==
- Southern Baptist Convention
- List of Southern Baptist Convention affiliated people
- Anna Seward Pruitt
- Ida Pruitt (daughter)
- Lottie Moon
