= Tennessee House of Representatives 58th district =

State legislative district in Tennessee

Tennessee's 58th State House of Representatives district
- Map of Tennessee House districts with the 58th District shaded in red
Representative
Harold M. Love Jr. D–Nashville
- Demographics: 31.9% White; 52.3% Black; 8.9% Hispanic; 1.7% Asian; 0.8% Other; 4.3% Multiracial
- Population (2024): 75,873

The Tennessee House of Representatives 58th district is one of 99 legislative districts in the Tennessee House of Representatives. The district represents areas of central and northern Nashville, including Tennessee State University and Fisk University. It has been represented by Democrat Harold M. Love Jr. since 2013.

== Demographics ==
The Tennessee Comptroller estimates the population as of 2024 at 75,873. The district's average household income is lower than state averages. The poverty rate is notably high, at 26.9%, nearly double that of the Tennessee average of 13.8%.

- 52.3% of the district is African American
- 31.9% of the district is White
- 8.9% of the district is Hispanic
- 1.7% of the district is Asian
- 0.8% of the district is some other race
- 4.3% of the district is Two or more races

Detailed demographic information is also available through Census Reporter.

== List of representatives ==
Representative	Party	Years of service	General Assembly	Residence
Harold M. Love Jr.	Democratic	2013–present	108th-114th	Nashville
Mary Pruitt	Democratic	1985–2012	94th-107th	Nashville
Charles J. Walker *	Democratic	1985	94th	Nashville
Charles Pruitt	Democratic	1971–1985	87th-94th	Nashville

- Charles Pruitt died in office August 5, 1985. Charles J. Walker was appointed by the Nashville Metro Council to take his place until a special election was held October 15, 1985, which his widow Mary Pruitt won.

== Electoral history ==
=== 2024 ===
2024 Tennessee House of Representatives election, District 58
Party	Candidate	Votes	%
Democratic	Harold M. Love Jr. (incumbent)	19,027	100.00
Total votes		19,027	100.00

=== 2022 ===
2022 Tennessee House of Representatives election, District 58
Party	Candidate	Votes	%
Democratic	Harold M. Love Jr. (incumbent)	10,426	96.75
Write-in		350	3.25
Total votes		10,776	100.00

=== 2020 ===
2020 Tennessee House of Representatives election, District 58
Party	Candidate	Votes	%
Democratic	Harold M. Love Jr. (incumbent)	23,839	100.00
Total votes		23,839	100.00

=== 2018 ===
2018 Tennessee House of Representatives election, District 58
Party	Candidate	Votes	%
Democratic	Harold M. Love Jr. (incumbent)	16,935	100.00
Total votes		16,935	100.00

=== 2016 ===
2016 Tennessee House of Representatives election, District 58
Party	Candidate	Votes	%
Democratic	Harold M. Love Jr. (incumbent)	15,901	100.00
Total votes		15,901	100.00

=== 2014 ===
2014 Tennessee House of Representatives election, District 58
Party	Candidate	Votes	%
Democratic	Harold M. Love Jr. (incumbent)	7,733	100.00
Total votes		7,733	100.00

=== 2012 ===
2012 Tennessee House of Representatives election, District 58
Party	Candidate	Votes	%
Democratic	Harold M. Love Jr.	16,195	98.8
Write-in		198	1.2
Total votes		16,393	100.00

=== 2010 ===
2010 Tennessee House of Representatives election, District 58
Party	Candidate	Votes	%
Democratic	Mary Pruitt (incumbent)	7,653	100.00
Total votes		7,653	100.00

=== 2008 ===
2008 Tennessee House of Representatives election, District 58
Party	Candidate	Votes	%
Democratic	Mary Pruitt (incumbent)	14,742	84.54
Independent	Lisa Leeds	2,695	15.46
Total votes		17,437	100.00

=== 2006 ===
2006 Tennessee House of Representatives election, District 58
Party	Candidate	Votes	%
Democratic	Mary Pruitt (incumbent)	8,113	84.13
Republican	Jim Boyd	1,530	15.87
Total votes		9,643	100.00

=== 2004 ===
2004 Tennessee House of Representatives election, District 58
Party	Candidate	Votes	%
Democratic	Mary Pruitt (incumbent)	14,134	100.00
Total votes		14,134	100.00

=== 2002 ===
2002 Tennessee House of Representatives election, District 58
Party	Candidate	Votes	%
Democratic	Mary Pruitt (incumbent)	7,632	100.00
Total votes		7,632	100.00

=== 2000 ===
2000 Tennessee House of Representatives election, District 58
Party	Candidate	Votes	%
Democratic	Mary Pruitt (incumbent)	10,325	100.00
Total votes		10,325	100.00
