= Oreana =

Oreana may refer to:

- Oreana (moth), a genus of moth
- Oreana, Idaho
- Oreana, Illinois
- Oreana, Nevada
- Oreana Peak, in Nevada

== See also ==
- Oriana (disambiguation)
