= Tarleton Perry Crawford =

American missionary

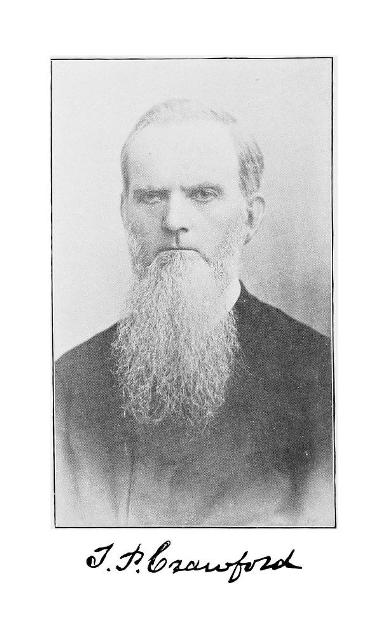
- Born: May 8, 1821; Warren County, Kentucky, U.S.
- Died: April 7, 1902 (aged 80–81); Dawson, Georgia
- Education: Union University (B.A.); University of Richmond (PhD)
- Occupations: Writer, missionary
- Spouse: Martha Foster Crawford (m. 1851)
- Writing career
- Language: English, Shanghainese, Mandarin Chinese
- Years active: 1852-1902
- Genres: Missionary work, linguistics
- Notable works: 文學書官話 [Mandarin Grammar] 配音書 [Phonetic system of writing the Tengchow Mandarin]

Chinese name
- Chinese: 高第丕
Transcriptions
Standard Mandarin
- Hanyu Pinyin: Gāo Dìpī
- Bopomofo: ㄍㄠ ㄉㄧˋ ㄆㄧ
- Wade–Giles: Kao^{1} Ti^{4}-P'i^{1}

Tarleton Perry Crawford (May 8, 1821 – April 7, 1902) was a linguist and Baptist missionary to Shandong, China, living there for 50 years with his wife, Martha Foster Crawford.

== Early life and education ==
Crawford was born in Warren County, Kentucky. He was the fourth son of John and Lucretia Crawford, who were Baptists. He had a believer's baptism at the age of sixteen. Later he said: "I will spend my life in telling of Jesus' great mercy." He dedicated his life to mission work in China.

At the beginning of 1848 he entered Union University in Murfreesboro, Tennessee, where his studies were supported in part by the West Tennessee Baptist Convention. He graduated in 1851 at the head of his class. In 1879, Crawford would receive an honorary doctorate in divinity from the University of Richmond.

Crawford worked on a farm in Denmark, Tennessee to help pay for his early education. He attended the Denmark Male Academy where he was top of his class. The Big Hatchie Baptist Association helped pay his way to Union University. The women of Browns Creek, Big Black Creek, Maple Springs and Clover Creek Baptist churches all sold their eggs and milk gathered on Sundays to help support him, and later Lottie Moon. He was first ordained by the Big Black Creek Baptist Church in Denmark, Tennessee. Brother Obediah Dodson was his pastor and was very passionate about missions.

== Marriage and family ==
Crawford married fellow Baptist Martha Foster. They married on March 12, 1851, at her home in Tuscaloosa County, Alabama, a week after their engagement.

== Career ==
At the close of 1850 Crawford was appointed as missionary to Shanghai, China by the Foreign Mission Board of the Southern Baptist Convention. After marrying his wife in 1851, they sailed to Hong Kong after a 102-day trip, arriving in February 1852, before finally reaching Shanghai in March 1853. Crawford would then work with multiple local missionaries, including Joseph Edkins, to document the phonology of Shanghainese. He had immediately bore witness to a scandal involving missionaries bribing Chinese nationals into distributing Bibles in rural areas considered dangerous for non-Chinese to go; this had led to a scam where the Chinese nationals were selling the books to the printer, which would be returned, allowing for false reports of thousands of sales. This prompted Crawford to learn the local language, Shanghainese, to more rigorously engage in his missionary activities.

Sometime after arriving in Shanghai, building on a romanised script produced by Rev. Dr. Taylor deemed inadequate for articulating Shanghainese phonology, Crawford would publish a phonetic script for the language. This script was widely used amongst missionaries in translating religious materials into Shanghainese, including some produced by himself and his wife, and several books were written in it by 1885. However, it fell into obscurity several decades later. Examples of translated materials include The Lord's Prayer, Aesop's Fables, Gospel of Luke, and The Sources of Good and Evil. He also composed some of his own hymns. Outside of his linguistic work, Crawford would work in schools, invest in Shanghai, and preach the gospel in his free time; he was known to preach for three to eight hours a day. Reports imply Crawford had bribed girls into attending a girls' school. During this period, Crawford experienced troubles with the Taiping Rebellion and outbreaks of cholera.

Crawford had a domineering character that caused much dissent; some Americans were concerned and he was rebuked by the American consul in Shanghai; however, an 1892 source claimed this was due to ill health. Due to this, Crawford and his wife moved to Penglai, Shandong province. Crawford would go on to publish among the earliest European documentations of Mandarin Chinese grammar in 1869, which would go on to be translated into Japanese and become a crucial source of information on the subject. Crawford would diverge from orthodox Latin-based interpretations of grammar systems common at the time and instead invent terms within and specifically for Chinese, some of which remain in use today. It would sell well amongst Chinese nationals, who used it in their curriculum. Thereafter, Crawford would document the earliest-known phonology of the variety spoken in Shandong—a form of Jiaoliao Mandarin—producing a phonetic script for the language based on one he made in Shanghai. However, the script would see little use outside of a local method of phonologically describing Mandarin in Shandong schools. The Shanghai and Dengzhou scripts would be used to produce a theoretically "universal" set of phonetic characters for Chinese varieties in 1888, with Crawford decrying Han characters as being inadequate and "doomed to antiquity". These would see mixed responses within The Chinese Recorder and Missionary Journal, with criticisms largely centring around the homophony within the Chinese language system.

Crawford insisted that preaching was the sole duty of the missionary. He was dismayed by the fiasco involving Charles Gutzlaff's Chinese evangelists. He thereafter insisted that the Chinese should never be paid out of mission funds. His friend Dr. George Burton's becoming exhausted due to excessive medical work in Shanghai reinforced Crawford's central conviction. Crawford itinerated widely around local villages (131 in 1875 alone). His singlemindedness meant that he closed down his wife's school in 1879, perhaps out of jealousy at her success with Lottie Moon at Shaling.

He continued to criticize the mission board of the American Southern Baptist Mission, which he thought should have no say on mission matters. They disagreed and removed him in 1892.

In 1890, Crawford formed the Gospel Mission Association of North China, and eight (of fourteen) Southern Baptist missionaries joined him. By the turn of the century, the mission had grown to nineteen. All the Gospel missioners wore Chinese clothing, lived in Chinese houses, and solely preached the gospel. This was similar to the practices of the missionaries of the China Inland Mission. Southern Baptist Convention missionaries struggled with Crawford's "unattractive social philosophy and his refusal to give sensible leadership to the Christian Chinese." (Hyatt, 1976:59)

Martha Crawford remained loyal to her husband, although she disagreed with several of his views. In 1867 she formed a boys' school in their home. Several of the students went on to become pastors at the successful Huangxian and Pingdu stations. She also wrote The Three Maidens, a book for children, which was subsequently widely used throughout China. At the Second Missionary Conference (1877), she spoke on "Women's Work for Women", stressing missionary wives should visit house-to-house, personally instruct local women, and prepare suitable literature for them.

In his book The Patriarchal Dynasties, Crawford announced his conviction that in 1876 the world was 14,376 years old. He believed that the Garden of Eden was a theocratic confederacy, with a potential population of 1,174,405,120- though he concedes that the actual number "doubtless fell far below" this figure.

== Publications ==
- Crawford, T.P. (1852). Chinese Immigration to the U.S. in Tennessee Baptist, January 8, 1853, p. 3. Shanghai. https://baptisthistoryhomepage.com/crawford.t.p.china.immigration.1852.html
- Crawford, T.P. (1853). Communications in Tennessee Baptist, April 23, 1853, p. 1. Shanghai. https://baptisthistoryhomepage.com/crawford.t.p.letter.1853.html
- Crawford, T. P. (1855). 上海土音寫法 [Zaonhe Thuin Shiafaq]. American Presbyterian Mission Press. https://digital.bodleian.ox.ac.uk/objects/88120fcb-b461-4ec3-9783-c47555c7b05f/surfaces/de52734d-3895-46b8-a1cc-4b0068adae76/
- Crawford, T. P. (1858). 聖經記略. 第二本 [Bible Stories 2] (Vol. 2). American Presbyterian Mission Press. https://digital.bodleian.ox.ac.uk/objects/68e1c4fb-d204-4fca-991e-0c20c5590e55/surfaces/afd8ef63-a504-41a5-8ea3-9ce692ad01fb/
- Crawford, T. P. (1858). 聖經記略. 第三本 [Bible Stories 3] (Vol. 3). American Presbyterian Mission Press. https://digital.bodleian.ox.ac.uk/objects/37e89dbd-7485-4781-aef9-27342fb22078/surfaces/656feb51-2ff8-4739-a7d0-4d576c0f698c/
- Crawford T. P. (1869). 文學書官話 [Mandarin Grammar] (Zhang R., Trans.). American Presbyterian Mission Press. https://taiwanebook.ncl.edu.tw/zh-tw/book/NCL-003890150/reader
- Crawford, T. P. (1870). Letter from Tung-Chow to the Editor of the Chinese Recorder. The Chinese Recorder and Missionary Journal, 3(1), 25. https://books.google.no/books?id=PcELAAAAYAAJ&pg=PA25
- Crawford, T. P. (1871). The Time of our Saviour's Crucifixion and Resurrection. The Chinese Recorder and Missionary Journal, 4(10), 257.
- Crawford, T. P. (1872). 配音書 [Phonetic system of writing the Tengchow Mandarin]. American Presbyterian Mission Press. https://digital.bodleian.ox.ac.uk/objects/620e89d6-d719-4d60-8c0b-e9631de2e312/
- Crawford, T.P. (1877). The patriarchal dynasties from Adam to Abraham, shown to cover 10,500 years, and the highest human life only 187. Richmond, VA: Joseph Ryland & Co. https://archive.org/details/patriarchaldynas00crawrich/
- Crawford, T. P. (1888). A System of Phonetic Symbols for writing the Dialects of China. The Chinese Recorder and Missionary Journal, 19(3), 101–110.
- Crawford, T.P. (Baker, Russell P., ed.) (1892). Churches, to the Front! in A Baptist Source Book. https://baptisthistoryhomepage.com/crawford.t.p.churchs.frnt.html

== See also ==
- C.W. Pruitt
- Anna Seward Pruitt
