= Prewett =

Prewett is a surname. Notable people with the surname include:

- Prewett family, fictional characters in J. K. Rowling's Harry Potter series
  - Gideon and Fabian Prewett, Molly Weasley's brothers
- Frank Prewett (1893–1962), Canadian poet, who spent most of his life in the United Kingdom
- Park Prewett Hospital, psychiatric hospital northwest of Basingstoke, England, which operated from 1917 until 1997

== See also ==
- Prue Watt
- Pruett
