= Oriana (disambiguation) =

Oriana or Oriane is a female name.

It may also refer to:

- ST Oriana, a tug sunk in 1948
- SS Oriana (1959), a 1959-built ocean liner
- MV Oriana (1994), a 1995-built cruise ship
- Orania, Northern Cape, an Afrikaner community in South Africa.
- Oreana, Illinois, a village in the United States
- Oriana Cinema, an art-deco building in Fremantle, Western Australia, demolished in 1972
- Oriana (film), a 1985 film by Fina Torres
- Oriana (grape), another name for the Italian wine grape Uva Rara
- Oriana (horse), a British Thoroughbred racehorse, foaled 1807
- "Oriana (September 24, 1988)", a song by Al Di Meola from Kiss My Axe
- Oriana, a 19th-century play by James Albery
- Oriana, Windows software for circular statistics/orientation analysis
- Oriane Ou la Cinquième Couleur, a 2002 novel by Paul-Loup Sulitzer
- Oriane, a fictional character in the novel Labyrinth by Kate Mosse.
- Orianna, the Lady of Clockwork, a playable champion character in the multiplayer online battle arena video game League of Legends
- The Triumphs of Oriana, a 1601 book of madrigals by Thomas Morley

== People ==
- Orianna Andrews, American medical doctor
- Oriana Fallaci, Italian journalist and author
- Orianna Santunione, Italian operatic soprano
