= Martha Foster Crawford =

American writer and missionary

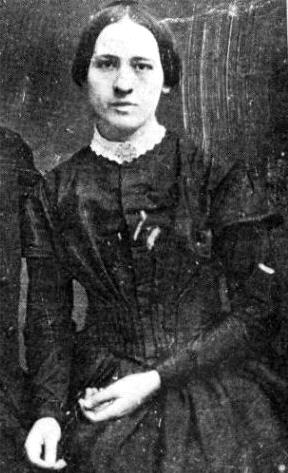
- Born: Martha Elizabeth Foster; January 28, 1830; Jasper County, Georgia, U.S.
- Died: 1909 (aged 78–79); Liaoning, China
- Education: Messopotamia Girls' Seminary, Eutaw, Alabama
- Occupations: Writer, missionary
- Spouse: Tarleton Perry Crawford (m. 1851)
- Writing career
- Language: English
- Genre: missionary

Martha Foster Crawford (January 28, 1830 -1909) was an American writer and missionary to China (1852–1909). She was the first foreign missionary from Alabama. Her parents were the deacon, John Lovelace Savidge Foster, and Susanna Hollifield Foster. In 1851, shortly before she became a missionary to China, she married Tarleton Perry Crawford, whom she had known for three weeks. They arrived in Shanghai in March 1852. During their marriage, they adopted two children.

Crawford wrote several books and diaries. Zao yang fan shu (造洋飯書,Foreign Cookery in Chinese; 1866) was the first Chinese-language Western cookbook published in Shanghai.

== Early years and education ==
Martha Elizabeth Foster was born in Jasper County, Georgia, January 28, 1830. She was one of ten children, six boys and four girls. While a child, the family removed to Tuscaloosa, Alabama. She was educated in the common schools and Mesopotamia Girls' Seminary at Eutaw, Alabama. She prepared herself for the occupation of schoolteacher. At the age of 15, she had a believer's baptism, having been the child of a deeply religious family of Baptist faith.

== Career ==
=== Missionary ===
At 19 years of age, Foster expressed a great desire to become a foreign missionary. About this time, one Tarlton P. Crawford went to Richmond, Virginia, to be examined and secure appointment by missionary board to serve in foreign fields. He expressed a desire to find and marry some woman who wanted to be a missionary. The next day, the secretary received a letter asking the board to appoint Miss Foster to Chinese missionary work. The secretary showed the letter to Mr. Crawford. He set out at once to find the young lady. He found her teaching in a neighboring village, boarding at the village hotel, kept by a Baptist, who introduced the two. In three weeks, they were married. Before leaving for China, they visited 50 churches of the Baptist association, upon which they depended for support.

Mr. Crawford was appointed by the F. M. B. of the Southern Baptist Convention in 1851 a missionary to Shanghai. They sailed from New York, November 17, 1851, via Cape of Good Hope, arriving March 30, 1852. After a rough passage, they landed in Hong Kong in 102 days. From there, they proceeded up the coast of China to Shanghai, by schooner, in 17 days. The mission board bore all expenses. At the end of 12 years, the Crawfords went into Shandong province. They labored there for 30 years with two other missionaries. In 1893, they went to Tai'an at the foot of Mount Tai.

Dr. Crawford spent nearly twelve years in Shanghai from the time of arrival, but their health became much impaired there, and so they moved to Tengzhou, Shandong, among the early settlers there. After spending thirty years there, and becoming convinced that Baptists could work more efficiently by putting more direct responsibility upon, the local churches instead of making them merely contributors to a Central Board, he with several others moved to the west of the province, in 1894, to Tai'an, where he was laboring when the Boxer troubles arose.

They returned to the U. S. in the autumn of 1900, after finding that they could not soon return to the interior, but their hearts were much in China, and they did so long to return to die in the land for which they had given their lives; and they had planned to be on the return sea voyage just at the time Mr. Crawford died. This was his fifth and her third visit to the U. S. during the fifty years they spent as missionaries.

=== Writer ===
Crawford wrote several books and diaries. Zao yang fan shu (Foreign Cookery in Chinese; 1866) was the first Chinese-language Western cookbook published in Shanghai.

== Selected works ==
- 18??, Shan-Tung province : our North-China mission field
- Martha Foster Crawford diaries, 1846-1881
- 1866, 造洋飯書. Zao yang fan shu
- 1872, A story of three little girls
- 1883, Discouragements and encouragements of the missionary situation in China : an excellent work for distribution by mission societies
- 1888, A call to north China
