= Ida Pruitt =

American social worker

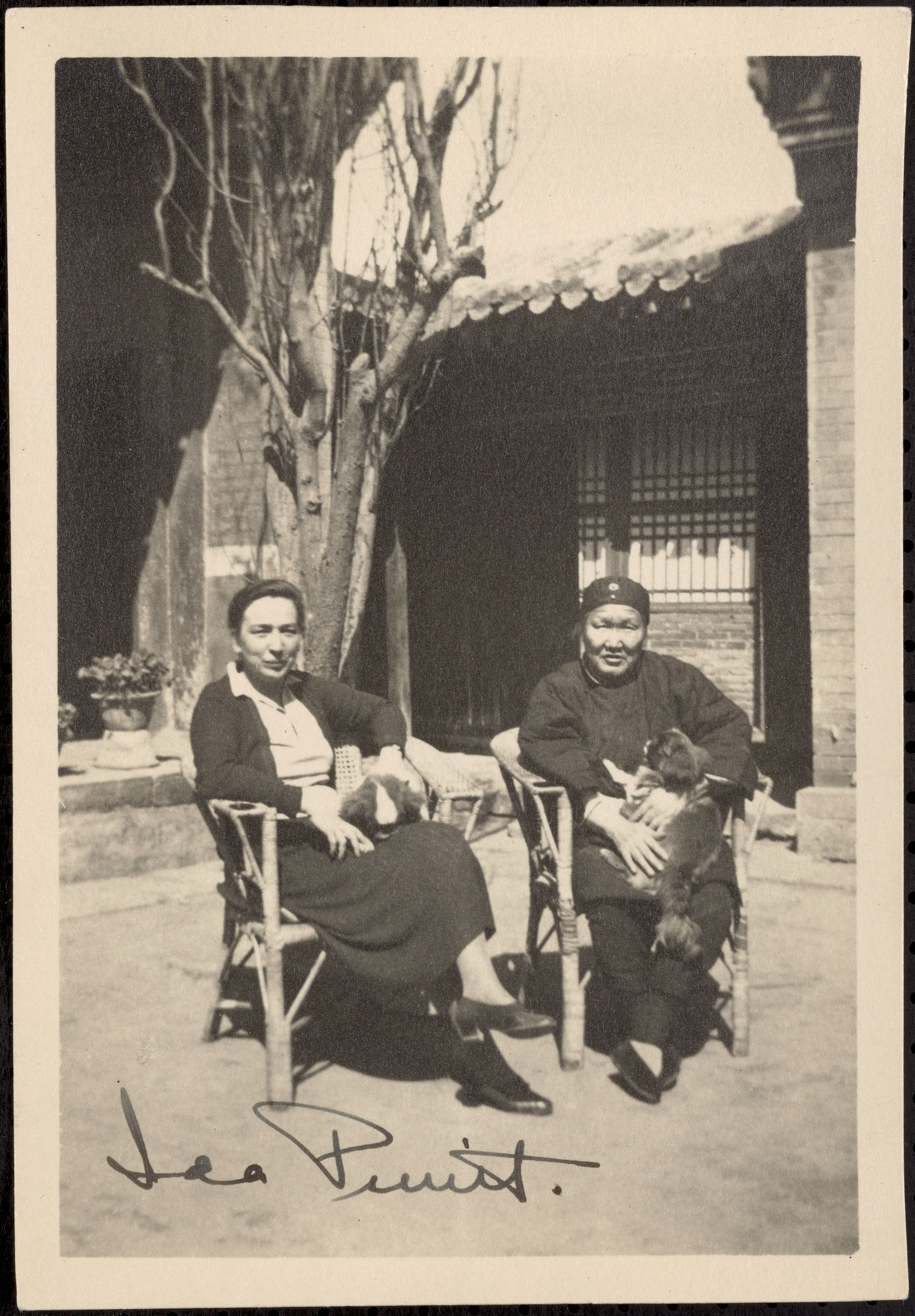
Ida Pruitt sitting with woman and two dogs, by an unknown photographer, 1935-1938. Judging by photographs in that book, the woman is evidently Ning Lao T'ai T'ai, whose as-told-to-Pruitt autobiography "A Daughter of Han" shows Ning sitting with Pruitt in similar clothing.

Ida C. Pruitt (1888–1985) was a China-born American social worker, author, speaker, interpreter and activist in Sino-American understanding. Her biographer called her "China's American Daughter." In the 1920s and 1930s she supervised social work in the Peking Union Medical College, then after the outbreak of the Second Sino-Japanese War was a major actor in the Chinese Industrial Cooperatives. After the Chinese Communist Revolution of 1949, she retired to the United States but continued to advocate warmer relations with China.

== Early life ==
Ida Pruitt was the daughter of North China Southern Baptist missionaries Anna Seward Pruitt and C.W. Pruitt. Born in 1888 in the coastal town of Penglai on the Shandong peninsula, her childhood was spent in the small inland village of Songjia, Shandong, where for many years the Pruitts were the only Western family.

After attending Cox College in College Park, Georgia (1906–1909), Ida Pruitt received a B.S. from Columbia University Teachers' College in New York City (1910). When her brother John died, Ida returned to China to be with her family and became a teacher and principal of Wai Ling School for Girls in Chefoo (1912–1918). In 1918, she came back to the United States and studied social work in Boston and Philadelphia until hired by the Rockefeller Foundation in New York as head of the Department of Social Services at the Peking Union Medical College (PUMC) where she remained until 1938.

== Japanese occupation ==
During the Japanese occupation of China (1937–1945), Ida assisted Rewi Alley as he organized the Chinese Industrial Cooperatives. The CIC was formed to organize cooperative factories throughout the countryside to support China's industry. Schools were built to train the Chinese (often crippled or orphaned) to work in and manage the factories. Indusco, the fundraising arm of the CIC in the United States, was formed, and Pruitt served as its executive secretary from 1939 to 1951.

== Author ==
Pruitt wrote books, stories, and articles, including several autobiographies and biographies including;

A China Childhood (1978), The Years Between, and Days in Old Peking: May 1921 - October 1938. Her "as told to" autobiography - Daughter of Han: The Autobiography of a Chinese Working Woman (1945) became widely read when it was republished in paperback by Stanford University Press in 1967. This book was followed by Old Madame Yin: A Memoir of Peking Life, 1926–1938 (1979), and Tales of Old China.

She also translated and edited many works, including Yellow Storm (better known as Four Generations Under One Roof) by Lao She (1951), The Flight of an Empress by Wu Yung (1936), Little Bride by Wang Yung, and Beyond China's City Walls by George A. Hogg, et al.

== Personal life ==
In 1946, she rented an apartment with Maud Russell on West 93rd Street in New York City and remained there until 1961 when she retired and moved to Philadelphia near the University of Pennsylvania where she remained for the rest of her life.

While living in Beijing Ida adopted two girls, one Chinese, Kueiching [Kwei-ching], the other a Russian refugee, Tania Manooiloff. They were educated in English schools in China, then sent to the United States. Kueiching married Tommy Ho, a radiologist from Canada, in 1940; they settled in Saskatchewan, Canada, and had two children: Timmy and Nancy. Her other daughter, Tania Manooiloff, taught Russian at Swarthmore College . She married Cornelius "Cornie" Cosman, a metallurgist who worked for the US Department of the Interior. They had four children: Catherine Helen, Anna Ida, Michaela and Hugh. After Cosman's death, she married Mr. Wahl.

Ida Pruitt died on July 24, 1985, in Philadelphia.

Unreferenced text mostly taken from the Radcliff Finding Aid. See link below.

== See also ==
- Anna Seward Pruitt
- C.W. Pruitt
- Lottie Moon
- Rewi Alley
- Gung Ho - industrial worker's cooperative
- 19th-century Protestant missions in China
- List of Protestant missionaries in China
- Christianity in China
