= Shanghainese =

Wu Chinese variety spoken in Shanghai

- 上海闲话; 上海閒話, zaon-he ghe-gho 沪语; 滬語, wu-gniu
- Pronunciation: [zɑ̃̀hɛ́ ɦɛ̀ɦó], [ɦùɲý]
- Native to: China
- Region: Shanghai, Nantong (urban variety traditionally in the urban center of Shanghai)
- Ethnicity: Shanghainese
- Speakers: 15.86 million (including bendihua) (2012)
- Language family: Sino-Tibetan: Sinitic; Chinese; Wu; Taihu/Northern; Su–Hu–Jia / Shanghai; Shanghainese
- Writing system: Chinese characters

Language codes
- ISO 639-3: –
- ISO 639-6: suji
- Glottolog: shan1293 Shanghainese
- Linguasphere: 79-AAA-dbb

Shanghainese
- Traditional Chinese: 上海話
- Simplified Chinese: 上海话
- Wugniu: ^{6}zaon-he-gho
- Literal meaning: Shanghai language
Transcriptions
Standard Mandarin
- Hanyu Pinyin: Shànghǎihuà
Wu
- Wugniu: ^{6}zaon-he-gho
Yue: Cantonese
- Yale Romanization: Seuhnghóiwá
- Jyutping: soeng^{6} hoi^{2} waa^{6}-^{2}

Shanghainese
- Traditional Chinese: 上海閒話
- Simplified Chinese: 上海闲话
- Wugniu: ^{6}zaon-he ^{6}ghe-gho; ^{6}zaon-he-ghe-gho
- Literal meaning: Shanghai speech
Transcriptions
Wu
- Wugniu: ^{6}zaon-he ^{6}ghe-gho; ^{6}zaon-he-ghe-gho
- IPA: [zɑ̃̀hɛ́ ɦɛ̀ɦò]

Hu language
- Traditional Chinese: 滬語
- Simplified Chinese: 沪语
- Wugniu: ^{6}wu-gniu
- Literal meaning: Hu (Shanghai) language
Transcriptions
Standard Mandarin
- Hanyu Pinyin: Hùyǔ
Wu
- Wugniu: ^{6}wu-gniu
- IPA: [ɦùȵỳ]
Yue: Cantonese
- Jyutping: wu^{6} jyu^{5}

A woman speaking Shanghainese.

The Shanghainese language, also known as the Shanghai dialect, or Hu language, is a variety of Wu Chinese spoken in the central districts of the city of Shanghai and its surrounding areas. It is classified as part of the Sino-Tibetan language family. Shanghainese, like the rest of the Wu language group, is mutually unintelligible with other varieties of Chinese, such as Mandarin.

Shanghainese belongs to a separate group of the Taihu Wu subgroup. With nearly 14 million speakers, Shanghainese is also the largest single form of Wu Chinese. Since the late 19th century, it has served as the lingua franca of the entire Yangtze River Delta region, but in recent decades its status has declined relative to Mandarin, which most Shanghainese speakers can also speak.

Like other Wu varieties, Shanghainese is rich in vowels and consonants, with around twenty unique vowel qualities, twelve of which are phonemic. Similarly, Shanghainese also has voiced obstruent initials, which is rare outside of Wu and Xiang varieties. Shanghainese also has a low number of tones compared to other languages in Southern China and has a system of tone sandhi similar to Japanese pitch accent.

== History ==
The speech of Shanghai had long been influenced by those dialects spoken about Jiaxing and Suzhou. Suzhounese literature, Chuanqi, Tanci, and folk songs all influenced early Shanghainese.

During the 1850s, the port of Shanghai was opened, and a large number of migrants, particularly from Ningbo and the Jianghuai area, entered the city. Around this time, missionaries such as Joseph Edkins and Tarleton Perry Crawford would document the phonology of the language. This led to many loanwords from both the West and the East, especially from Ningbonese, and like Cantonese in Hong Kong, English. In fact, "speakers of other Wu dialects traditionally treat the Shanghai vernacular somewhat contemptuously as a mixture of Suzhou and Ningbo dialects." This has led to Shanghainese becoming one of the fastest-developing languages of the Wu Chinese subgroup, undergoing rapid changes and quickly replacing Suzhounese as the prestige dialect of the Yangtze River Delta region. It underwent sustained growth that reached a peak in the 1930s during the Republican era, when migrants arrived in Shanghai and immersed themselves in the local tongue. Migrants from Shanghai also brought Shanghainese to many overseas Chinese communities. As of 2016, 83,400 people in Hong Kong are still able to speak Shanghainese. Shanghainese is sometimes viewed as a tool to discriminate against immigrants. Migrants who move from other Chinese cities to Shanghai have little ability to speak Shanghainese. Among the migrant people, some believe Shanghainese represents the superiority of native Shanghainese people. Some also believe that native residents intentionally speak Shanghainese in some places to discriminate against the immigrant population to transfer their anger to migrant workers, who take over their homeland and take advantage of housing, education, medical, and job resources.

After the People's Republic of China's government imposed and promoted Standard Chinese as the official language of all of China, Shanghainese had started its decline. During the reform and opening up of 1978, Shanghai has once again taken in a large number of migrants. Due to the prominence of Standard Mandarin, learning Shanghainese was no longer necessary for migrants. However, Shanghainese remained a vital part of the city's culture and retained its prestige status within the local population. In the 1990s, it was still common for local radio and television broadcasts to be in Shanghainese. For example, in 1995, the TV series Sinful Debt featured extensive Shanghainese dialogue; when it was broadcast outside Shanghai (mainly in adjacent Wu-speaking areas) Mandarin subtitles were added. The Shanghainese TV series Lao Niang Jiu (老娘舅, "Old Uncle") was broadcast from 1995 to 2007; it was popular among Shanghainese residents. Shanghainese programming has since slowly declined amid regionalist-localist accusations. From 1992 onward, Shanghainese use was discouraged in schools, and many children native to Shanghai can no longer speak Shanghainese. In addition, Shanghai's emergence as a cosmopolitan global city consolidated the status of Mandarin as the standard language of business and services, at the expense of the local language.

Since 2005, movements to protect Shanghainese have emerged. At municipal legislative discussions in 2005, former Shanghai opera actress Ma Lili moved to "protect" the language, stating that she was one of the few remaining Shanghai opera actresses who still retained authentic classic Shanghainese pronunciation in their performances. Shanghai's former party boss Chen Liangyu, a native Shanghainese himself, reportedly supported her proposal. Shanghainese has been reintegrated into pre-kindergarten education, with education of native folk songs and rhymes, as well as a Shanghainese-only day on Fridays in the Modern Baby Kindergarten. Professor Qian Nairong, linguist and head of the Chinese Department at Shanghai University, is working on efforts to save the language. In response to criticism, Qian reminds people that Shanghainese was once fashionable, saying, "the popularization of Mandarin doesn't equal the ban of dialects. It doesn't make Mandarin a more civilized language either. Promoting dialects is not a narrow-minded localism, as it has been labeled by some netizens". Qian has also urged for Shanghainese to be taught in other sectors of education, due to kindergarten and university courses being insufficient.

During the 2010s, many achievements have been made to preserve Shanghainese. In 2011, Hu Baotan wrote Longtang (弄堂, "Longtang"), the first ever Shanghainese novel. In June 2012, a new television program airing in Shanghainese was created. In 2013, buses in Shanghai started using Shanghainese broadcasts. In 2017, Apple's iOS 11 introduced Siri in Shanghainese, being only the third Sinitic language to be supported, after Standard Mandarin and Cantonese. In 2018, the Japanese-Chinese animated anthology drama film Flavors of Youth had a section set in Shanghai, with significant Shanghainese dialogue. In January 2019, singer Lin Bao released the first Shanghainese pop record Shanghai Yao (上海谣; 上海謠, "Shanghai Ballad"). In December 2021, the Shanghainese-language romantic comedy movie Myth of Love (爱情神话; 愛情神話) was released. Its box office revenue was ¥260 million, and response was generally positive. Similarly, in December 2023, the TV show Blossoms Shanghai (繁花) aired with the primary language being Shanghainese.

Today, around half the population of Shanghai can converse in Shanghainese, and a further quarter can understand it. Though the number of speakers has been declining, a large number of people want to preserve it.

== Status ==
Due to the large number of ethnic groups of China, efforts to establish a common language have been attempted many times. Therefore, the language issue has always been an important part of Beijing's rule. Other than the government language-management efforts, the rate of rural-to-urban migration in China has also accelerated the shift to Standard Chinese and the disappearance of native languages and dialects in the urban areas.

As more people moved into Shanghai, the economic center of China, Shanghainese has been threatened despite it originally being a strong topolect of Wu Chinese. According to the Shanghai Municipal Statistics Bureau, the population of Shanghai was estimated to be 24.28 million in 2019, of whom 14.5 million are permanent residents and 9.77 million are migrant residents. To have better communication with foreign residents and develop a top-level financial center among the world, the promotion of the official language, Standard Mandarin, became very important. Therefore, the Shanghai Municipal Government banned the use of Shanghainese in public places, schools, and work. Around half of the city's population is unaware of these policies.

A survey of students from the primary school in 2010 indicated that 52.3% of students believed Mandarin is easier than Shanghainese for communication, and 47.6% of the students choose to speak Mandarin because it is a mandatory language at school. Furthermore, 68.3% of the students are more willing to study Mandarin, but only 10.2% of the students are more willing to study Shanghainese. A survey in 2021 has shown that 15.22% of respondents under 18 would never use Shanghainese. The study also found that the percentage of people that would use Shanghainese with older family members has halved. The study also shows that around one third of people under the age of 30 can only understand Shanghainese, and 8.7% of respondents under 18 cannot even understand it. The number of people that are able to speak Shanghainese has also consistently decreased.

Much of the youth can no longer speak Shanghainese fluently because they had no chance to practice it at school. Also, they were unwilling to communicate with their parents in Shanghainese, which has accelerated its decline. The survey in 2010 indicated that 62.6% of primary school students use Mandarin as the first language at home, but only 17.3% of them use Shanghainese to communicate with their parents.

However, the same study from 2021 has shown that more than 90% of all age groups except 18–29 want to preserve Shanghainese. A total of 87.06% of people have noted that the culture of Shanghai cannot live without its language as it is used as a mechanism to bring people together and create a sense of community and warmth. Moreover, around half of the respondents stated that a Shanghainese citizen should be able to speak Shanghainese. More than 85% of all participants also believe that they help Shanghainese revitalization.

== Classification ==
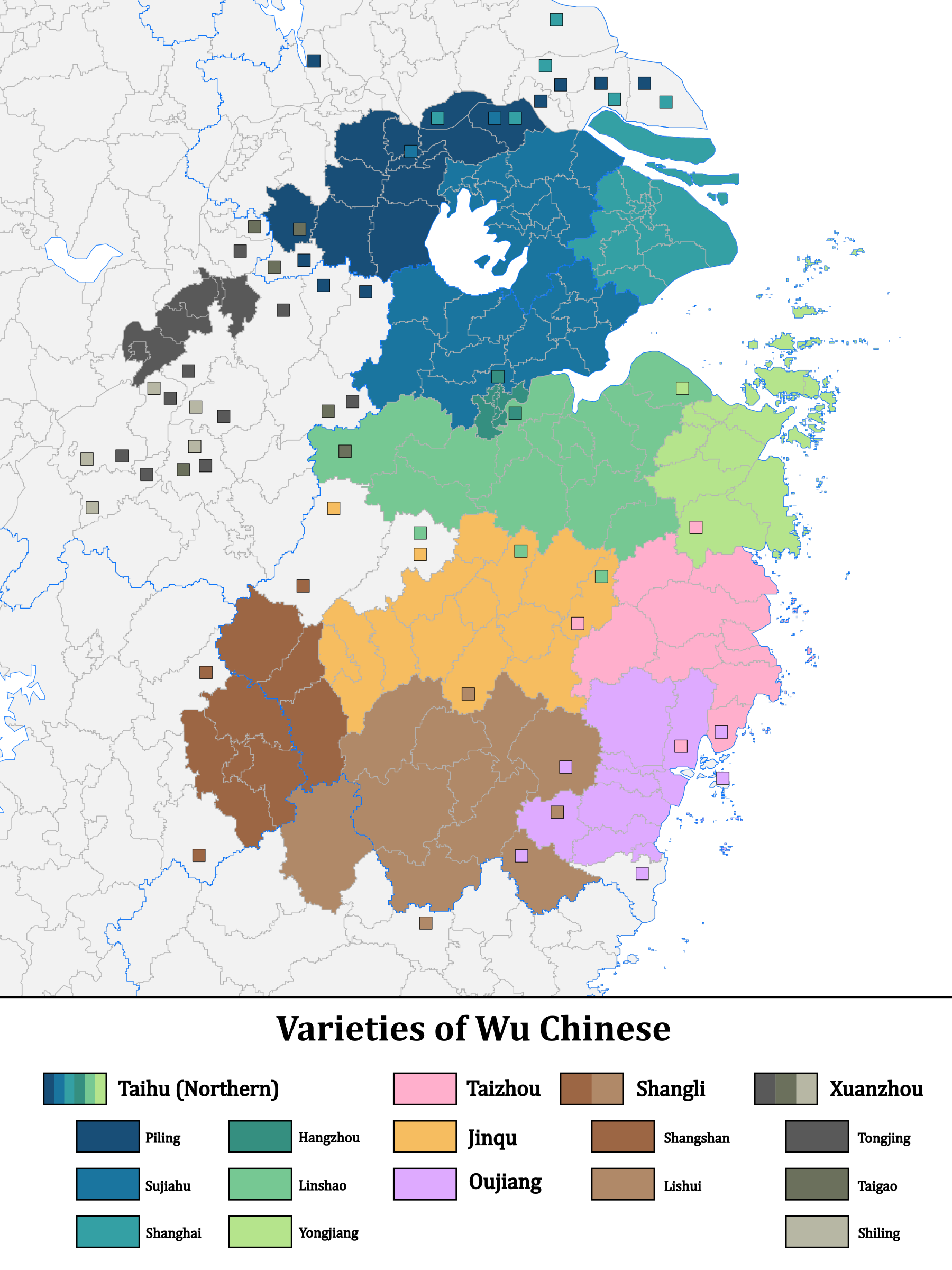
Map of Wu subgroups. The Shanghainese branch shown in blue-green.

Shanghainese macroscopically is spoken in Shanghai and parts of eastern Nantong, and constitutes the Shanghai subranch of the Northern Wu family of Wu Chinese. Some linguists group Shanghainese with nearby varieties, such as Huzhounese and Suzhounese, which has about 73% lexical similarity with Standard Mandarin, into a branch known as Suhujia (苏沪嘉小片; 蘇滬嘉小片), due to them sharing many phonological, lexical, and grammatical similarities. Newer varieties of Shanghainese, however, have been influenced by standard Chinese as well as Cantonese and other varieties, making the Shanghainese idiolects spoken by young people in the city different from that spoken by the older population. Also, the practice of inserting Mandarin into Shanghainese conversations is very common, at least for young people. It is also of note that Shanghainese, like other Northern Wu languages, is not mutually intelligible with Southern Wu languages like Wenzhounese.

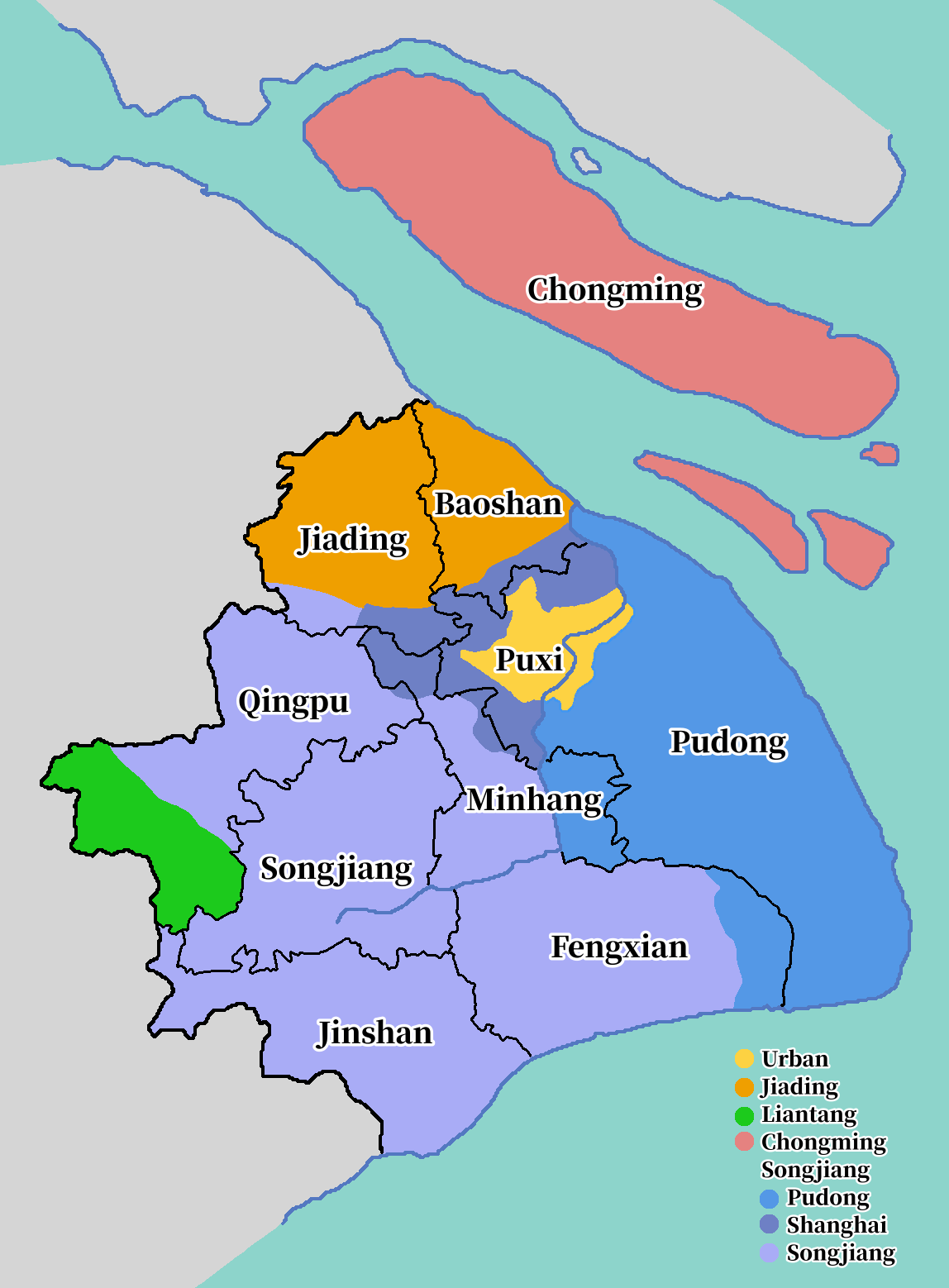
Map of the subdivisions

Shanghainese as a branch of Northern Wu can be further subdivided, based primarily on the preservation of historical tone categories:

- Urban branch (市区片; 市區片) – what "Shanghainese" tends to refer to. Occupies the city centre of Shanghai, generally on the west bank of the Huangpu River. Its speakerbase can also be further divided into Old, Middle, and New Periods, as well as an emerging Newest Period, in order of innovativity. The Middle Period is the de facto standard variety.

The following are often collectively known as Bendihua (本地话; 本地話, Shanghainese: 本地闲话; 本地閒話, Wugniu: pen-di ghe-gho)

- Jiading branch (嘉定片) – spoken in the most of Jiading and Baoshan.
- Liantang branch (练塘片; 練塘片) – spoken in the southwestern ends of Qingpu. This variety has an aspiration-conditioned tone split in the dark rising (阴上; 陰上) category, a feature also found in nearby varieties in Suzhou prefecture.
- Chongming branch (崇明片) – spoken in the islands of Hengsha, Changxing and Chongming, as well as the eastern parts of Nantong. Also instead analysed to be part of the Shadi (沙地) dialect continuum, along with varieties in nearby counties such as Haimen.
- Songjiang branch (松江片) – spoken in all other parts of Shanghai, which can be further divided into the following:

- Pudong subbranch (浦东小片; 浦東小片) – spoken in all parts of the east bank of the Huangpu River, taking up most of the Pudong district, ie. the now-defunct Chuansha and Nanhui counties.
- Shanghai subbranch (上海小片) – spoken in the rest of the peripheral areas of the city center, namely southern Jiading and Baoshan, as well as northern Minhang.
- Songjiang subbranch (松江小片) – spoken in the rest of Shanghai. Named after the Songjiang district.

The following is a comparison of lexical items in several bendihua localities, focusing on phonological differences between them.

Locality				Lexical item									
Locality				雷	來 / 来	蘭 / 兰	夾 / 夹	格	角	谷	渴	磕	克
Urban	Contemporary	上海市區	上海市区	le˨˧			kaʔ˦		koʔ˦		kʰəʔ˦		
Urban	Historical (20th c.)	上海市區	上海市区	le˩˧		lɛ˩˧	kaʔ˦ / ɡaʔ˩˨	kɑʔ˦	kɒʔ˦	koʔ˦	kʰəʔ˦		
Jiading	Jiading	嘉定縣城	嘉定县城	lø˧˩	le˧˩		kaʔ˥		kɔʔ˥	koʔ˥	kʰəʔ˥		
Jiading	Luojing	嘉定羅涇	嘉定罗泾	lʌɜ˨˧˩	lɛ˨˧˩		kaʔ˦		kɔʔ˦	koʔ˦	kʰəʔ˦		kʰəʔ˦ / kʰoʔ˦
Chongming	Chongming	崇明縣城	崇明县城	lei˨˦	ɦlɛ˨˦	ʔlæ˥ / ɦlæ˨˦	kæʔ˥	kɑʔ˥	koʔ˥		kʰəʔ˥ / kʰøʔ˥	kʰəʔ˥	
Chongming	Bao	崇明堡鎭	崇明堡镇	lei2	lɛ2	læ2	kæʔ7	kɑʔ7	koʔ7		kʰøʔ7	kʰəʔ7	
Liantang		青浦練塘	青浦练塘	lɪ˧˩	le˧˩		kaʔ˥	kɑʔ˥	kɔʔ˥	koʔ˥	kʰəʔ˥		
Pudong	Chuansha	浦東川沙	浦东川沙	le˨˩˧		lɛ˨˩˧	kæʔ˥	kaʔ˥	kɔʔ˥	koʔ˥	kʰœʔ˥	(合: ɦəʔ˨˧)	kʰʌ˥
Pudong	Nanhui	浦東南匯	浦东南汇	le˩˩˧	lɛ˩˩˧ / le˩˩˧	lɛ˩˩˧	kæʔ˥	kaʔ˥	kɔʔ˥	koʔ˥	kʰœʔ˥	(合: ɦəʔ˩˨)	kʰʌʔ˥
Pudong	Zhoupu	浦東周浦	浦东周浦	ne˩˩˧	le˩˩˧	lɛ˩˩˧	kɑʔ˥	kaʔ˥ / kəʔ˥	kɒʔ˥ / koʔ˥	(哭: kʰoʔ˥)	kʰəʔ˥		
Pudong	Gaoqiao	浦東高橋	浦东高桥	le6		lɛ2	kʌʔ7	kəʔ7	kɔʔ7	koʔ7	hʌʔ7	kʰəʔ7	
Pudong	Sanlin	浦東三林	浦东三林	le2		lɛ2	kæʔ7	kaʔ7	koʔ7	koʔ7	kʰəʔ7		kʰʌʔ7
Shanghai	Zhenru	普陀眞如	普陀真如	le˨		lɛ˨	kæʔ˥		kɔʔ˥	kuoʔ˥	kʰəʔ˥		
Shanghai	Jiangwan	江灣	江湾	le6	lɛ6		kæʔ7	kɑʔ7	kɔʔ7	koʔ7	kʰəʔ7		
Songjiang	Xinzhuang	閔行莘莊	闵行莘庄	li˧˩	le˧˩	lɛ˧˩	kæʔ˥	kʌʔ˥	kɔʔ˥	koʔ˥	kʰəʔ˦		kʰʌʔ˥
Songjiang	Minhang	閔行縣城	闵行县城	lɪⁱ2	lɛ2		kæʔ7	kəʔ7	kɔʔ7	koʔ7	kʰəʔ7		-
Songjiang	Songjiang	松江縣城	松江县城	le˧˩	lɛ˧˩		kæʔ˦	kaʔ˦ / kʌʔ˦	kɒʔ˦	koʔ˦	kʰœʔ˥ / kʰəʔ˥	kʰəʔ˦	kʰʌʔ˦
Songjiang	Sijing	松江泗涇	松江泗泾	le2	lɛ2		kæʔ7	kɑʔ7	kɔʔ7	koʔ7	kʰəʔ7		
Songjiang	Fengxian	奉賢縣城	奉贤县城	le˧˩	lɛ˧˩ / le˧˩	lɛ˧˩	kæʔ˥	kʌʔ˥	kɔʔ˥	koʔ˥	kʰœʔ˥	kʰeʔ˥	kʰʌʔ˥
Songjiang	Fengcheng	奉賢奉城	奉贤奉城	le2		lɛ2	kæʔ7	kɑʔ7	kɔʔ7	koʔ7	kʰœʔ7	kʰəʔ7	kʰʌʔ7
Songjiang	Jinshan	金山縣城	金山县城	le˧˩	lɛ˧˩		kæʔ˥	kɑʔ˥	kɔʔ˥		kʰəʔ˥		
Songjiang	Fengjing	金山楓涇	金山枫泾	le2	lɛ2		kaʔ7	kɑʔ7	kɔʔ7		kʰøʔ7	kʰəʔ7	
Songjiang	Qingpu	青浦縣城	青浦县城	lɪ˧˩	le˧˩		kæ˥	kɑʔ˥	kɔʔ˥	koʔ˥	kʰœʔ˥	kʰəʔ˥	kʰʌʔ˥

== Phonology ==
Following conventions of Chinese syllable structure, Shanghainese syllables can be divided into initials and finals. The initial occupies the first part of the syllable. The final occupies the second part of the syllable and can be divided further into an optional medial and an obligatory rime (sometimes spelled rhyme). Tone is also a feature of the syllable in Shanghainese. Syllabic tone, which is typical to the other Sinitic languages, has largely become verbal tone in Shanghainese.

=== Initials ===
The following is a list of all initials in Middle Period Shanghainese, as well as the Wugniu romanisation and example characters.

Initial Consonants
		Labial	Dental/ Alveolar	Palatal	Velar	Glottal
Nasal		m ⟨m⟩ 美悶梅門	n ⟨n⟩ 拿囡內男	ɲ ⟨gn⟩ 粘扭泥牛	ŋ ⟨ng⟩ 砑我外鵝	
Plosive	plain	p ⟨p⟩ 布幫北	t ⟨t⟩ 膽懂德		k ⟨k⟩ 干公夾	(ʔ) 鴨衣烏
Plosive	aspirated	pʰ ⟨ph⟩ 怕胖劈	tʰ ⟨th⟩ 透聽鐵		kʰ ⟨kh⟩ 開擴康	
Plosive	voiced	b ⟨b⟩ 步盆拔	d ⟨d⟩ 地動奪		ɡ ⟨g⟩ 葵共軋	
Affricate	plain		ts ⟨ts⟩ 煮增質	tɕ ⟨c⟩ 舉精腳		
Affricate	aspirated		tsʰ ⟨tsh⟩ 處倉出	tɕʰ ⟨ch⟩ 丘輕切		
Affricate	voiced			dʑ ⟨j⟩ 旗羣劇		
Fricative	voiceless	f ⟨f⟩ 飛粉福	s ⟨s⟩ 書松色	ɕ ⟨sh⟩ 修血曉		h ⟨h⟩ 花荒忽
Fricative	voiced	v ⟨v⟩ 扶服浮	z ⟨z⟩ 樹從石	ʑ ⟨zh⟩ 徐秦絕		ɦ ⟨gh⟩, ⟨y⟩, ⟨w⟩ 鞋移胡雨
Lateral			l ⟨l⟩ 拉賴領			

Shanghainese has a set of tenuis, lenis and fortis plosives and affricates, as well as a set of voiceless and voiced fricatives. Alveolo-palatal initials are also present in Shanghainese.

Voiced stops are phonetically voiceless with slack voice phonation in stressed, word initial position. This phonation (often referred to as murmur) also occurs in zero onset syllables, syllables beginning with fricatives, and syllables beginning with sonorants. These consonants are true voiced in intervocalic position. Sonorants are also suggested to be glottalised in dark tones (i.e. tones 1, 5, 7).

=== Finals ===
Being a Wu language, Shanghainese has a large array of vowel sounds. The following is a list of all possible finals in Middle Period Shanghainese, as well as the Wugniu romanisation and example characters.

Medial	Rime														
Medial	∅	a	ɔ	o	ɤ	e	ø	ã	ɑ̃	oŋ	ən	aʔ	oʔ	əʔ	liquid
∅	ɿ ⟨y⟩ 知次住	a ⟨a⟩ 太柴鞋	ɔ ⟨au⟩ 寶朝高	o ⟨o⟩ 花摸蛇	ɤ ⟨eu⟩ 斗丑狗	e ⟨e⟩ 雷來蘭	ø ⟨oe⟩ 干最亂	ã ⟨an⟩ 冷長硬	ɑ̃ ⟨aon⟩ 黨放忙	oŋ ⟨on⟩ 翁蟲風	ən ⟨en⟩ 奮登論	aʔ ⟨aq⟩ 辣麥客	oʔ ⟨oq⟩ 北郭目	əʔ ⟨eq⟩ 舌色割	əl ⟨er⟩ 而爾耳 (Note: 耳 only has this final in literary pronunciation.)
i	i ⟨i⟩ 基錢微	ia ⟨ia⟩ 野寫亞	iɔ ⟨iau⟩ 條蕉搖		iɤ ⟨ieu⟩ 流尤休	ie ⟨ie⟩ 廿械也 (Note: 也 only has this final in literary pronunciation.)		iã ⟨ian⟩ 良象陽	iɑ̃ ⟨iaon⟩ 旺 (Note: 旺 only has this final in colloquial pronunciation.)	ioŋ ⟨ion⟩ 窮榮濃	in ⟨in⟩ 緊靈人 (Note: 人 only has this final in colloquial pronunciation.)	iaʔ ⟨iaq⟩ 藥腳略	ioʔ ⟨ioq⟩ 肉浴玉	iɪʔ ⟨iq⟩ 筆亦吃	m ⟨m⟩ 呣畝嘸 (Note: 呣 and 畝 only have this final in colloquial pronunciation.)
u	u ⟨u⟩ 波歌做	ua ⟨ua⟩ 怪淮娃				ue ⟨ue⟩ 回慣彎	uø ⟨uoe⟩ 官歡緩	uã ⟨uan⟩ 橫光	uɑ̃ ⟨uaon⟩ 廣狂況		uən ⟨uen⟩ 困魂溫	uaʔ ⟨uaq⟩ 挖划刮		uəʔ ⟨ueq⟩ 活擴骨	
y	y ⟨iu⟩ 居女羽						yø ⟨ioe⟩ 園軟權				yn ⟨iun⟩ 均雲訓			yɪʔ ⟨iuq⟩ 血缺悅	ŋ ⟨ng⟩ 五魚午 (Note: 魚 and 午 only have this final in colloquial pronunciation.)

The transcriptions used above are broad and the following points are of note when pertaining to actual pronunciation:

- /n/ is enunciated with any part of the tongue, and is therefore in free variation as [n ~ ŋ].
- /ɑ̃/ is often rounded into [ɒ̃].
- The /ɔ/ in /ɔ/ and /iɔ/ are often lowered to [ɔ̞], whereas the /o/ in /oʔ/ and /ioʔ/ are often lowered to [o̞].
- /iɪʔ/ is pronounced as [ɪʔ] after labials and alveolars, whereas it is [iɪʔ] after glottal and alveolo-palatal initials.
- High vowels in front of /n/ can undergo breaking.
- /yɪʔ/ can be merged into /ioʔ/, resulting in one fewer rime.
- Rimes with final /ʔ/ are often simply realised with a shortened vowel nucleus when they are not utterance-final.
- Lips are not significantly rounded in rounded vowels, and not significantly unrounded in unrounded ones.
- /u, o/ are similar in pronunciation, differing slightly in lip rounding and height ([ɯ̽ᵝ, ʊ] respectively). /i, jɛ/ are also similar in pronunciation, differing slightly in vowel height ([i̞, i] respectively).
- Medial /i/ is pronounced [ɥ] before rounded vowels.

The Middle Chinese nasal rimes are all merged in Shanghainese. Middle Chinese /-p -t -k/ rimes have become glottal stops, /-ʔ/.

=== Tones ===
Shanghainese has five phonetically distinguishable tones for single syllables said in isolation. These tones are illustrated below in tone numbers. In terms of Middle Chinese tone designations, the dark tone category has three tones (dark rising and dark departing tones have merged into one tone), while the light category has two tones (the light level, rising and departing tones have merged into one tone).

Five Shanghainese Citation Tones with Middle Chinese Classifications
	Level (平)	Rising (上)	Departing (去)	Checked (入) (only with coda)
Dark (阴; 陰) voiceless initials only	53 (1) marked with acute	334 (5)		55ʔ (7)
Light (阳; 陽) voiced initials only	113 (6)			12ʔ (8)

Numbers in this table are those used by the Wugniu romanisation scheme.

The conditioning factors which led to the yin–yang (light-dark) split still exist in Shanghainese, as they do in most other Wu lects: light tones are only found with voiced initials, namely [b d ɡ z v dʑ ʑ m n ɲ ŋ l ɦ], while the dark tones are only found with voiceless initials.

The checked tones are shorter, and describe those rimes which end in a glottal stop /ʔ/. That is, both the yin–yang distinction and the checked tones are allophonic (dependent on syllabic structure). With this analysis, Shanghainese has only a two-way phonemic tone contrast, falling vs rising, and then only in open syllables with voiceless initials. Therefore, many romanisations of Shanghainese opt to only mark the dark level tone, usually with a diacritic such as an acute accent or grave accent.

==== Tone sandhi ====
Tone sandhi is a process whereby adjacent tones undergo dramatic alteration in connected speech. Similar to other Northern Wu dialects, Shanghainese is characterized by two forms of tone sandhi: a word tone sandhi and a phrasal tone sandhi.

Word tone sandhi in Shanghainese can be described as left-prominent and is characterized by a dominance of the first syllable over the contour of the entire tone domain. As a result, the underlying tones of syllables other than the leftmost syllable, have no effect on the tone contour of the domain. The pattern is generally described as tone spreading (1, 5, 6, 7) or tone shifting (8, except for 4-syllable compounds, which can undergo spreading or shifting). The table below illustrates possible tone combinations.

Left-Prominent Sandhi Tone Values
Tone	One syllable	Two syllables	Three syllables	Four syllables	Five syllables
1	53 (˥˧)	55 (˥˥) 21 (˨˩)	55 (˥˥) 33 (˧˧) 21 (˨˩)	55 (˥˥) 33 (˧˧) 33 (˧˧) 21 (˨˩)	55 (˥˥) 33 (˧˧) 33 (˧˧) 33 (˧˧) 21 (˨˩)
5	334 (˧˧˦)	33 (˧˧) 44 (˦˦)	33 (˧˧) 55 (˥˥) 21 (˨˩)	33 (˧˧) 55 (˥˥) 33 (˧˧) 21 (˨˩)	33 (˧˧) 55 (˥˥) 33 (˧˧) 33 (˧˧) 21 (˨˩)
6	113 (˩˩˧)	22 (˨˨) 44 (˦˦)	22 (˨˨) 55 (˥˥) 21 (˨˩)	22 (˨˨) 55 (˥˥) 33 (˧˧) 21 (˨˩)	22 (˨˨) 55 (˥˥) 33 (˧˧) 33 (˧˧) 21 (˨˩)
7	55 (˥˥)	33 (˧˧) 44 (˦˦)	33 (˧˧) 55 (˥˥) 21 (˨˩)	33 (˧˧) 55 (˥˥) 33 (˧˧) 21 (˨˩)	33 (˧˧) 55 (˥˥) 33 (˧˧) 33 (˧˧) 21 (˨˩)
8	12 (˩˨)	11 (˩˩) 23 (˨˧)	11 (˩˩) 22 (˨˨) 23 (˨˧)	11 (˩˩) 22 (˨˨) 22 (˨˨) 23 (˨˧); 22 (˨˨) 55 (˥˥) 33 (˧˧) 21 (˨˩)	22 (˨˨) 55 (˥˥) 33 (˧˧) 33 (˧˧) 21 (˨˩)

As an example, in isolation, the two syllables of the word 中國/中国 (China) are pronounced with a dark level tone (tsón) and dark checked tone (koq): /tsoŋ⁵³/ and /koʔ⁵⁵/. However, when pronounced in combination, the dark level tone of 中 (tsón) spreads over the compound resulting in the following pattern /tsoŋ⁵⁵ koʔ²¹/. Similarly, the syllables in the common expression 十三點/十三点 (zeq-sé-ti, "foolish") have the following underlying phonemic and tonal representations: /zəʔ¹²/ (zeq), /sɛ⁵³/ (sé), and /ti³³⁴/ (ti). However, the syllables in combination exhibit the light checked shifting pattern where the first syllable's toneme overrides that of the following syllables: /zəʔ¹¹ sɛ²² ti²³/.

Phrasal tone sandhi in Shanghainese can be described as right-prominent and is characterized by a right syllable retaining its underlying tone and a left syllable receiving a mid-level tone based on the underlying tone's register. The table below indicates possible left syllable tones in right-prominent compounds.

Possible Left Syllable Tone Values in Right-Prominent Sandhi
Tone	Underlying Tone	Neutralized Tone
1	53	44
5	334	44
6	113	33
7	55	44
8	12	22

For instance, when combined, 買/买 (ma, /ma¹¹³/, "to buy") and 酒 (cieu, /tɕiɤ³³⁴/, "wine") become /ma³³ tɕiɤ³³⁴/ ("to buy wine").

Sometimes meaning can change based on whether left-prominent or right-prominent sandhi is used. For example, 炒 (tshau, /tsʰɔ³³⁴/, "to fry") and 麪/面 (mi, /mi¹¹³/, "noodle") when pronounced /tsʰɔ³³ mi⁴⁴/ (i.e., with left-prominent sandhi) means "fried noodles". When pronounced /tsʰɔ⁴⁴ mi¹¹³/ (i.e., with right-prominent sandhi), it means "to fry noodles".

Nouns and adjectives attached to nouns tend to start left-prominent sandhi chains, whereas right-prominent chains are triggered by verbs and adverbs. Grammatical particles cannot start chains of their own, but instead can be realised as a null tone (轻声; 輕聲) or be part of another chain.

== Vocabulary ==
Note: Chinese characters for Shanghainese are not standardized and those chosen are those recommended in 上海话大词典. IPA transcription is for the Middle Period of modern Shanghainese (中派上海话; 中派上海話), pronunciation of those between 20 and 60 years old.

Due to the large number of migrants into Shanghai, its lexicon is less noticeably Wu, though it still retains many defining features. However, many of these now lost features can be found in lects spoken in suburban Shanghai.

Gloss	Common Wu term	Shanghainese term
place	場化; 场化	地方
rainbow	鱟; 鲎	彩虹
shy	坍銃; 坍铳	難為情; 难为情

Its basic negator is 勿 (veq), which according to some linguists, is sufficient ground to classify it as Wu.

Shanghainese also has a multitude of loan words from European languages, due to Shanghai's status as a major port in China. Most of these terms come from English, though there are some from other languages such as French. Some terms, such as 水门汀, have even entered mainstream and other Sinitic languages, such as Sichuanese.

Gloss	Shanghainese	Standard Mandarin	Origin
vaseline	凡士林		English
cement	水門汀; 水门汀	水泥	English
à la carte	阿拉加	西餐點菜; 西餐点菜	French
microphone	麥克風; 麦克风		English
butter	白脫; 白脱	黃油; 黄油	English

=== Common words and phrases ===
For more terms, see Shanghainese Swadesh list on Wiktionary.

English gloss	Simplified	Traditional	Romanisation (Note: Based on wugniu.com online lookup service. Dark level (阴平) tone marked with acute accent, with dashes showing left prominent sandhi.)
Shanghainese (language)	上海闲话	上海閒話	zaon-he ghe-gho
Shanghainese (people)	上海人		zaon-he-gnin
I	我		ngu
we or I	阿拉		aq-la, aq-laq
he/she	伊		yi
they	伊拉		yi-la, yi-laq
you (sing.)	侬	儂	non
you (plural)	㑚		na
hello	侬好	儂好	non hau
good-bye	再会	再會	tsé-we
thank you	谢谢	謝謝	zhia-ya, zhia-zhia
sorry	对勿起	對勿起	te-veq-chi
but, however	但是, 必过	但是, 必過	de-zy, piq-ku
please	请	請	chin
that	埃, 伊		é, í
this	搿		geq
there	埃垯, 伊垯	埃墶, 伊墶	é-taq, í-taq
here	搿垯	搿墶	geq-taq
to have	有		yeu
to be	是		zy
to be at	辣海		laq-he
now, current	现在, 乃	現在, 乃	yi-ze, ne
what time is it?	现在几点钟？	現在幾點鐘？	yi-ze ci-ti-tsón
where	何里垯, 啥地方	何裏墶, 啥地方	gha-li-taq, sa(-)di-faon
what	啥	啥	sa
who	啥人, 何里位		sa-gnin, gha-li-we
why	为啥	為啥	we-sa
when	啥辰光		sa-zen-kuáon
how	哪能		na-nen
how much?	几钿, 多少钞票	幾鈿, 多少鈔票	ci-di, tú-sau tsau-phiau
yes	哎		é
no	呒, 勿是, 呒没, 覅	嘸, 勿是, 嘸沒, 覅	m, veq-zy, m-meq, viau
telephone number	电话号头	電話號頭	di-gho(-)hau-deu
home	屋里	屋裏	oq-li
Come to our house and play.	到阿拉屋里向来白相！	到阿拉屋裏向來白相！	tau aq-la oq-li-shian le beq-shian
Where's the restroom?	汏手间辣辣何里垯？	汏手間辣辣何裏墶？	da-seu-ké laq-laq gha-li-taq
Have you eaten dinner?	夜饭吃过了𠲎？	夜飯喫過了𠲎？ (Note: Commonly substituted with 伐 due to computer support issues.)	ya-ve chiq-ku-leq-va
I don't know	我勿晓得。	我勿曉得。	ngu veq-shiáu-teq
Do you speak English?	侬英文讲得来𠲎？	儂英文講得來𠲎？	non ín-ven kaon-teq le va
I adore you	我爱慕侬！	我愛慕儂！	ngu é-mu non
I like you a lot	我老欢喜侬个！	我老歡喜儂個！	ngu lau huóe-shi non gheq
news	新闻	新聞	shín-ven
[one is] dead	死脱了	死脫了	shi-theq-leq
[one is] alive	活辣海		weq-laq-he
a lot	交关	交關	ciáu-kue
inside, within	里向	裏向	li-shian
outside	外头	外頭	nga-deu
How are you?	侬好𠲎？	儂好𠲎？	non hau va

=== Literary and vernacular pronunciations ===
Like other Sinitic languages, Shanghainese exhibits a difference between expected vernacular pronunciations, and literary pronunciations taken from the Mandarinic lingua franca of the time, be it Nanjingese, Hangzhounese, or Beijingese.

Traditional	Simplified	Literary	Vernacular	Gloss	Mandarin
家		ciá	ká	house	jiā
顏	颜	yi	nge	face	yán
櫻	樱	ín	án	cherry	yīng
孝		shiau	hau	filial piety	xiào
學	学	yaq	ghoq	learning	xué
物		veq	meq	thing	wù
網	网	waon	maon	web	wǎng
鳳	凤	von	bon	male phoenix	fèng
肥		vi	bi	fat	féi
日		zeq	gniq	sun	rì
人		zen	gnin	person	rén
鳥	鸟	gniau	tiau	bird	niǎo

These readings must be distinguished in vocabulary. Take for instance the following.

Sinograph	Literary	Colloquial
生	生物 sén-veq	生菜 sán-tshe
人	人民 zen-min	人來瘋/人来疯 gnin-le-fon
家	家庭 ciá-din	家主 ká-tsy

Some terms mix the two pronunciation types, such as 大學/大学 ("university"), where 大 is literary (da) and 學/学 is colloquial (ghoq).

== Grammar ==
Like other Sinitic languages, Shanghainese is an isolating language that lacks marking for tense, person, case, number or gender. Similarly, there is no distinction for tense or person in verbs, with word order and particles generally expressing these grammatical characteristics. There are, however, three important derivational processes in Shanghainese. However, some analyses do suggest that one can analyse Shanghainese to have tenses.

Although formal inflection is very rare in all varieties of Chinese, there does exist in Shanghainese a morpho-phonological tone sandhi that Zhu (2006) identifies as a form of inflection since it forms new words out of pre-existing phrases. This type of inflection is a distinguishing characteristic of all Northern Wu dialects.

Affixation, generally (but not always) taking the form of suffixes, occurs rather frequently in Shanghainese, enough so that this feature contrasts even with other Wu varieties, although the line between suffix and particle is somewhat nebulous. Most affixation applies to adjectives. In the example below, the term 頭勢/头势 (deu-sy) can be used to change an adjective to a noun.

搿 種 骯三 頭勢 勿 談 了！
搿 种 肮三 头势 勿 谈 了！
geq -tson áon-sé deu-sy veq- de leq
this CL disgusting deu-sy NEG mention P
Forget that disgusting thing!

Words can be reduplicated to express various differences in meaning. Nouns, for example, can be reduplicated to express collective or diminutive forms; adjectives so as to intensify or emphasize the associated description; and verbs to soften the degree of action. Below is an example of noun reduplication resulting in semantic alteration.

走 走
tseu tseu
walk walk
take a walk

Word compounding is also very common in Shanghainese, a fact observed as far back as Edkins (1868), and is the most productive method of creating new words. Many recent borrowings in Shanghainese originating from European languages are di- or polysyllabic.

=== Word order ===
Shanghainese adheres generally to SVO word order. The placement of objects in Wu dialects is somewhat variable, with Southern Wu varieties positioning the direct object before the indirect object, and Northern varieties (especially in the speech of younger people) favoring the indirect object before the direct object. Owing to Mandarin influence, Shanghainese usually follows the latter model.

Older speakers of Shanghainese tend to place adverbs after the verb, but younger people, again under heavy influence from Mandarin, favor pre-verbal placement of adverbs.

The third person singular pronoun 伊 (yi) (he/she/it) or the derived phrase 伊講/伊讲 (yi kaon) ("he says") can appear at the end of a sentence. This construction, which appears to be unique to Shanghainese, is commonly employed to project the speaker's differing expectation relative to the content of the phrase.

伊 伊講， 講 勿好。
伊 伊讲， 讲 勿好。
yi {yi kaon} kaon veq-hau
3S {he says} say NEG-good
Unexpectedly, he says no.

=== Nouns ===
Except for the limited derivational processes described above, Shanghainese nouns are isolating. There is no inflection for case or number, nor is there any overt gender marking. Although Shanghainese does lack overt grammatical number, the plural marker 拉 (la), when suffixed to a human denoting noun, can indicate a collective meaning.

學生 拉 個 書
学生 拉 个 书
ghoq-sán -la gheq sý
student PL POSS book
students' books

There are no articles in Shanghainese, and thus, no marking for definiteness or indefiniteness of nouns. Certain determiners (a demonstrative pronoun or numeral classifier, for instance) can imply definite or indefinite qualities, as can word order. A noun absent any sort of determiner in the subject position is definite, whereas it is indefinite in the object position.

老太婆 出來 了。
老太婆 出来 了。
lau-tha-bu tseq-le leq
{old lady} come.out P
The old lady is coming out.

來 朋友 了。
来 朋友 了。
le ban-yieu leq
come friend P
Here comes a friend.

==== Classifiers ====
Shanghainese boasts numerous classifiers (also sometimes known as "counters" or "measure words"). Most classifiers in Shanghainese are used with nouns, although a small number are used with verbs. Some classifiers are based on standard measurements or containers. Classifiers can be paired with a preceding determiner (often a numeral) to form a compound that further specifies the meaning of the noun it modifies.

搿 隻 皮球
搿 只 皮球
geq -tsaq bi-jieu
this CL ball
this ball

Classifiers can be reduplicated to mean "all" or "every", as in:

本		本
pen	-	pen
(classifier for books)
every [book]

=== Verbs ===
Shanghainese verbs are analytic and as such do not undergo any sort of conjugation to express tense or person. However, the language does have a richly developed aspect system, expressed using various particles. This system has been argued to be a tense system.

==== Aspect ====
Some disagreement exists as to how many formal aspect categories exist in Shanghainese, and a variety of different particles can express the same aspect, with individual usage often reflecting generational divisions. Some linguists identify as few as four or six, and others up to twelve specific aspects. Zhu (2006) identifies six relatively uncontroversial aspects in Shanghainese.

Progressive aspect expresses a continuous action. It is indicated by the particles 辣 (laq), 辣辣 (laq-laq) or 辣海 (laq-he), which occur pre-verbally.

伊 辣 做 功課 𠲎？
伊 辣 做 功课 𠲎？
yi laq tsu kón-khu vaq
3S PROG do homework Q
Is he doing his homework?

The resultative aspect expresses the result of an action which was begun before a specifically referenced timeframe, and is also indicated by 辣 (laq), 辣辣 (laq-laq) or 辣海 (laq-he), except that these occur post-verbally.

本事 學 辣海 將來 派用場
本事 学 辣海 将来 派用场。
pen-sy ghoq laq-he cián-le {pha yon-zan}
skill learn RES future {take advantage}
Acquire the skill and take advantage of it later.

Perfective aspect can be marked by 了 (leq), 仔 (tsy), 好 (hau) or 唻 (le). 仔 is seen as dated and younger speakers often use 了, likely through lenition and Mandarin influence.

衣裳	買	來	了。
衣裳	买	来	了。
í-zaon	ma	le	leq
clothes	buy	PFV	PF
The clothes have been bought.

Zhu (2006) identifies a future aspect, indicated by the particle 要 (iau).

明朝	要	落雨	個。
明朝	要	落雨	个。
min-tsau	iau	loq yu	gheq
tomorrow	FUT	rain	P
It's going to rain tomorrow.

Qian (1997) identifies a separate immediate future aspect, marked post-verbally by 快 (khua).

電影	散場	快了。
电影	散场	快了。
di-in	se-zaon	khua-leq
movie	finish	IMM.FUT P
The movie is soon to finish

Experiential aspect expresses the completion of an action before a specifically referenced timeframe, marked post-verbally by the particle 過/过 (ku).

我	到	海裡	去	游泳	游過	五趟。
我	到	海里	去	游泳	游过	五趟。
ngu	tau	he-li	chi	yeu-yon	yeu-ku	ng-thaon
1S	to	sea-in	go	swim	swim-EXP	five-times
I have swum the sea five times (so far).

The durative aspect is marked post-verbally by 下去 (gho-chi), and expresses a continuous action.

儂	就	讓	伊	做	下去	好了。
侬	就	让	伊	做	下去	好了。
non	zhieu	gnian	yi	tsu	gho-chi	hau-leq
2S	even	let	3S	do	DUR	good-PF
Please let him continue to do it.

In some cases, it is possible to combine two aspect markers into a larger verb phrase.

功課	做	好	快了。
功课	做	好	快了。
kón-khu	tsu	hau	khua-leq
homework	do	PFV	IMM.FUT PF
The homework will have been completed before long.

==== Mood and voice ====
There is no overt marking for mood in Shanghainese, and Zhu (2006) goes so far as to suggest that the concept of grammatical mood does not exist in the language. There are, however, several modal auxiliaries (many of which have multiple variants) that collectively express concepts of desire, conditionality, potentiality and ability.

"can"	能 (nen); 能夠 (nen-keu); 好 (hau)
"be able"	會/会 (ue); 會得/会得 (ue-teq)
"may"	可以 (khu-i)
"would like"	要 (iau)
"should"	應該/应该 (ín-ké)
"willing to"	情願/情愿 (zhin-gnioe); 願意/愿意 (gnioe-i)
"happy to"	高興/高兴 (káu-shin)
"want to"	想 (shian); 好 (hau)

Shen (2016) argues for the existence of a type of passive voice in Shanghainese, governed by the particle 撥/拨 (peq). This construction is superficially similar to by-phrases in English, and only transitive verbs can occur in this form of passive.

餅乾	撥	人家	吃脫了。
饼干	拨	人家	吃脱了。
pin-kóe	peq	gnin-ká	chiq-theq-leq
biscuit	by	someone	eat-PF
The biscuits were eaten by someone.

=== Pronouns ===
Personal pronouns in Shanghainese do not distinguish gender or case. Owing to its isolating grammatical structure, Shanghainese is not a pro-drop language.

	Singular		Plural
1st person	我 (Note: Younger speakers tend to pronounce this as wu.)		阿拉
1st person	ngu		aq-la aq-laq
2nd person	儂	侬	㑚
2nd person	non		na
3rd person	伊		伊拉
3rd person	yi		yi-la yi-laq

There is some degree of flexibility concerning pronoun usage in Shanghainese. Older varieties of Shanghainese featured a different 1st person plural 我伲 (ngu-gni), whereas younger speakers tend to use 阿拉 (aq-laq), which originates from Ningbonese. While Zhu (2006) asserts that there is no inclusive 1st person plural pronoun, Hashimoto (1971) disagrees, identifying 阿拉 as being inclusive. There are generational and geographical distinctions in the usage of plural pronoun forms, as well as differences of pronunciation in the 1st person singular.

Reflexive pronouns are formed by the addition of the particle 自家 (zy-ka), as in:

伊 只好 怪 自家。
yi tseq-hau kua zy-ka
he {can only} blame self
He can only blame himself.

Possessive pronouns are formed via the pronominal suffix 個/个 (gheq), for instance, 我個/我个 (ngu gheq). This pronunciation is a glottalised lenition of the expected pronunciation, ku.

=== Adjectives ===
Most basic Shanghainese adjectives are monosyllabic. Like other parts of speech, adjectives do not change to indicate number, gender or case. Adjectives can take semantic prefixes, which themselves can be reduplicated or repositioned as suffixes according to a complex system of derivation, to express degree of comparison or other changes in meaning. Thus:

冷 lan ("cold")
冰冷 pín-lan ("ice-cold"), where 冰 means ice
冰冰冷 pín-pín-lan ("cold as ice")

=== Interrogatives ===
The particle 𠲎 (va) is used to transform ordinary declarative statements into yes/no questions. This is the most common way of forming questions in Shanghainese.

儂	好	𠲎？
侬	好	𠲎？
non	hau	va
2S	good	Q
How are you? (lit. "Are you good?")

=== Negation ===
Nouns and verbs can be negated by the verb 嘸沒/呒没 (m-meq), "to not have", whereas 勿 veq is the basic negator.

搿 勿是 枱子。
geq veq-zy de-tsy
this {NEG be} table
This is not a table.

== Writing ==
Chinese characters are often used to write Shanghainese. Though there is no formal standardisations, there are characters recommended for use, mostly based on dictionaries. However, Shanghainese is often informally written using Shanghainese or even Standard Mandarin near-homophones. For instance "lemon" (níngméng), written 檸檬/柠檬 in Standard Chinese, may be written 人門/人门 (person-door; Pinyin: rénmén, Wugniu: gnin-men) in Shanghainese; and "yellow" (黄; 黃; huáng, Wugniu: waon) may be written 王 (meaning king; Pinyin: wáng, Wugniu: waon) rather than the standard character 黃/黄 for yellow.

Some of the time, nonstandard characters are used even when trying to use etymologically correct characters, due to compatibility (such as 伐) or pronunciation shift (such as 辣海).

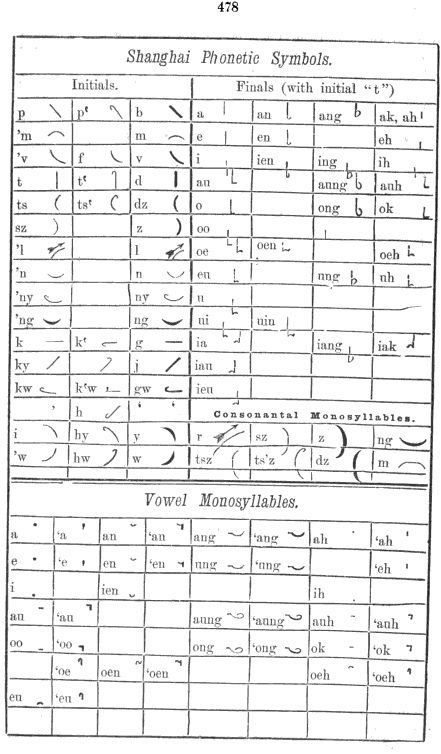
Rev. Silsby's symbols

Romanization of Shanghainese was first developed by Protestant English and American Christian missionaries in the 19th century, including Joseph Edkins. Usage of this romanization system was mainly confined to translated Bibles for use by native Shanghainese, or English–Shanghainese dictionaries, some of which also contained characters, for foreign missionaries to learn Shanghainese. A system of phonetic symbols similar to Chinese characters called "New Phonetic Character" were also developed by in the 19th century by American missionary Tarleton Perry Crawford. Since the 21st century, online dictionaries such as the Wu MiniDict and Wugniu have introduced their own Romanization schemes. Nowadays, the MiniDict and Wugniu Romanizations are the most commonly used standardized ones.

Protestant missionaries in the 1800s created the Shanghainese Phonetic Symbols to write Shanghainese phonetically. The symbols are a syllabary similar to the Japanese kana system. The system has not been used and is only seen in a few historical books.

== Media ==
Over the last decade, Shanghainese has become more prominent in Chinese television. Shows have increasingly included Shanghainese dialogue and/or been offered entirely in Shanghainese. However, the number of Shanghainese/Shanghai-based TV shows is still comparatively low.

Name	Release year
繁花 (Blossoms Shanghai)	2023
Nothing But Thirty	2020
All Out of Love	2018
Women in Shanghai	2018
If You Are the One	2010
Shanghai Bund	2007
Home with Kids	2005
Once Upon a Time in Shanghai	1996
Sinful Debt	1995

== See also ==
- Shanghainese people
- Haipai
- Wu Chinese
  - Suzhounese
  - Hangzhounese
  - Ningbonese
- List of varieties of Chinese
- Chinatown, Flushing
