= Puett =

Puett is a surname. Notable people with the surname include:

- Clay Puett (1899–1998), American inventor
- Devyn Puett (born 1977), American actress, singer, and dancer
- Tommy Puett (born 1971), American actor, singer, dancer, and businessman

== See also ==
- Pruett, another surname
