= Daughter of Han: The Autobiography of a Chinese Working Woman =

1945 book by Ida Pruitt

Cover of the Book Daughter of Han: The Autobiography of a Chinese Working Woman by Ida Pruitt

Daughter of Han: The Autobiography of a Chinese Working Woman, a 1945 book by Ida Pruitt, is an autobiography in the form of rewritten interviews with Ning Lao T'ai-t'ai (Old Mrs. Ning; 1867 – after 1938, an illiterate Chinese village woman.

Her family name is "Ning"; "Lao," "old," or "venerable," is a term of respect; and "t'ai t'ai" (pinyin tai-tai) is the title of a married woman. "Ning Lao T'ai-t'ai" is best translated as "Old Mrs. Ning."

== About the Author ==
Ida Pruitt was an American educator and social worker born to American missionaries in the Shandong Province of China. Her childhood was spent in China, and after finishing college at Columbia University's Teaching College in 1910, she returned to China to teach at a school for girls in Chefoo. In 1921 she was hired by the Rockefeller foundation to run the Department of Social Work at Peking Union Medical College. She remained there until 1938. It was during this time that she met with Ning.

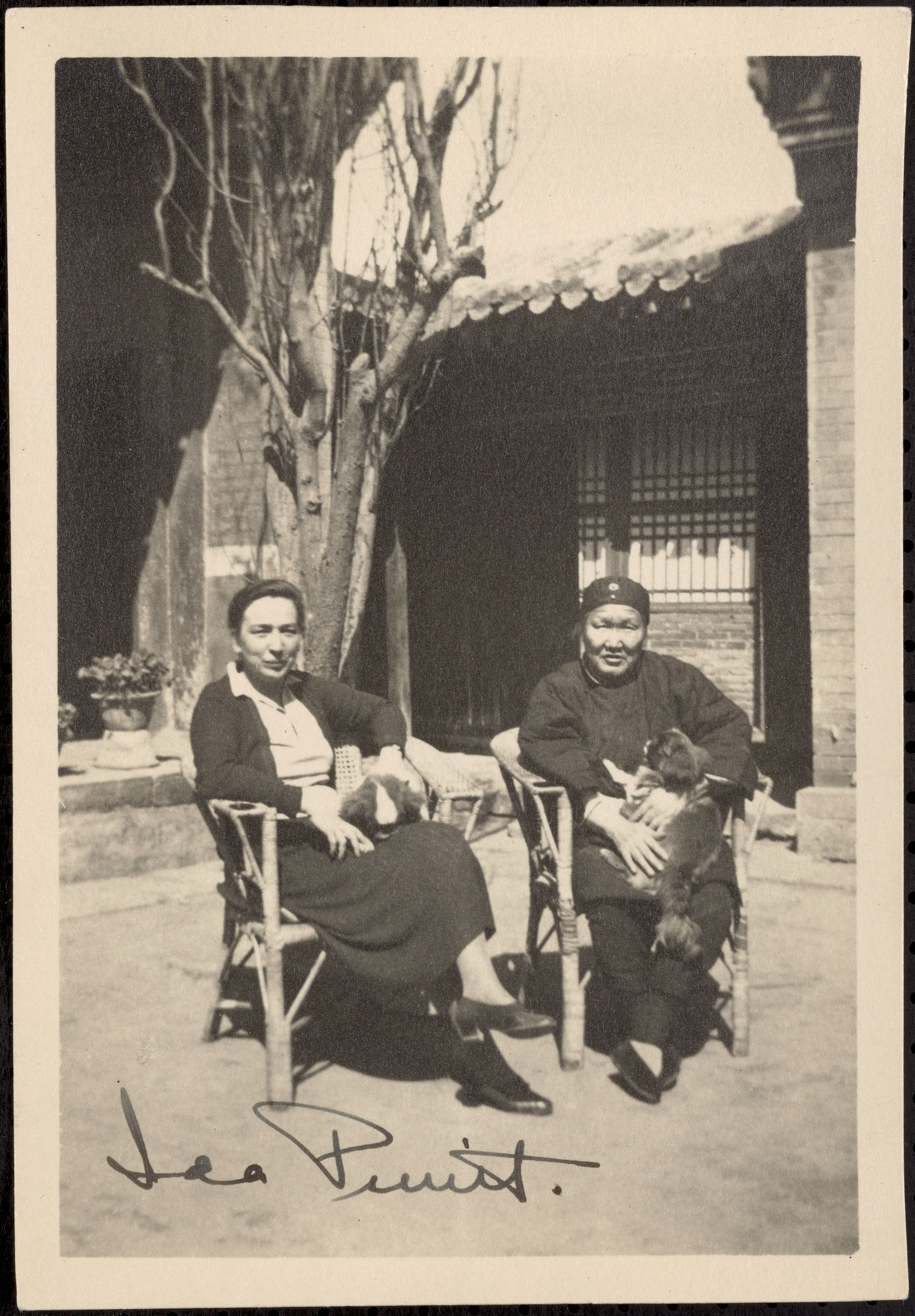
Ida Pruitt Sitting with Ning Lao T'ai-T'ai

Pruitt met Ning through Ning's son. She initially wanted to interview Ning on old family customs and folk tales, especially concerning childbirth, marriage and death. However, both women bonded over being from Shandong province and became close friends. They met over breakfast three days a week for two years, until 1938 when they parted ways, Pruitt returning to America and Ning to remain in Shandong.

== Content of the Book ==
=== Phase 1: Childhood to Marriage ===
Ning Lao T'ai - T'ai was the youngest child of three, with one older sister and one older brother. Her family lived in Penglai, in the Shandong province of China. She was born into poverty: her father wasted the money he inherited, and her mother didn't know how to ration food for her family. Her father sold cakes and bread, eventually getting a job in a general store. Despite living in poverty, her parents were good to her, and taught her how to behave properly as a growing young woman in rural China. Her mother taught her how to cook and sew, skills deemed essential for a wife. Ning's feet were first bound at age 7, a typical age for girls to have their feet bound. At age 13 she was considered a woman, and was married to a man who was 29.

=== Phase 2: Marriage ===
Ida Pruitt Sitting with Ning in Pruitt's Courtyard

When Ning first arrived at her husband's home, she struggled to adjust. She spent half of every month living with her mother, her father being away for work. Her husband was an opium user, leading Ning to hide money and belongings so he wouldn't exchange it for opium. Her husband's opium usage caused many rifts between the couple. During this time Ning had two daughters with her husband, Mantze and Chinya. Shortly after Chinya's birth, Ning's father died on a work trip due to infection in his intestines.

Ning's mother died at age 53. Ning was 21. Ning and her siblings cared for their mother until she died, and though they wanted to give her a proper burial rite, because of their poverty they weren't able to acquire the needed clothes for her to wear as she entered the afterlife. With her parents dead and her siblings gone, Ning was left with just her husband, who would leave for days at a time to find opium. Women were expected to remain in the house, so Ning was forced to scramble to find food for her and her children.

in 1889 Ning's husband sold their youngest daughter Chinya to a brothel for opium. Ning searched for her daughter, and demanded that the brothel owners return Chinya to her. She was able to retrieve her daughter, claiming that a child could not be sold without a mother's consent. A year later her husband took Chinya and sold her again, to an official's second wife who didn't have any children. When Ning went to get her daughter back, the wife claimed that she would raise Chinya not as a servant, but as her own daughter, and as the daughter of an official she would have a better life than she would with Ning. Ning left Chinya with the official family, but decided it was better to be a beggar than remain with the man who sold her daughter for opium. She took her eldest daughter Mantze and left, saying that being a beggar would have more freedom for her.

=== Phase 3: Working ===
Ning took her daughter Mantze and left her husband in 1889. From there she worked for a multitude of different families. Over the years she worked for a military official's family, a Muslim family, civil officials, missionaries, Russians, and then as a peddler selling common household wares. In these families, her roles included sewing, cooking, and caring for the children in the household. The chapters detailing her work in these various households portray the different customs that different cultures brought to China, and how those customs interacted with China's standards.

Ning credits the reasoning of moving between families to her temper:

"Always it is my temper that has lost jobs for me. It has always been because of my temper that I did not stay long in one position. Always they would say that they liked me but that my mouth was not governed." (p. 214)

=== Phase 4: Old Life and Family ===
When Ning's daughter Mantze turned 15 in 1889, Ning decided to have Mantze learn how to cook and sew so she could be married off. During this time, Ning also reunited with her husband, who had become "more dependable in his later years" (p. 142). Her husband still smoked opium, but he no longer sold everything in the house, and would sell food to pay for his clothes.

Mantze was married at 17 in 1901 while Ning was working for the missionaries. Mantze was married to a man who was a shoe cobbler, but found that he acted similarly to Ning's husband, constantly stealing for his own benefit. Mantze's husband eventually left for Manchuria, leaving Mantze with two daughters, one who died and other - Su Teh - who lived.

The time that Mantze had Su Teh, Ning had a son Suochutze with her husband. Her husband died a year later at the age of 55. Ning reported that she did not miss him, and was glad that he was gone.

With her husband gone, Ning continued to work, providing for herself, Mantze and Suochutze. She married her son off, who started his own family in Beiping (now Beijing) that Ning lived with in her later years. Her granddaughter Su Teh became a college professor, and in 1938 when the Second Sino Japanese War began, Su Teh left to support the war effort against Ning's wishes. Ning remained with her son Suochutze's family in Beiping.

== Critical reactions and analysis ==
Daughter of Han has received many acknowledgments for its work and contents throughout the years. It discusses common mentalities during the Qing dynasty regarding destiny and fate, and connections to religions such as Confucianism and Buddhism. Below includes different reviews thoughts on Daughter of Han.

Lewis Hodous wrote that although the story follows one woman, "the events of her life reach out into the experiences of many other people" (p. 343). He congratulates Pruitt and Ning's ability to encapture the "experiences, hopes and fears of China" (p. 343) by discussing common beliefs of destiny and fate of women in northern China.

The anthropologist Francis L. K. Hsu welcomed the book in 1946, claiming that it contains a "store of intimate knowledge on life on China" (p. 644) and includes thorough descriptions of traditional Chinese culture that is difficult to find in other literature. He emphasizes that Mrs. Ning was steeped in traditional Chinese culture, which emphasizes fate and fatalism, even though her actual behavior is active and not passive or resigned. Her attitude was "no different from that of the forefathers of present day Americans who prayed to God but kept their powder dry" (p. 645).

Maxwell S Stewart congratulates Ning's ability to provide context clues and details to paint a vivid story. He writes that "The net result is a picture of traditional Chinese life that is more penetrating than could possibly be obtained from sociological study and far better balanced than can be found in any fictional treatment" (p. 96).
