= Pruett =

Pruett is most commonly a surname in American vernacular. Notable people with the surname include:

- Allan K. Pruett (1948–2008), American basketball player
- Robert Lewis "Bob" Pruett (born 1943), American football coach
- Hubert Shelby "Hub" "Shucks" Pruett (1900–1982), American baseball player
- Norma Jean "Jeanne" Bowman, Mrs. Jack Pruett (born 1937), American country music singer
- Kyle D. Pruett (contemporary), American child psychiatrist, author, and television host
- Marion Albert Pruett (1950–1999), American serial killer
- Millus and Myles Pruett (or Pruitt), American blues musicians in the 1920s
- R. C. Pruett (born 1944), American politician from Oklahoma
- Scott Donald Pruett (born 1960), American race car driver

== See also ==
- Pruitt, another surname
- Puett, another surname
