= Mary Pruitt =

American politician (1934–2020)

Member of the Tennessee House of Representatives from the 58th district
- In office 1985–2013
- Preceded by: Charles J. Walker
- Succeeded by: Harold M. Love Jr.

Personal details
- Born: Mary Johnson; February 3, 1934 Brentwood, Tennessee, US
- Died: September 19, 2020 (aged 86) Nashville, Tennessee, US
- Party: Democratic
- Spouse: Charles Pruitt (m. 1960; died 1985)
- Children: 3
- Education: Tennessee State University

Mary Pruitt (February 3, 1934 – September 19, 2020) was an American politician and Tennessee State Representative from Nashville, representing the 58th district from 1985 to 2013.

== Biography ==
Pruitt was born in Brentwood, Tennessee in 1934. A member of the Tennessee House of Representatives since 1985, Pruitt was originally elected in a special election upon the death of her husband, Charles Pruitt, who had previously held the position.

Pruitt is a National Honorary member of Sigma Gamma Rho, member of the Order of Eastern Star, 100 Black Women of Middle TN, a State Fair Board Commissioner, and a member of the Meharry Medical College Board of Trustees. She has a B.S. and M.ED. from Tennessee State University and matriculated, but did not graduate from, the University of Northern Colorado.

"She really was an advocate for education," U.S. representative for Nashville Harold Love Jr. said of Pruitt. Pruitt, a retired teacher with both an undergraduate and graduate degree from Tennessee State University, "realized the importance of that [education]." "She knew that if kids were given the opportunity to have a good learning environment, then of course the world was theirs."

She died after a fall on September 19, 2020, at the age of 86.

== Investigations ==
Pruitt was the subject of several investigations focusing on inappropriate or illegal use of funds. In 2006, it was discovered that she was renting a campaign office from herself, but the building was not used, and for some time, did not have utilities. Rep. Pruitt denied the charges, charging entrapment, but was fined $10,000 for failing to appear before the Registry of Election Finance (later reversed). Pruitt's attorney argued that utilities were routinely disconnected to discourage vandalism.

Investigations of public records also found several potential conflicts of interest. A scholarship fund which Pruitt directed awarded a scholarship to her relative. A legislative earmark Pruitt requested awarded $55,000 to a corporation she founded. Pruitt requested and received a per diem allowance for travel and lodging, despite living two miles from her office.
