= Barrettsville, Georgia =

Barrettsville
- Unincorporated community
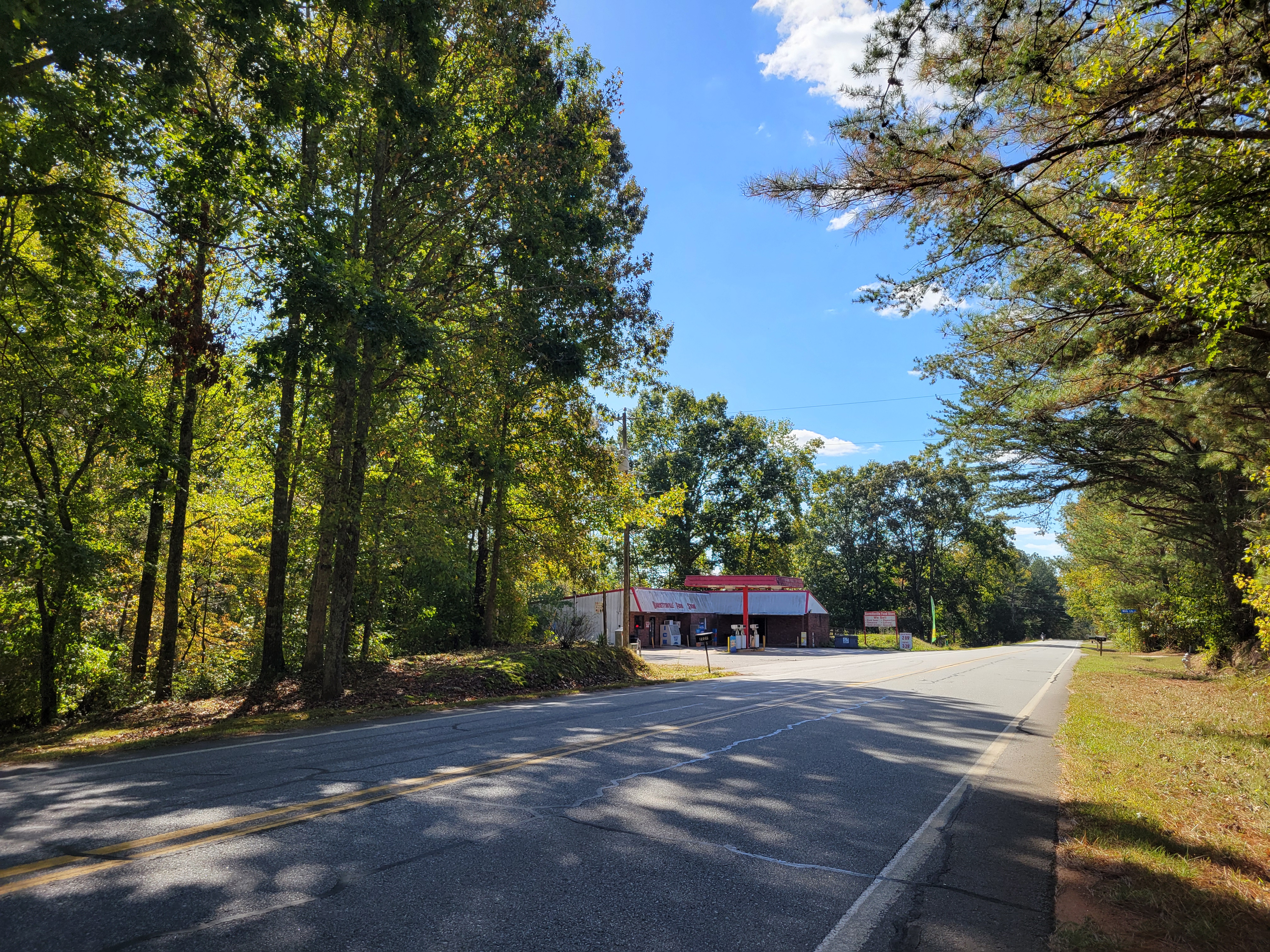
- Barrettsville Food Store

- Location within the state of Georgia
- Coordinates: 34°20′23″N 84°9′25″W
- Country: United States
- State: Georgia
- County: Dawson
- Elevation: 1,247 ft (380 m)
- Time zone: UTC-5 (Eastern (EST))
  - Summer (DST): UTC-4 (EDT)
- GNIS feature ID: 331097

Barrettsville is an unincorporated community located in Dawson County, Georgia, United States.

== History ==
James Tarrance Barrett, second son of John and Milly Rebecca Chastain Barrett, was born in South Carolina in 1803. He Died January 19, 1867, at Barrettsville, Dawson County, Georgia. He was Buried at Concord Baptist Church, near Barrettsville.

During James's life he bought a trading post from Indians in Dawson County. As it became, and later bought a tract of land which was deeded to him by the state of Georgia. Later he was joined by his oldest brother Ruben N. Barrett, and his half brother John R. Barrett (Jack). Thus the center became known as Barrettsville.
