= John Albert Broadus =

American pastor and theologian

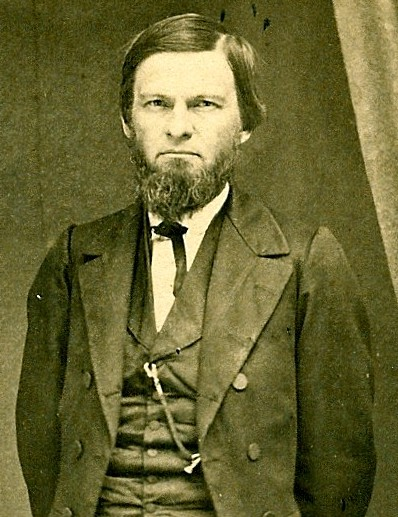
- Born: January 24, 1827; Culpeper County, Virginia, U.S.
- Died: March 16, 1895 (aged 68); Louisville, Kentucky, U.S.
- Resting place: Cave Hill Cemetery
- Education: University of Virginia
- Occupations: Preacher, seminary president and professor

John Albert Broadus (January 24, 1827 – March 16, 1895) was an American Baptist pastor and President of the Southern Baptist Theological Seminary.

== Early life ==
Born in 1827 in Culpeper County, Virginia, Broadus was educated at home and at a private school. He taught in a small school before completing his undergraduate studies at the University of Virginia in Charlottesville, Virginia.

== Career ==
Broadus was ordained in 1850 and became pastor of the Baptist church in Charlottesville.

In 1859, Broadus along with James P. Boyce, Basil Manly Jr., and William Williams, founded the Southern Baptist Theological Seminary in Greenville, South Carolina. Broadus became professor of New Testament interpretation and homiletics at the Southern Baptist Theological Seminary. With Manley, Broadus was also one of the first leaders of the Sunday School Board publishing operations.

During the American Civil War, he served as a Confederate chaplain to Robert E. Lee's army in Northern Virginia.

He delivered a lecture at the University of Virginia in memorial to Professor Gessner Harrison in 1873.

In 2018 the President of the Seminary commissioned a "Report on slavery and racism within the history of the Southern Baptist Seminary" which found that Broadus and its principal founders combined owned 50 slaves, Broadus owning at least two slaves, and the faculty and trustees at the seminary defended the “righteousness of slavery” and supported the Confederacy's efforts to preserve slavery. After the war ended and public sentiment began to shift, Broadus 'repudiated' American slavery in 1882. In 1883, he delivered an address for the Confederate cause at Louisville's Cave Hill Cemetery arguing both sides had justifiable reasons for war.

In 1888, he became Southern Seminary's second president.

In 1889, Broadus delivered the Beecher Lectures at Yale Divinity School.

Broadus died on March 16, 1895, in Louisville. He was buried in Cave Hill Cemetery.

== Personal life ==
Broadus married Maria Carter Harrison on November 14, 1849. She died October 21, 1857. He remarried, to Charlotte Eleanor Sinclair (1836–1913) on January 4, 1859.

== Legacy ==
Charles Spurgeon called Broadus the "greatest of living preachers." Church historian Albert Henry Newman called Broadus "perhaps the greatest preacher the Baptists have produced."

The official gavel of the Southern Baptist Convention bears the name of Broadus and, in June, 2020, President J.D. Greear proposed the organization "retire the Broadus gavel" "amid nationwide protests around racial injustice that has led to the removal of Confederate statues and symbols."

The Southern Baptist Theological Seminary named Broadus chapel (modeled after the First Baptist Church in America, located in Providence, Rhode Island) in his honor.

Lottie Moon was converted at an evangelistic meeting led by Broadus in 1858. Broadus had founded the Albemarle Female Institute which Moon attended and from which she graduated.

== Selected works ==
- A Treatise on the Preparation and Delivery of Sermons (26 ed.). New York: A.C. Armstrong and Son. 1903 [1870].
- A Memorial of Gessner Harrison: M. D., Professor of Ancient Languages in the University of Virginia. Charlottesville: Chronicle. 1874.
- Lectures on the History of Preaching. New York: Sheldon & Co. 1876.
- Alvah Hovey, ed. (1886). Commentary on the Gospel of Matthew. Philadelphia: American Baptist Publication Society.
- Sermons and Addresses (7 ed.). New York: Hodder and Stoughton, Doran. 1886.
- Jesus of Nazareth: I. His Personal Character, II. His Ethical Teachings, III. His Supernatural Works (2 ed.). New York: A.C. Armstrong. 1890.
- Memoir of James Petigru Boyce. New York: A. C. Armstrong and Son. 1893. (see James Petigru Boyce)
- A Harmony of the Gospels in the Revised Version: With Some New Features (3 ed.). New York: A.C. Armstrong and Son. 1894.
- Commentary on the Gospel of Mark. Philadelphia: American Baptist Publication Society. 1905.
