= Oreana Peak =

Mountain in Nevada, United States

Coordinates: 38.8649102°N 119.4782204°W

Oreana Peak is a summit in the U.S. state of Nevada. The elevation is 9,245 feet (2,818 m).

Oreana Peak was named for its deposits of ore.
