= Anna Seward Pruitt =

Anna (Seward) Pruitt (1862–1948), was a Protestant Christian missionary in Northern China. She belonged to the so-called "missionary generation" of Americans born between the years 1860-1885.

She was born in Tallmadge, Ohio, on May 16, 1862, the daughter of John Woodhouse and Urania (Ashley) Seward. She traveled west in the early 1880s to teach school in Ojai, California; her letters about the trip were later published in the California Historical Quarterly (1937–1938).

== Early years and children ==
To honor the example of a beloved cousin who had died in mission work in China, Anna Seward decided to travel there as a Presbyterian missionary and settled in Huang Xian, Shandong province in North China, where she met Cicero Washington Pruitt. They married on February 16, 1888, and had five children: Ida (1888–1985), John (1890–1912), Ashley (1892–1898), Virginia (died in infancy, 1894), Robert (1897–1961), and Dudley McConnell "Mac" (1902–1967). The death of Ashley and Virginia inspired Southern Baptists to send money to start a hospital in Huang Xian.

The famous missionary Lottie Moon apparently babysat the children on some occasions. Ida Pruitt was one of the few Westerners that remained influential in Chinese aid and development throughout much of the century even after the communist take over. While stationed in Huangxian, the children attended school at the Chefoo School operated by the China Inland Mission. Anna Seward began a missionary school for boys, and by 1904 C.W. Pruitt had organized the Baptist Theological Seminary for Central China.

== Later years ==
After C.W. retired in 1936, they returned to the United States and settled in Atlanta where he became the dean of the Baptist Foreign Missions of North America. Anna spent the last years of her life traveling and lecturing on China and mission work. Anna Seward died on June 20, 1948.

== Writings ==
Anna wrote two books about missionary life in China:

- The Day of Small Things (Foreign Mission Board, Southern Baptist Convention, 1929)
- Up from Zero: In North China (Broadman Press, 1939)

She also wrote two children's books set in China:

- Whirligigs in China: Stories for Juniors (Broadman, 1948)
- The Chinese Boat Baby (Rice Press, 1938)

Most of this article is taken from the Radcliffe Finding Aid. See link below.

== See also ==
- Ida Pruitt
- C.W. Pruitt
- Lottie Moon
- Southern Baptists
- 19th-century Protestant missions in China
- List of Protestant missionaries in China
- Christianity in China
