= Oriana Cinema =

Former cinema in Fremantle, Western Australia

- Hoyts Fremantle
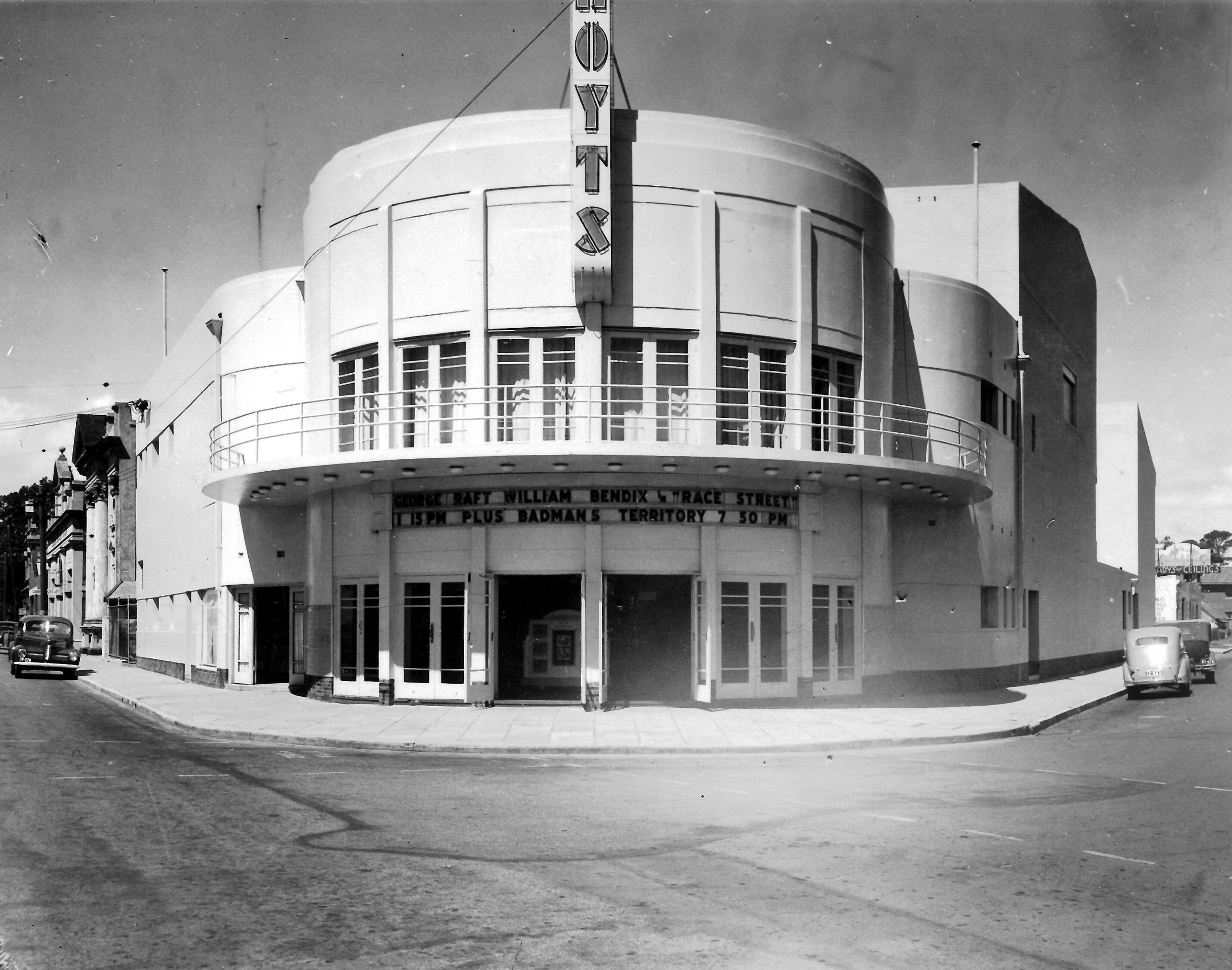
- Oriana Cinema in 1950
- Interactive map of Oriana Cinema
- Address: 177 High Street; Fremantle; Australia
- Coordinates: 32.053708°S 115.749512°E
- Owner: Hoyts (Fremantle) Pty Ltd
- Operator: Hoyts, City Theatres
- Capacity: 1,200

Construction
- Opened: 4 August 1938
- Closed: 1971
- Demolished: March 1972
- Architects: H. V. Taylor and Soilleux

The Oriana Cinema was an art deco cinema and theatre built in 1938 in Fremantle, Western Australia and demolished in the early 1970s.

== History ==
In 1937, a local company, Hoyts (Fremantle) Pty Ltd (formed by local businessmen and Hoyts Theatres Limited), proposed to construct a picture theatre at the corner of High Street and Queen Street, Fremantle. The cinema was estimated to cost £A 20,000, equivalent to A$2.02 million in 2022, and seat 1,300 persons. The site was previously occupied by the Rose and Crown Hotel which was built in 1830, although in the late 1870s it was used as a school, and a private dwelling and lodging rooms. The architects were H. Vivian Taylor and Soilleux of Melbourne, who designed the Windsor Theatre in Windsor, the Padua Theatre in Brunswick, and the Plaza Theatre in Perth. The cinema, Hoyts Fremantle, was officially opened by the acting Mayor of Fremantle, Cr Stevens on Thursday, 4 August, 1938. The first film shown at the cinema was Walt Disney Productions' Snow White and the Seven Dwarves and Love on a Budget, starring Shirley Temple.

The cinema, due to the acutely angled intersection on which the site was situated, created a visually striking design. The entrance foyer, lounge and stairways were unusual in their spherical design. The cinema featured a floating screen, a soundproof crying room to allow parents with crying babies to watch the movies, and a powder bar in the women's lounge. It was also unique in that it used ducted ventilation rather than air conditioning.

The cinema remained under the management of Hoyts (Fremantle) Pty Ltd until 1961 when it was bought by a consortium of stakeholders including Goldfields Pictures and City Theatres (owned by TVW). This was when it was given the name Oriana Cinema. In 1967 the cinema was renovated reducing the seating capacity to approximately 1,000 and in May 1968 a new 70 mm (2.8 in) screen was installed. The last screening at the cinema occurred on 4 December 1971.

The demolition was a speedy affair brought about by plans to widen High Street, and despite protest by community groups was effected within four weeks, in March 1972. The building built in its place is set back considerably from the road, with respect to its neighbour the Victoria Hall, as the road-widening plans never did come to fruition.

Following the demolition of the cinema, a series of menswear shops (1972: Walsh's Mens Wear; June 1979: Geoffrey Bruce Men's Clothier) filled the new building, which as of 2012 houses La Tropicana Café, Magpie Books, Raine and Horne Real Estate Agency, Potters House Christian Church, and ITP Tax Agents.
