= Harold M. Love Jr. =

American politician (born 1972)

Harold Love Jr.
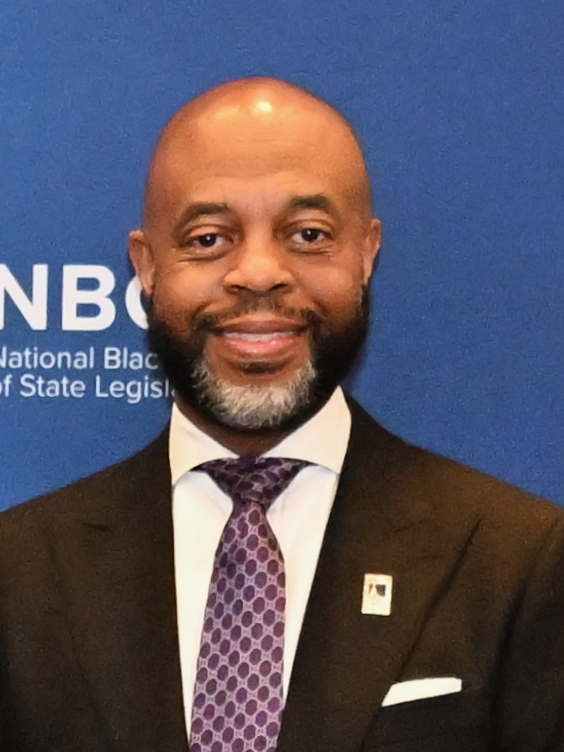
- Love in 2024

Assistant Minority Leader of the Tennessee House of Representatives
- Incumbent
- Assumed office September 16, 2019
- Preceded by: Rick Staples

Member of the Tennessee House of Representatives from the 58th district
- Incumbent
- Assumed office January 8, 2013
- Preceded by: Mary Pruitt

Personal details
- Born: Harold Moses Love Jr. December 14, 1972 (age 53) Nashville, Tennessee, U.S.
- Party: Democratic
- Spouse: Leah
- Education: Tennessee State University; Vanderbilt University
- Occupation: Pastor
- Website: haroldlovejr.com

Harold Moses Love Jr. (born December 14, 1972) is an American politician. A member of the Democratic Party, he represents the 58th district in the Tennessee House of Representatives. He is the House Democratic assistant leader and President of the National Black Caucus of State Legislators.

Love's father, Harold Moses Love Sr., was a Nashville city councilman from 1962 to 1970 and a member of the Tennessee House of Representatives for the 54th district from 1968 to 1994.

== Early life and education ==
Harold M. Love Jr. was born on December 14, 1972, in Nashville, Tennessee, to Harold M. Love Sr. and Mary Y. Love. He is the youngest of five children and the only son. Love was educated in Metro Nashville Public Schools and graduated with honors from Whites Creek High School in 1990. He received his Bachelor's in economics and finance with a minor in political science in 1998 from Tennessee State University, a master's degree in theological studies from Vanderbilt University School of Divinity in 1994 and a Ph.D. in public policy and administration from Tennessee State University in 2017. While in undergraduate school, he marched in the Aristocrat of Bands and is a member of Rho Psi chapter of Omega Psi Phi fraternity.

== Career ==
Love began serving in the Tennessee House of Representatives for the 58th District in 2012. He serves on the following House Committees: Finance Ways and Means, Insurance, TennCare Subcommittee. In addition he serves on the Tennessee Advisory Commission for Intergovernmental Relations(TACIR) and the Tennessee Second Look Commission.

Love was ordained by the African Methodist Episcopal Church (A.M.E.) Church in 1999 and was assigned to Pastor Hopewell A.M.E. Church in Columbia, Tennessee. From October 2002 to November 2016, he was the pastor of St. Paul A.M.E. Church in Nashville, Tennessee, and in 2015 was also the Presiding Elder of the South Nashville District of the A.M.E. Church. On November 21, 2016, he was appointed pastor of Lee Chapel A.M.E. Church in Nashville, Tennessee.

== Personal life ==
Love is married to the former Leah Dupree, who is an attorney. The couple resides in North Nashville.
