= Orianna Andrews =

American physician

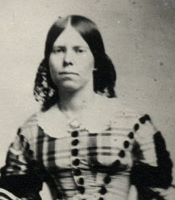
- Born: Orianna Moon; 1834; Albemarle County, Virginia
- Died: 1883 (aged 48–49); Albemarle County, Virginia
- Occupation: Medical doctor
- Years active: 1857–1883
- Spouse: John Summerfield Andrews
- Relatives: Lottie Moon (sister)

Orianna Moon Andrews (1834–1883) was an American medical doctor who was one of the first women in America to hold a medical degree. She served as a doctor for the Confederate Army during the American Civil War.

== Early life and education ==
Born in 1834 in Albemarle County, Virginia, to a plantation-owning family, Orianna Andrews (nee Moon) decided to study medicine from an early age. She attended the Troy Female Seminary (now the Emma Willard School) for a year, which provided the required courses in sciences and mathematics to allow her to enroll in the Female Medical College of Pennsylvania (now the Woman's Medical College of Pennsylvania). This was in the College's fourth induction of students. Andrews was the first woman from Virginia to attend the college, and only the third woman from the Southern United States.

Andrews submitted her doctoral thesis in 1856 and graduated the following year. At the time, she was one of 38 women who had earned medical degrees in the United States.

== Career ==
After earning her medical degree, Andrews spent two years traveling in the Middle East and Europe, before returning to North America in 1861 around the beginning of the American Civil War. She wrote to the military commanders of Virginia, offering her skills to the war effort of the Confederate States of America.

Andrews was employed as the superintendent of a team of nurses in a makeshift hospital at the University of Virginia. She wrote to Brigadier General Philip St. George Cocke asking to be moved to the front, and her sister Lottie Moon wrote to him in support as well. She was not moved, but instead left the service when she married Dr. John Summerfield Andrews in November 1861. They moved to Richmond, Virginia, and worked in a Confederate Army hospital. She returned to Albemarle County to give birth to her first son in the following year.

They moved to Tennessee after the war, but returned to Albemarle County following an altercation with the Ku Klux Klan. Back in the county of her birth, the couple set up a joint medical practice. Andrews died of cancer in 1883. At the time of her death, Andrews had six living sons, although another six children had died in childhood.
