= Charles Pruitt =

American politician

Member of the Tennessee House of Representatives from the 58th district
- In office 1970–1985
- Succeeded by: Charles J. Walker

Personal details
- Born: May 28, 1930 Huntsville, Alabama, US
- Died: August 5, 1985 (aged 55) Nashville, Tennessee, US
- Party: Democratic
- Spouse: Mary Johnson (m. 1960)
- Children: 3

Charles W. Pruitt (May 28, 1930 – August 5, 1985) was an American politician and Tennessee State Representative from Nashville, representing the 58th district from 1970 until 1985.

Pruitt was born and raised in Huntsville, Alabama and moved to Nashville, Tennessee in 1949. He married Mary Johnson in 1960 and had three children. Pruitt was employed by the Western Electric Company. Pruitt died of a heart attack in 1985, while still in office. His vacant seat was first filled by Charles J. Walker, appointed by the Metro Council, then by his widow Mary after a special election held October 15, 1985.
