= Checked tone =

Syllable type in the phonology in Middle Chinese

- Traditional Chinese: 入聲
- Simplified Chinese: 入声
- Literal meaning: the tone of character 入 'entering' tone
Transcriptions
Standard Mandarin
- Hanyu Pinyin: rùshēng
- Wade–Giles: ju^{4}-shêng^{1}
Yue: Cantonese
- Yale Romanization: yahpsīng
- Jyutping: jap6 sing1
- IPA: [jɐp̚˨.sɪŋ˥]
Southern Min
- Hokkien POJ: ji̍p-siaⁿ / li̍p-siaⁿ
- Tâi-lô: ji̍p-siann / li̍p-siann

Alternative Chinese name
- Traditional Chinese: 促聲
- Simplified Chinese: 促声
- Literal meaning: the hurried tone
Transcriptions
Standard Mandarin
- Hanyu Pinyin: cùshēng
- Wade–Giles: ts'u^{4}-shêng^{1}
Yue: Cantonese
- Yale Romanization: chūksīng
- Jyutping: cuk1 sing1
- IPA: [tsʰʊk̚˥.sɪŋ˥]

A checked tone, commonly known by the Chinese calque entering tone, is one of the four syllable types in the phonology of Middle Chinese. Although usually translated as "tone", a checked tone is not a tone in the western phonetic sense but rather a type of syllable that ends in a stop consonant or a glottal stop. Separating the checked tone allows -p, -t, and -k to be treated as allophones of -m, -n, and -ng, respectively, since they are in complementary distribution. Stops appear only in the checked tone, and nasals appear only in the other tones. Because of the origin of tone in Chinese, the number of tones found in such syllables is smaller than the number of tones in other syllables. Chinese phonetics have traditionally counted them separately.

Final voiceless stops and therefore the checked "tones" have disappeared from most Mandarin dialects, spoken in northern and southwestern China, but have been preserved in southeastern Chinese branches like Nanjing Mandarin, Yue, Min, and Hakka.

According to Zhang Taiyan, an advocate of Old National Pronunciation, checked tone is a signature of Han culture. Tones are an indispensable part of Chinese literature, as characters in poetry and prose were chosen according to tones and rhymes for their euphony. This use of language helps reconstructing Old Chinese and Middle Chinese pronunciations since Chinese writing system is logographic, rather than phonetic.

== Phonetics ==
From a phonetic perspective, the prototypical entering tone is simply a syllable ending with a voiceless stop that has no audible release: [p̚], [t̚], [k̚], and/or a glottal stop [ʔ̚] depending on the language variety. Middle Chinese has only the first three.

It is customarily called a tone regardless of whether a tonal distinction is possible in such syllables. In languages such as Early Middle Chinese and most varieties of Wu, such syllables do not have contrastive tones (i.e. the tone or pitch of the syllable is entirely predictable) and are therefore phonologically toneless. In languages such as Cantonese or Hakka, a small number of tonal distinctions exist (typically 2), which historically developed as a substitute for the lost Middle Chinese initial voicing.

Some Chinese varieties have innovated new final consonants from such historical syllables. A few dialects of Gan have [l] (from historical [t̚]). In some dialects of Cantonese and Gan, the final stop is voiced.

== History ==
The voiceless stops that typify the entering tone date back to the Proto-Sino-Tibetan, the parent language of Chinese as well as the Tibeto-Burman languages. In addition, Old Chinese is commonly thought to have syllables ending in clusters /ps/, /ts/, and /ks/ (sometimes called the "long entering tone" while syllables ending in /p/, /t/ and /k/ are the "short entering tone"). Such clusters were later reduced to /s/, which, in turn, became /h/ and ultimately "departing tone" in Middle Chinese.

The first Chinese philologists began to describe the phonology of Chinese during the Early Middle Chinese period (specifically, during the Northern and Southern dynasties, between 400 and 600 AD), under the influence of Buddhism and the Sanskrit language that arrived along with it. There were several unsuccessful attempts to classify the tones of Chinese before the establishment of the traditional four-tone description between 483 and 493. It is based on the Vedic theory of three intonations (聲明論). The middle intonation, udātta, maps to the "level tone" (平聲); the upwards intonation, svarita, to the "rising tone" (上聲); the downward intonation, anudātta, to the "departing tone" (去聲). The distinctive sound of syllables ending with a stop did not fit the three intonations and was categorised as the "entering tone" (入聲), thus forming the four-tone system. The use of this system flourished in the Sui and Tang dynasties (7th–10th centuries), during which the Qieyun (Chinese: 切韻) rime dictionary was written.

Note that modern linguistic descriptions of Middle Chinese often refer to the level, rising and departing tones as tones 1, 2 and 3, respectively.

By the time of the Mongol invasion (the Yuan dynasty, 1279–1368), the former final stops had been reduced to a glottal stop /ʔ/ in Old Mandarin. The Zhongyuan Yinyun (中原音韻), a rime book of 1324, already shows signs of glottal stop disappearing and the modern Mandarin tone system emerging in its place. The precise time at which the loss occurred is unknown though it was likely gone by the time of the Qing dynasty, in the 17th century.

== Example ==
Chinese character	Fanqie spelling and Middle Chinese reconstruction	Modern varieties of Chinese having entering tone					Sino-Xenic pronunciations			Standard Mandarin (no entering tone)	Gloss
Chinese character	Fanqie spelling and Middle Chinese reconstruction	Hakka	Min (Fuzhou dialect)	Jianghuai Mandarin (Nanjing dialect)	Wu (Ningbo dialect)	Yue (Cantonese)	Classical Japanese	Korean	Vietnamese	Standard Mandarin (no entering tone)	Gloss
合	侯閤切 [ɣɒp]	[hap˥]	[haʔ˥]	ho⁵ [xoʔ˥]	[ɦɐʔ˩˨]	[hɐp˨]	ガフ gapu カフ kapu	합 hap	hợp / hạp	hé [xɤ̌]	'union', 'close'
十	是執切 [ʑĭĕp]	[sip˥]	[sɛiʔ˥]	shr⁵ [ʂʅʔ˥]	[zʷœʔ˩˨]	[sɐp˨]	ジフ zipu シフ sipu	십 sip	thập	shí [ʂɨ̌]	'ten'
佛	符弗切 [bʰĭuət]	[fut˥]	[huʔ˥]	fu⁵ [fuʔ˥]	[vɐʔ˩˨]	[fɐt˨]	ブツ butu フツ putu	불 bul	phật	fó [fuɔ̌]	'Buddha'
八	博拔切 [pæt]	[pat˩]	[paiʔ˨˦]	ba⁵ [paʔ˥]	[pɐʔ˥]	[paːt˧]	ハチ pati ハツ patu	팔 pal	bát	bā [pá]	'eight'
易	羊益切 [jĭɛk]	[ji˥˧], [jit˥]	[iʔ˥]	i⁵ [iʔ˥]	[ji˦], [jeʔ˩˨]	[jɪk˨]	ヤク yaku エキ eki	역 yeok	dịch	yì [î]	'change', 'exchange'
客	苦格切 [kʰɐk]	[hak˩],[kʰak˩]	[kʰaʔ˨˦]	kä⁵ [kʰɛʔ˥]	[kʰɐʔ˥]	[haːk˧]	キャク kyaku カク kaku	객 gaek	khách	kè [kʰɤ̂]	'guest'

怒髮衝冠，憑欄處，瀟瀟雨歇 [xĭɐt]；
抬望眼，仰天長嘯，壯懷激烈 [lĭɛt]。
三十功名塵與土，八千里路雲和月 [ŋĭwɐt]；
莫等閒，白了少年頭，空悲切 [ʦʰiet]。

靖康恥，猶未雪 [sĭuɛt]；
臣子恨，何時滅 [mĭɛt]。
駕長車，踏破賀蘭山缺 [kʰĭuɛt]；
壯志飢餐胡虜肉，笑談渴飲匈奴血 [xiwet]。
待從頭，收拾舊山河，朝天闕 [kʰĭwɐt]！

— Yue Fei, Full River of Red (滿江紅)

== Entering tone in Chinese ==
=== Mandarin ===
The entering tone is extant in Jianghuai Mandarin and Minjiang Sichuanese. Other dialects have lost the entering tone, and syllables that had the tone have been distributed into the four modern tonal categories, depending on their initial consonants.

The Beijing dialect that forms the basis of Standard Mandarin redistributed syllables beginning with originally unvoiced consonants across the four tones in a completely random pattern. For example, the three characters 积脊迹, all pronounced /tsjek/ in Middle Chinese (William Baxter's reconstruction), are now pronounced jī jǐ jì, with tones 1, 3 and 4 respectively. The two characters 割／葛, both pronounced /kat/, are now pronounced gē and gé/gě respectively, with the character 葛 splitting on semantic grounds (tone 3 when it is used as a component of a name, mostly tone 2 otherwise).

Similarly, the three characters 胳阁各 (MC /kak/) are now pronounced gē gé gè. The four characters 鸽蛤颌合 (MC /kop/) are now pronounced gē gé gé gě.

In those cases, the two sets of characters are significant in that each member of the same set has the same phonetic component, suggesting that the phonetic component of a character has little to do with the tone class that the character is assigned to.

In other situations, however, the opposite appears to be the case. For example, the group 幅福蝠辐／腹复 of six homophones, all /pjuwk/ in Middle Chinese and divided into a group of four with one phonetic and a group of two with a different phonetic, splits so that the first group of four is all pronounced fú and the second group of two is pronounced fù. Situations like this may result from the fact that only one of the characters in each group normally occurs in speech with an identifiable tone, and as a result, a "literary pronunciation" of the other characters was constructed based on the phonetic element of that character.

The chart below summarizes the distribution in the different dialects.

Mandarin dialect	Voiceless	nasal or /l/	Voiced obstruent
Peninsular / Jiao-Liao	3	4	2
Northeastern	1, 2, 3, 4 (mostly 3, irregular)	4	2
Beijing	1, 2, 3, 4 (no obvious pattern)	4	2
North-Central / Ji-Lu	1	4	2
Central Plains	1		2
Northwestern / Lan-Yin	4		2
Southwestern	2 (mainly), 1, 4 or preserved (Minjiang dialect)		
Yangtze/Jianghuai	entering tone preserved		

==== Identifying checked tones in Modern Standard Mandarin ====
There are several conditions that can be used to determine if a character historically had a checked tone in Middle Chinese based on its current reading in Modern Standard Mandarin. However, there are many characters, such as 切, 塔, 六, 刻 and 骨 which do not satisfy any of these conditions at all.

Initial	Final	Tone	Exceptions
Tenuis obstruent: b, d, g, j, zh, z (ㄅ, ㄉ, ㄍ, ㄐ, ㄓ, ㄗ)	Non-nasal final	Second tone	鼻, 值
Alveolar consonant: d, t, n, l, z, c, s (ㄉ, ㄊ, ㄋ, ㄌ, ㄗ, ㄘ, ㄙ) or r (ㄖ)	e (ㄜ)	Any	呢, 眲, 若 (般~), 惹
Velar consonant: g, k, h (ㄍ, ㄎ, ㄏ); Retroflex consonant: zh, ch, sh, r (ㄓ, ㄔ, ㄕ, ㄖ)	uo (ㄨㄛ)	Any	咼 (渦, 堝, 過, 鍋, 禍) 果 (猓, 粿, 裹, 蜾, 輠, 餜, 夥) 火, 和 (~麵), 貨
Bilabial consonant: b, p, m (ㄅ, ㄆ, ㄇ); Alveolar non-sibilant consonant: d, t, n, l (ㄉ, ㄊ, ㄋ, ㄌ)	ie (ㄧㄝ)	Any	爹, 咩
Non-labial tenuis obstruent: d, g, z (ㄉ, ㄍ, ㄗ); Non-labial fricative: h, s (ㄏ, ㄙ)	ei (ㄟ)	Any	這, 誰
f (ㄈ)	a, o (ㄚ, ㄛ)	Any	
Alveolar sibilant: z, c, s (ㄗ, ㄘ, ㄙ)	a (ㄚ)	Any	仨, 灑
Any	üe (ㄩㄝ)	Any	嗟's variant reading of juē, 靴, 瘸

- A character with a nasal final /-n/, /-ŋ/ in Modern Standard Mandarin will not have the checked tone in Middle Chinese. (The only exception is 廿; niàn.)
- A character with the sibilant final /-ɿ/ in Standard Chinese, i.e. those with initials z-, c-, s- and final -i, will not have the checked tone in Middle Chinese.
- A character with the final -uai or -uei in Modern Standard Mandarin will typically not have the checked tone in Middle Chinese. (Exceptions: 率; shuài, and others)
- A character with a tenuis obstruent initial (pinyin: b, d, g, j, z, zh, z）in Standard Mandarin and the third tone will typically not have the checked tone in Middle Chinese. (Exceptions: 百; bǎi, 葛; gě when used as a surname, 骨; gǔ, 角; jiǎo, 窄; zhǎi, among others)
- Characters that begin with an unaspirated obstruent and end in a nasal final (n or ng) in Mandarin almost never have light level tone (or second tone in Modern Standard Mandarin, marked in pinyin with an acute accent). This is a corollary of the first condition in the table above, where characters that begin with an unaspirated obstruent (pinyin b, d, g, j, z, zh), end in a vowel, and have a light level tone (阳平) in Mandarin (corresponding to a rising tone in Standard Mandarin) almost always derive from an entering tone (e.g. 德; dé, 革; gé, 絕绝; jué, 雜/杂; zá and 宅; zhái all come from entering tones). As such, *gáng and *zún are not recognised syllables in Standard Chinese.
- If a character has a phonetic component that is known to have an entering tone, other characters that have that phonetic component probably have an entering tone. For example, if one already knows that 白; 'white' has entering tone, one can conjecture (correctly) that 拍; 'to beat', 柏; 'fir', 帛; 'white cloth', 迫; 'urgent' also have entering tone. However, there are plenty of exceptions, such as 怕; 'afraid' and 扒; 'to cling to'', ''to gather up', which lack the entering tone. (Note: These exceptions often originate from obstruent + s final clusters in Old Chinese, whereby the s at the end becomes the departing tone during the transition to Middle Chinese, but also causes the stop before it to disappear.)

=== Wu ===
Most varieties of Wu Chinese preserve the entering tone. However, no contemporary Wu varieties preserve the /p/, /t/ or /k/ distinction, but instead merges them all into a glottal stop /ʔ/. For example, in Shanghainese, the three lexemes 濕／湿; 'wet', 失; 'lose', 塞; 'block', historically ending in /p/, /t/ and /k/, all end in a glottal stop, and are pronounced seq /səʔ⁵⁵/.

In some modern Wu varieties such as Wenzhounese, even the glottal stop has disappeared, and the entering tone is preserved as separate tone, with a falling-rising contour, making it unequivocally a phonemic tone in modern linguistics.

The pitch of the entering tones are divided into two registers, depending on the initials:

- "dark entering" (陰入), a high-pitched checked tone, with a voiceless initial.
- "light entering" (陽入), a low-pitched checked tone, with a voiced initial.

Many terms with grammatical functions also undergo sporadic evolution and gain a checked tone. This process can be considered a form of lenition, and is sometimes considered a form of glottalization.

Term	Gloss	Wu										Non-Wu			
Term	Gloss	Shanghai	Suzhou	Ningbo	Jinhua	Chongming	Changzhou	Wuxi	Jiaxing	Tiantai	Hangzhou	Beijing	Guangzhou	Nanchang	Xining
阿	diminuitive	aq⁷ /aʔ꜆/	aeq⁷ /aʔ꜆/	aq⁷ /ɐʔ꜆/	eq⁷ /əʔ꜆/	aeq⁷ /æʔ꜆/	aq⁷ /aʔ꜆/	aq⁷ /aʔ꜆/	aq⁷ /ɑʔ꜆/	aq⁷ /aʔ꜆/	aq⁷ /ɑʔ꜆/	a /a/	aa³ /a꜄/	/꜀ŋa/	/꜀a/
個	possessive	gheq⁸ /ɦəʔ꜇/	keq⁷ /kəʔ꜆/	goq⁸ /ɡoʔ꜇/	keq⁷ /kəʔ꜆/	geq⁸ /ɡəʔ꜇/	geq⁸ /ɡəʔ꜇/	keq⁷ /kəʔ꜆/	keq⁷ /kəʔ꜆/	koq⁷ /koʔ꜆/	koq⁷ /koʔ꜆/	gè /kɤ꜄/	ko³ /kɔ꜄/	/ko꜄/	/kɔ꜄/

Romanization used is Wugniu. This phenomenon can also be seen in many pronouns, such as Shanghainese aq-la (阿拉, "we") and Yuyaonese ⁸geq-laq₈ (搿辣, "they").

=== Cantonese ===
In general, Cantonese preserves the Middle Chinese finals intact, including the differentiation between -p, -t and -k final consonants. Standard Cantonese does not use any glottal stops as final consonants; an exception is the sentence suffix 嘞 (laak).

There are a few isolated cases where the final consonant has changed as a result of final dissimilation, but they remain in the checked tone.

Chinese character	Middle Chinese (Baxter)	Standard Cantonese (Jyutping)	Hakka (PFS)	Sino-Korean	Sino-Vietnamese
法	pjop	faat^{3}	fap	법 (beop)	pháp
乏	bjop	fat^{6}	fa̍t	핍 (pip)	phạp

Like most other Chinese variants, Cantonese has changed initial voiced stops, affricates and fricatives of Middle Chinese to their voiceless counterparts. To compensate for losing that difference, Cantonese has split each Middle Chinese tones into two, one for Middle Chinese voiced initial consonants (light) and one for Middle Chinese voiceless initial consonants (dark). In addition, Cantonese has split the dark-entering tone into two, with a higher tone for short vowels and a lower tone for long vowels. As a result, Cantonese now has three entering tones:

- Upper dark entering / short dark entering (上陰入/短陰入)
- Lower dark entering / long middle entering (下陰入/長中入)
- Light entering (陽入)

Some variants of Yue Chinese, notably including that of Bobai County (Chinese: 博白; pinyin: Bóbái) in Guangxi and Yangjiang (simplified Chinese: 阳江; traditional Chinese: 陽江; pinyin: Yángjiāng; Cantonese Yale: Yèuhnggōng) in Guangdong, have four entering tones: the lower light tone is also differentiated according to vowel length, short vowels for upper light and long vowels for lower light. Thus in such varieties:

- Upper dark entering / short dark entering (上陰入/短陰入)
- Lower dark entering / long middle entering (下陰入/長中入)
- Upper light entering / short light entering (上陽入/中入/短陽入)
- Lower light entering / long light entering (下陽入/長陽入)

Chinese character	Middle Chinese (Baxter)	Standard Cantonese (Jyutping)	Vowel length in standard Cantonese	Bobai dialect (IPA)	Sino-Vietnamese
北	pok	bak^{1}	short	/paʔ^{55}/	bắc
百	paek	baak^{3}	long	/pak^{33}/	bách
薄	bak	bok^{6}	short	/pɔk^{22}/	bạc
白	baek	baak^{6}	long	/pak^{22}/	bạch
竹	tsyowk	zuk^{1}	short (the final -uk /ʊk̚/ does not distinguish long from short)	/tʃuk^{55}/	trúc
捉	tsraewk	zuk^{3}, zuk^{1}	short (the final -uk /ʊk̚/ does not distinguish long from short)	/tʃɔk^{33}/	tróc
鐲	dzyowk, draewk	zuk^{6}	short (the final -uk /ʊk̚/ does not distinguish long from short)	/tʃɔk^{22}/	trạc
濁	draewk	zuk^{6}	short (the final -uk /ʊk̚/ does not distinguish long from short)	/tʃɔk^{11}/	trọc

=== Hakka ===
Hakka preserves all Middle Chinese entering tones and is split into two registers. Meixian Hakka dialect often taken as the paradigm gives the following:

- "dark entering" (陰入) [ ˩ ], a low-pitched checked tone
- "light entering" (陽入) [ ˥ ], a high-pitched checked tone

Middle Chinese entering tone syllables ending in [k] whose vowel clusters have become front high vowels like [i] and [ɛ] shifts to syllables with [t] finals in some of the modern Hakka, as seen in the following table.

Character	Guangyun fanqie	Middle Chinese reconstruction	Hakka Chinese	Gloss
職	之翼切	tɕĭək	tsit˩	vocation, profession
力	林直切	lĭək	lit˥	strength, power
食	乗力切	dʑʰĭək	sit˥	eat, consume
色	所力切	ʃĭək	sɛt˩	colour, hue
德	多則切	tək	tɛt˩	virtue
刻	苦得切	kʰək	kʰɛt˩	carve, engrave, a moment
北	博墨切	pək	pɛt˩	north
國	古或切	kuək	kʷɛt˩	country, state

=== Min ===
Southern Min (Minnan, including Taiwanese) has two entering tones:

- Upper (dark, 陰入), also numbered tone 4
- Lower (light, 陽入), tone 8

A word may switch from one tone to the other by tone sandhi. Words with entering tones end with a glottal stop ([-ʔ]), [-p], [-t] or [-k] (all unaspirated). There are many words that have different finals in their literary and colloquial forms.

Eastern Min, as exemplified by Fuzhounese, also has two entering tones:

- Upper/dark entering, 陰入, which in Fuzhounese has the tonal value /˨˦/ and ends in the glottal stop /ʔ/. This tone contour is not shared with any other tone category.
- Lower/light entering, 陽入, which in Fuzhounese has the tonal value /˥/ and also ends in the glottal stop /ʔ/.

Within its complex tone sandhi laws, Fuzhounese has a split in sandhi behavior between two separate upper/dark entering 陰入 tones. This is believed to be a reflex of an earlier stage in its development, where final /k/ was distinguished from final /ʔ/.

In the related Fuqing dialect, a proportion of entering tone lexemes have lost their glottal stop and have merged into the phonetically equivalent tones:

- Upper/dark entering, 陰入, with value /˨˩/, is merging into upper/dark departing, 陰去, with value /˨˩/.
- Lower/light entering, 陽入, with value /˥/, is merging into upper/dark level, 陰平, with value /˥˧/.

Outcomes of Glottal Stop Retention in Fuzhou vs Loss in Fuqing
Historical Entering Tone	Dark entering (陰入)			Light entering (陽入)			
Entering Tone Character	隔	索	曲	石	糴	畫	挃
Fuzhou dialect (colloquial reading)	gáh kɑʔ˨˦	só̤h sɔʔ˨˦	kuóh kʰuɔʔ˨˦	siŏh suoʔ˥	diăh/diĕh tieʔ˥	uăh uaʔ˥	dĭk tiʔ˥
Historical Other Tone	Dark departing (陰去)			Dark level (陰平)			
Other Tone Character	教	燥	課	輸	爹	蛙	蜘
Fuzhou dialect (colloquial reading)	gá kɑ˨˩˧	só̤ sɔ˨˩˧	kuó kʰuɔ˨˩˧	suŏ suo˥	diă/diĕ tie˥	uă ua˥	dĭ/tĭ ti˥
Fuqing dialect (colloquial reading)	kɑ˨˩	θɔ˨˩	kʰuɔ˨˩	θyo˥˧	tia˥˧	ua˥˧	ti˥˧

This merger can also affect sandhi environments, but there is the option to use the sandhi pattern of the former checked tone. Although the final glottal stop is still eliminated, the post-sandhi tone differs to that of a non-checked tone.

Additionally in Fuqingnese, sandhi environments where the light entering 陽入 tone is non-final cause the glottal stop to weaken and in some tones to be lost, and where the tone changes to a low sandhi tone /˨˩/, the glottal stop is completely lost. The dark entering 陰入 tone on the other hand retains its glottal stop in sandhi environments.

== Entering tone in Sino-Xenic ==
Many Chinese words were borrowed into Japanese, Korean and Vietnamese during the Middle Chinese period so they preserve the entering tone to varying degrees.

=== Japanese ===
Because Japanese does not allow a syllable to end with a consonant except ん n, the endings -k, -p, -t were rendered as separate syllables -ku or -ki, -pu, and -ti (Modern -chi) or -tu (Modern -tsu) respectively. Later phonological changes further altered some of the endings:

- In some cases in which the ending is immediately followed by an unvoiced consonant in a compound, the inserted vowel ending is lost, and the consonant becomes geminate.
  - Examples: 学, gaku + 校, kau (> Modern Japanese kō) becomes 学校, gakkō, 'school', and 突, totu + 破, pa (> Modern Japanese ha when standing alone) becomes 突破, toppa (breakthrough)
- The -pu ending changes into -u. (pu > fu > hu > u). That process can be followed by -au > - ō and -iu > -yū.
  - Example: 十, zipu, 'ten' becomes jū (phonologically zyū)

Recovering the original ending is possible by examining the historical kana used in spelling a word, which has also aided scholars in reconstructing historical Chinese pronunciation.

=== Korean ===
Korean keeps the -k and -p endings while the -t ending is represented as -l (tapped -r-, [ɾ], if intervocalic) as Sino-Korean derives from a northern variety of Late Middle Chinese where final -t had weakened to [r].

=== Vietnamese ===
Vietnamese preserves all endings /p/, /t/ and /k/ (spelt -c). Additionally, after the vowels ê or i, the ending -c changes to -ch, giving rise to -ich and -êch, and ach (pronounced /ajk/) also occurs for some words ending with -k.

Only the sắc and nặng tones are allowed on checked tones. In Sino-Vietnamese vocabulary, those tones were split from the Middle Chinese "entering" tone in a similar fashion to Cantonese. Whether the syllable tone should be sắc or nặng depends on the original Middle Chinese syllable's initial consonant voicing.

Chinese character	Middle Chinese reconstruction	Vietnamese
百	[pɐk] (voiceless initial)	bách
白	[bʰɐk] (voiced initial)	bạch
室	[ɕĭĕt] (voiceless initial)	thất
實	[dʑʰĭĕt] (voiced initial)	thật
一	[ʔĭĕt] (voiceless initial)	nhất
日	[nʑĭĕt] (voiced initial)	nhật
密	[mĭĕt] (voiced initial)	mật
佛	[bʰĭuət] (voiced initial)	phật
屈	[kĭuət] (voiceless initial)	khuất or quật

== See also ==
- Historical Chinese phonology
- Sino-Japanese vocabulary
- Sino-Korean vocabulary
- Sino-Vietnamese vocabulary
- Tone name
