= Huzhou dialect =

Variety of Wu Chinese spoken in Huzhou, China

Huzhounese
- Huzhou dialect
- 湖州闲话; 湖州閒話; ghou-cieu-ghe-o
- Pronunciation: [ɦə̀u tɕiʏ̀ ɦè ó]
- Native to: People's Republic of China
- Region: Huzhou
- Language family: Sino-Tibetan: Sinitic; Chinese; Wu; Northern Wu; Suhujia/Tiaoxi; Huzhounese

Language codes
- ISO 639-3: –
- Glottolog: huzh1239

Huzhounese, or the Huzhou dialect (simplified Chinese: 湖州话; traditional Chinese: 湖州話; pinyin: Húzhōuhuà, known locally as 湖州闲话; 湖州閒話), is a variety of Wu Chinese spoken in the city of Huzhou, Zhejiang. It belongs to either the Suhujia (蘇湖嘉) or Tiaoxi (also spelt Shaoxi, 苕溪) cluster of Northern Wu, making it highly mutually intelligible with other Northern Wu varieties such as Suzhounese and Shanghainese.

== Phonology ==
The romanization used henceforth is Wugniu. For cross-linguistic information, see Northern Wu phonology.

== Initials ==
Initial Consonants
		Labial	Dental/ Alveolar	Palatal	Velar	Glottal
Nasal		m ⟨m⟩	n ⟨n⟩	ɲ ⟨gn⟩	ŋ ⟨ng⟩	
Plosive	plain	p ⟨p⟩	t ⟨t⟩		k ⟨k⟩	(ʔ)
Plosive	aspirated	pʰ ⟨ph⟩	tʰ ⟨th⟩		kʰ ⟨kh⟩	
Plosive	voiced	b ⟨b⟩	d ⟨d⟩		ɡ ⟨g⟩	
Affricate	plain		ts ⟨ts⟩	tɕ ⟨c⟩		
Affricate	aspirated		tsʰ ⟨tsh⟩	tɕʰ ⟨ch⟩		
Affricate	voiced		dz (dz)	dʑ ⟨j⟩		
Fricative	voiceless	f ⟨f⟩	s ⟨s⟩	ɕ ⟨sh⟩		h ⟨h⟩
Fricative	voiced	v ⟨v⟩	z ⟨z⟩			ɦ ⟨gh⟩, ⟨y⟩, ⟨w⟩
Lateral			l ⟨l⟩			

Much like other Northern Wu varieties, all voiced phones in Huzhounese carry breathy voice. Sonorants can further be realised with glottalization when paired with dark (陰) tones. The voiced glottal fricative /ɦ/ and null initial form a voicing pair, though unlike other Northern Wu varieties, this initial cannot co-occur with the light rising (陽上) and light departing (陽去) tones, instead only truly surfacing when co-occurring with the light level (陽平) and light checked (陽入) tones. Compare 號: Huzhounese au^{5}, Shanghainese ghau^{6}, Ningbonese ghau^{6}.

Alveolo-palatals, when appearing before -ieu, has been suggested to instead be realised as postalveolars [tʃ tʃʰ dʒ ʃ ʒ]. Note that this is fed by the frication of -ieu.

== Finals ==
Final rimes
Medial	Nucleus														
Medial	∅	a	ɔ	o	ʏ	e	ei	əu	ã	ɑ̃	ən	oŋ	aʔ	oʔ	əʔ
∅	ɿ ⟨y⟩	a ⟨a⟩	ɔ ⟨au⟩	o ⟨o⟩	øʏ ⟨eu⟩	e ⟨e⟩	ei ⟨ei⟩	əu ⟨ou⟩	ã ⟨an⟩	ɑ̃ ⟨aon⟩	ən ⟨en⟩	oŋ ⟨on⟩	aʔ ⟨aq⟩	oʔ ⟨oq⟩	əʔ ⟨eq⟩
i	i ⟨i⟩	ia ⟨ia⟩	iɔ ⟨iau⟩		iʏ ⟨ieu⟩	ie ⟨ie⟩			iã ⟨ian⟩	iɑ̃ ⟨iaon⟩	in ⟨in⟩	ioŋ ⟨ion⟩	iaʔ ⟨iaq⟩	ioʔ ⟨ioq⟩	iɪʔ ⟨iq⟩
u	u ⟨u⟩	ua ⟨ua⟩				ue ⟨ue⟩	uei ⟨uei⟩		uã ⟨uan⟩	uɑ̃ ⟨uaon⟩	uən ⟨uen⟩		uaʔ ⟨uaq⟩		uəʔ ⟨ueq⟩

Huzhounese also has liquid rimes /əl ~ ɚ/, /m/, /n/, and /ŋ/.

The transcriptions above are broad and primarily based on that of Akamatsu (1991). The following are some phonetic and phonotactic notes regarding the rimes.

- There appears to be a chain shift in some speakers where -i merged with -y, subsequently leading to -ie being realised as /i/.
- -ie itself can be realised as [iɪ].
- -ieu similarly may be fricated, yielding [ʯ].
- There is significant rounding recorded in the -aon rime series, yielding [ɒ̃ ~ ɔ̃].
- -ei has large variation in realisation from speaker to speaker, with, for instance, [əi] and [eɨ], both being valid realisations.
- The nasal element of the rimes -en, -in, and -uen is in free variation with [ŋ].
- The nucleus of the -e rime series can be lowered to [ɛ].
- The nucleus of the -a rime series can be backed.

== Tones ==
Monosyllable tones
Wugniu	Category	Value
1	Dark level (陰平)	˦ 44
2	Light level (陽平)	˩˨ 12
3	Dark rising (陰上)	˦˨ 42
4	Light rising (陽上)	˧˩ 31
5	Dark departing (陰去)	˧˥ 35
6	Light departing (陽去)	˨˦ 24
7	Dark checked (陰入)	˥ 5
8	Light checked (陽入)	˨˧ 23

In general, light tones only appear with voiced initials, whereas dark tones only appear with voiceless initials. Note, however, that sonorants tend to appear with dark instead of light tones. Further notes are as follows:

- The realization of the two rising tones and two departing tones are often very similar, at times even indistinguishable.
- There is a slight rise at the end of the two rising tones, i.e. [˦˨˧] 423 and [˧˩˨] 312.
- The light level and dark departing tones are in reality lengthened, yielding [˩˩˧] 113 and [˧˧˥] 335 respectively.
- The two checked tones can in fact be overlong for emphasis, yielding [˥˧˦] 534 and [˩˩˧] 113.

=== Tone sandhi ===
Like other Northern Wu varieties, Huzhounese has a complex system of tone sandhi. Bisyllabic chain patterns are as follows. Columns show the underlying tone category of the first syllabe, whereas rows show the underlying tone category of the second syllable.

Monosyllable tones
	1	2	3	4	5	6	7	8
1	44 44 ˦ ˦						44 4 ˦ ˦	
2	11 23 ˩ ˨˧						11 23 ˩ ˨˧	
3	42 23 ˦˨ ˨˧						42 23 ˦˨ ˨˧	
4	33 11 ˧ ˩			33 11 ˧ ˩	33 11 ˧ ˩		33 1 ˧ ˩	
4	33 11 ˧ ˩			11 31 ˩ ˧˩	33 11 ˧ ˩		33 1 ˧ ˩	
5	33 35 ˧ ˧˥						33 35 ˧ ˧˥	
6	21 24 ˨˩ ˨˦				21 24 ˨˩ ˨˦		21 24 ˨˩ ˨˦	
6	21 24 ˨˩ ˨˦				21 53 ˨˩ ˥˧		21 24 ˨˩ ˨˦	
7	3 55 ˧ ˥	3 53 ˧ ˥˧			5 23 ˥ ˨˧		3 53 ˧ ˥˧	
8	1 44 ˩ ˦				1 44 ˩ ˦		1 4 ˩ ˦	
8	1 44 ˩ ˦				3 12 ˧ ˩˨		1 4 ˩ ˦	
