= Northern Wu phonology =

Sound system of a Wu Chinese subbranch

Northern Wu, or Taihu Wu, is the largest subbranch of Wu Chinese, and is spoken in Shanghai, southern Jiangsu, and northern Zhejiang. These languages are noted for their extremely high number of vowels, even compared to some Germanic languages, and highly complex tone sandhi. This article will use Wugniu and IPA for transcription.

== Syllable structure ==
Much like other Sinitic languages, Northern Wu languages almost universally have an initial-final-tone syllable structure. The final can be further split into the glide, nucleus and coda. For the most part, contemporary Northern Wu languages only permit nasals and the glottal stop (/ʔ/) in coda position, though there is evidence to suggest that this was not the case in some historical varieties. There are plentiful initials in Northern Wu, more than many other Sinitic languages such as Cantonese or Changshanese, partially due to the preservation of voiced initials, which will be explained in more detail in other sections.

== Initials ==
Much like other Wu languages, Northern Wu languages tend to preserve historical voiced initials, which is a feature only found in several other lects along the Yangtze River, such as Old Xiang.

Northern Wu languages' initials are generally similar. The following is a table of all the commonly-found Northern Wu phonemic initials, with their common urban realizations, Wugniu romanization, and example syllables.

Initial Consonants
		Labial	Dental/ Alveolar	Palatal	Velar	Glottal
Nasal		m ⟨m⟩ 美悶梅門	n ⟨n⟩ 拿囡內男	ɲ ⟨gn⟩ 粘扭泥牛	ŋ ⟨ng⟩ 砑我外鵝	
Plosive	plain	p ⟨p⟩ 布幫北	t ⟨t⟩ 膽懂德		k ⟨k⟩ 干公夾	(ʔ) 鴨衣烏
Plosive	aspirated	pʰ ⟨ph⟩ 怕胖劈	tʰ ⟨th⟩ 透聽鐵		kʰ ⟨kh⟩ 開擴康	
Plosive	voiced	b ⟨b⟩ 步盆拔	d ⟨d⟩ 地動奪		ɡ ⟨g⟩ 葵共軋	
Affricate	plain		ts ⟨ts⟩ 煮增質	tɕ ⟨c⟩ 舉精腳		
Affricate	aspirated		tsʰ ⟨tsh⟩ 處倉出	tɕʰ ⟨ch⟩ 丘輕切		
Affricate	voiced		dz ⟨dz⟩ 茶從鋤	dʑ ⟨j⟩ 旗羣劇		
Fricative	voiceless	f ⟨f⟩ 飛粉福	s ⟨s⟩ 書松色	ɕ ⟨sh⟩ 修血曉		h ⟨h⟩ 花荒忽
Fricative	voiced	v ⟨v⟩ 扶服浮	z ⟨z⟩ 樹石十	ʑ ⟨zh⟩ 徐秦絕		ɦ ⟨gh⟩, ⟨y⟩, ⟨w⟩ 鞋移胡雨
Lateral			l ⟨l⟩ 拉賴領			

=== Noteworthy omissions ===
Some varieties in Suzhou and Jiaxing have retroflex initials, much like some Mandarin varieties. Compare the following examples.

	Beijing	Changshu	Changzhou	Shengzhou
張	zhāng /tʂaŋ⁵⁵/	can^{1} /tʂaŋ⁵²/	tsan^{1} /tsaŋ⁵⁵/	tsan^{1} /tsã⁵³⁴/
常	cháng /tʂʰaŋ³⁵/	jan^{2} /dʐaŋ³⁴/	zan^{2} /zaŋ²¹³/	dzan^{2} /dzã²¹³/
船	chuán /tʂʰuan³⁵/	zhe^{2} /ʐe³⁴/	zoe^{2} /zɤ²¹³/	zoen^{2} /zœ̃²¹³/

=== Characteristic preservations and innovations ===
Northern Wu, much like other Wu varieties, preserves voicing in its initials. The exact mechanism in which this is realized is discussed below.

Again, much like other Wu languages, Northern Wu preserves the Middle Chinese ri initial (日母) as a nasal. Compare the following, where ⟨gn⟩ is used to notate /ɲ/:

	Beijing	Guangzhou	Xi'an	Seoul (Sino-Korean)	Shanghai	Beilun	Anji
日	rì	jat^{6}	ěr	il	gniq^{8}	gniq^{8}	gniq^{8}
玉	yù	juk^{6}	yǔ	ok	gnioq^{8}, gniuq^{8}	gnioq^{8}	gnioq^{8}

Note that 日 here is pronounced in the colloquial pronunciations rather than literary ones.

==== Palatalization ====
Many Northern Wu varieties have sibilants that undergo palatalization (尖團合流 [zh]). This process is becoming more common among younger speakers.

	Old Suzhou	Old Wuxi	Shanghai	New Suzhou	New Wuxi
精	tsin^{1}	tsin^{1}	cin^{1}	cin^{1}	cin^{1}
經	cin^{1}	cin^{1}	cin^{1}	cin^{1}	cin^{1}
齊	zi^{2}	zi^{6}	zhi^{6}	ji^{6}	ji^{6}
旗	ji^{2}	ji^{6}	ji^{6}	ji^{6}	ji^{6}

=== Depression ===
The voiced initials in Northern Wu languages are realised with breathy voice. This functions much like a phonemic depressor and lowers the pitch of the realization. Some linguists, such as Y. R. Chao, transcribe these phones not as voiced consonants, but as voiceless consonants followed by /ɦ/ or /ʢ/. More recently, potentially due to Standard Mandarin influence, the younger generation has merged the pronunciation of the unaspirated voiceless series with the (breathy) voiced series. However, the functional load of the breathy voice is already relatively low, due to the fact that tonal distribution lends to disambiguation between historically voiced and voiceless syllables. This breathy voice is at times known as "murmur".

Some speakers, particularly in Shanghai, may constrict their throats when pronouncing voiceless (unaspirated) initials to further disambiguate breathy and modal initials. This constriction may result in the pronunciation of an implosive.

==== Implosives ====
In various suburban Shanghainese varieties, the unaspirated voiceless series is realised as implosives. This feature appears to also have been in urban (Puxi) Shanghainese, though it is lost today.

=== Glottal plosive series ===
The glottal fricatives /h/ and /ɦ/ are phonotactically part of a plosive series with /ʔ/. Spectral analyses have found that these three phones show three-way differences parallel to stops. Younger speakers also tend to merge /ɦ/ with /ʔ/, not /h/, as would be expected if it were phonotatically a fricative. As the /ʔ/ has been analyzed as a null initial in the past, it could be said that Northern Wu languages have a three-way null initial contrast.

== Finals ==
Finals vary significantly more than initials in Northern Wu languages. As such, only noteworthy phonological and diachronic features will be discussed. For detailed analyses of individual lects, refer to their specific pages.

=== Characteristic innovations ===
==== Ma raising ====
A feature found in many Wu languages, including Northern Wu, is the raising of the historical ma (麻) rimes. They are typically realised as /o/, though some lects such as Shanghainese or Wuxinese may raise it even higher and having it merge with /u/. The exact sets of words that undergo raising varies from lect to lect, though in general, the southern two branches (Linshao and Yongjiang) have more raising than northern ones.

	Haimen	Qingpu	Wuxi	Tonglu	Ningbo	Beijing
爬	bo^{2}	bo^{2}	bu^{2}	buo^{2}	bo^{2}	pá
茶	dzo^{2}	zo^{2}	zeu^{2}	jiuo^{2}	dzo^{2}	chá
下	gho^{4}	gho^{6}	wu^{6}	wo^{6}	gho^{6}	xià
家	ka^{1}	ka^{1}	ka^{1}	kuo^{1}	ko^{1}	jiā

Notice how the two localities in Zhejiang, Tonglu and Ningbo, both pronounce the word 家 with a raised vowel, whereas those in Jiangsu and Shanghai do not. Northern varieties tend to retain the /a/ value after velars, whereas Linshao and Yongjiang do not.

==== Hou fronting ====
Northern Wu lects along the Grand Canal tend to front the Qieyun Middle Chinese 侯 rime (ie. Wugniu eu). Y. R. Chao suggested that this is due to influence from Hangzhounese. Chao raises the example of 歐洲後頭的狗 "the dog behind Europe", pronounced as [sic] [eitsei ɦeidei kə' kei], taken from his native Changzhounese. Compare Standard Mandarin Ōuzhōu hòutóu de gǒu.

==== Shan and xian rimes ====
The Northern Wu languages exhibit interesting behaviour regarding Qieyun Middle Chinese shan (山) and xian (咸) rimes (ie. Wugniu ae). Some varieties lose the nasal coda completely, whereas others retain it. Some also leave some sporadic nasalization. They typically also have abnormally raised, rounded, or fronted vowels and more complex distribution when compared to other lects, thus resulting in noticeable differences. This behaviour is also exhibited in Hangzhounese.

Correspondence of vernacular Shanghainese readings with Middle Chinese rime classes
Modern reflex	Historical class		Conditions	Examples
Modern reflex	Yunshe (韻攝) and division (等)	Yun (韻)	Conditions	Examples
i	Open III 咸	鹽	幫, 泥, 精 and 日 series; velars	貶尖染厭
i	Open III 咸	嚴	Unconditional	嚴劍欠醃
i	Open IV 咸	添	端, 泥, 見 and 曉 series	店念嫌兼
i	Open III 山	仙	幫, 泥, 精, 見 and 影 series	變剪連延
i	Open III 山	元	Unconditional	建言軒堰
i	Closed III 山	仙	most terms of 泥 and 精 series and two irregular 以 initial terms	戀泉宣沿
e	Open I 咸	覃	Sporadic	耽堪坎勘
e	Open I 咸	談	(Historical) dentialveolars	膽淡籃三
e	Open II 咸	咸	Unconditional	站攙減陷
e	Open II 咸	銜	Unconditional	攙衫監艦
e	Closed III 咸	凡	Unconditional	凡泛帆範
e	Open I 山	寒	(Historical) dentialveolars	丹坦懶傘
e	Open II 山	山	Unconditional	扮產揀限
e	Open II 山	刪	Unconditional	班棧姦晏
e	Closed I 山	桓	Sporadic labials	慢蔓般瘢
e	Closed III 山	元	非 series	反翻飯萬
ue	Closed I 山	桓	two irregular terms	慣款
ue	Closed II 山	山 & 刪	Velars	關慣環幻
ue	Closed III 山	元	one irregular term	挽
oe	Open I 咸	覃	Velars	甘敢蚶酣
oe	Open III 咸	鹽	(Historical) retroflex	占陝閃禪
oe	Open I 山	寒	Velars	看乾汗安
oe	Open III 山	仙	知, 章 and 日 series	展戰善然
oe	Closed I 山	桓	幫 series and (historical) dentialveolars	搬短暖酸
oe	Closed II 山	刪	莊 series	篡閂栓
oe	Closed III 山	仙	知 and 章 series	轉傳磚船
uoe	Closed I 山	桓	Velars	官寬歡碗
uoe	Closed II & III 山	刪 & 元	Sporadic	婉宛
ioe	Closed III 山	仙	Velars and 日 initial	軟卷拳院
ioe	Closed III 山	元	Velars	勸願怨遠
ioe	Closed IV 山	先	Velars	犬縣玄淵

	Qieyun description	Yixing	Kunshan	Jiaxing	Wuhang	Zhoushan
山	Open Grade II 山	sa^{1}	sae^{1}	sae^{1}	sae^{1}	sae^{1}
凡	Closed Grade III 咸	va^{2}	vae^{2}	vae^{2}	vae^{2}	vae^{2}
鹽	Open Grade III 咸	ye^{2}	ie^{2}	ye^{2}	ye^{2}	ghien^{2}
天	Open Grade IV 山	tie^{1}	thie^{1}	thie^{1}	thie^{1}	thien^{1}
川	Closed Grade III 山	chioe^{1}	tshoe^{1}	tshoe^{1}	tshae^{1}	tshoen^{1}
南	Open Grade I 咸	ne^{2}	noe^{2}	noe^{2}	nae^{2}	nei^{2}

==== Frication ====
Several Northern Wu varieties have a very large number of contrastive high vowels. This contrast is typically realised in the form of rounding or frication. This frication can be notated as a lowering or raising of the vowel or as a glide insertion. Typically, frication in non-apical vowels happens to contrast terms with historical nasal codas.

Frication contrast in some high front vowels
Syllable	Suzhou		Changzhou	
Syllable	Wugniu	IPA	Wugniu	IPA
天	thie^{1}	/tʰi⁴⁴/	thie^{1}	/tʰiɪ⁵⁵/
梯	thi^{1}	/tʰiⱼ⁴⁴/	thi^{1}	/tʰi⁵⁵/
鳩	cieu^{1}	/tɕy⁴⁴/	ciou^{1}	/tɕiɤɯ⁵⁵/
居	ciu^{1}	/tɕyⱼ⁴⁴/	ciu^{1}	/tɕy⁵⁵/
絲	sy^{1}	/sɿ⁴⁴/	sy^{1}	/sɿ⁵⁵/
書	syu^{1}	/sʮ⁴⁴/	syu^{1}	/sʮ⁵⁵/

=== Codas ===
Codas in Northern Wu are relatively simple compared to other Sinitic languages. In most modern Northern Wu varieties, only a single nasal phoneme and a checked coda (typically transcribed /ʔ/) are permitted in coda position.

==== Nasal coda ====
Northern Wu languages typically only have one final nasal phoneme. This is typically realised as [n], [ŋ], [ȵ] or a nasalization of the nucleus vowel, typically in free variation.

==== Checked coda ====
Aside from nasals, Northern Wu languages typically only permit /ʔ/ in coda position, though some modern varieties and historical texts still preserve /k/. This is different to other coastal Southern Chinese languages, as they typically do not merge all checked codas into one category. It is also noteworthy that the coda is often realised as a shortening of the vowel rather than an actual [ʔ], which contrasts with Oujiang varieties, which typically lengthen checked syllables. Compare the following syllables.

Checked-coda terms in various languages
	Historical coda	Edkins (1868)	Shanghai	Haining (Xiashi)	Shangyu	Yinzhou	Wenzhou	Hong Kong	Xi'an	Tokyo (Go'on)
立	-p	lih	liq^{8} /liɪʔ˩˨/	liq^{8} /liəʔ˨/	liq^{7} /liɪʔ˥/	liq^{8} /liʔ˩˨/	lei^{8}, li^{8} /lei˨˩˧/,/li˨˩˧/	laap^{6} /laːp˨/	lǐ /li˧˩/	ryuu /ɾjɯː/
法	-p	fah	faq^{7} /faʔ˦/	faq^{7} /faʔ˥/	faq^{7} /fɐʔ˥/	faq^{7} /faʔ/	ho^{7} /ho˨˩˧/	faat^{3} /faːt˧/	fǎ /fa˧˩/	hou /hoː/
鐵	-t	t’ih	thiq^{7} /tʰiɪʔ˦/	thiq^{7} /tʰiəʔ˥/	thiq^{7} /tʰiɪʔ˥/	thiq^{7} /tʰiʔ˥/	thi^{7} /tʰi˨˩˧/	tit^{3} /tʰiːt˧/	tiě /tʰiɛ˧˩/	teti /tetɕi/
七	-t	t’sih	chiq^{7} /tɕiɪʔ˦/	chiq^{7} /tɕiəʔ˥/	chiq^{7} /tɕiɪʔ˥/	chiq^{7} /tɕiɪʔ˥/	tshai^{7} /tsʰai˨˩˧/	cat^{1} /tsʰɐt˥/	qǐ /tɕi˧˩/	siti /ɕitɕi/
角	-k	kók	koq^{7} /koʔ˦/	koq^{7} /koʔ˥/	koq^{7} /koʔ˥/	koq^{7} /koʔ˥/	ko^{7} /ko˨˩˧/	gok^{3} /kɔːk˧/	juǒ /tɕyɤ˧˩/	kaku /kakɯ/
落	-k	lok	loq^{8} /loʔ˩˨/	loq^{8} /loʔ˨/	loq^{8} /loʔ˧/	loq^{8} /loʔ˩˨/	lo^{8} /lo˨˩˧/	lok^{6} /lɔːk˨/	luǒ /luɤ˧˩/	raku /ɾakɯ/

== Tones ==
Tone plays a critical role in Northern Wu and impacts the realisation of both initials and finals. It disambiguates between both monosyllabic words via underlying tone and polysyllabic terms through the use of tone sandhi. Northern Wu languages can theoretically have up to twelve phonemic tones, depending on analysis. These lects can be found in places in Suzhou and Jiaxing, such as Wujiang.

=== Phonemic tone ===
Phonemic tones in Northern Wu is traditionally analysed based on four historical tone categories, which are further divided in half based on the voicing of the initial. Those that pair with voiceless initials are known as "dark" (陰) tones and the opposite is true for "light" (陽) ones. This yields a total of eight tones. The hypothetical maximum of 12 tones are achieved when aspiration conditions a further tone split through the dark tones.

Tone contours of monosyllables in three lects in Wujiang
Historical Category	Phonation	Example words	Category	Wugniu	Songling	Tongli	Pingwang
Level	Plain	剛丁三安	Whole dark level 全陰平	1	55	55	55
Level	Aspirate	開粗天偏	Partial dark level 次陰平	1	33	33	33
Level	Voiced	陳唐寒人	Light level 陽平	2	13	13	24
Rising	Plain	古短比好	Whole dark rising 全陰上	3	51	51	51
Rising	Aspirate	口草體普	Partial dark rising 次陰上	3	42	42	34
Rising	Voiced	近厚老染	Light rising 陽上	4	31	31	23
Departing	Plain	蓋對漢送	Whole dark rising 全陰去	5	412	412	513
Departing	Aspirate	臭菜退戲	Partial dark rising 次陰去	5	312	312	313
Departing	Voiced	樹共飯帽	Light rising 陽去	6	212	212	213
Checked	Plain	各百說發	Whole dark rising 全陰入	7	5	5	5
Checked	Aspirate	尺切拍曲	Partial dark rising 次陰入	7	3	3	3
Checked	Voiced	局服岳六	Light rising 陽入	8	2	2	2

Note that, unlike Yue languages, the dark checked tone split is conditioned by aspiration, not vowel length.

Although there are Northern Wu lects with a high number of tones, it is also noteworthy that contemporary Shanghainese in particular only has at most five phonemic tones, by merging tones 2 and 4 with 6, and tones 3 with 5. A typical Northern Wu variety has 7–8 tones.

Tone categories in Shanghainese
	Level	Rising	Departing	Checked
Voiceless	1	5		7
Voiced	6			8

For the most part, light tones can only occur with voiced initials, and dark tones can only occur with voiceless initials. In general, the light counterpart of a dark tone tends to be a lowered (or depressed) equivalent of the dark tone, as explored above. Compare the pronunciations of the dark and light departing tones in the following Wu varieties:

	Tone 5	Tone 6
Jiangyin	423	213
Suzhou	513	31
Pinghu	445	13
Haiyan	35	213
Xiaoshan	53	31
Ningbo	44	213
Shanghai	334	113

=== Neutral tones ===
Neutral tones (Chinese: 輕聲), informally transcribed as 0 or not transcribed at all, are found in tone sandhi and in some grammatical particles. For instance, the perfective particle 了, leq in Shanghainese should be tone 8 due to its voiced and checked nature, though it in reality functions without a tone. This phenomenon can also be observed in Standard Mandarin, though it is more pronounced in Northern Wu due to the grammatical nature of Northern Wu sandhi.

=== Tone sandhi ===
Northern Wu languages all have tone sandhi, both left-prominent (hereafter LPS) and often right-prominent (RPS). (Note: LPS is also known as "broad sandhi" (廣用式) and RPS is also known as "narrow sandhi" (窄用式).) LPS is typically found in polysyllabic words, whereas RPS is typically found in verb-object constructions. This is a feature that is shared among Wu languages, though in Northern Wu, sandhi chains generally share similar contours. This, coupled with the fact that this sort of complex tone sandhi cannot be found in the Qieyun system or reconstructions of Middle Chinese, would suggest that this sandhi is a Wu shared innovation, and that Northern Wu languages share a recent common origin.

There are five general types of contours:

- Contour spreading, where the contour of the head syllable gets stretched over subsequent syllables
- Default realization, where the subsequent syllables become null tones
- Contour leveling, where a syllable removes its tone contour movement such that it becomes level
- Citation target, where a tone on a syllable in a sandhi chain varies compared to its monosyllabic/citation form because it is affected by other conditioning factors such as stress. For example, stress can cause an apparent tone contour to start and end higher compared to its underlying form. Stress can also neutralize the dipping portion of such a bidirectional tone, becoming a simple rising contour (if the underlying tone is low-dip-high ˨˩˦).
- Categorical shift, where the subsequent syllables change tone categories

==== Left-prominent sandhi ====
LPS in Northern Wu is typically regarded as highly complex. Northern Wu varieties are traditionally analysed to have unique sandhi chains for each tone category of every syllable, which results in complex charts that sprawl several pages. However, these analyses can usually be simplified, and not all combinations yield unique sandhi chains. Shanghainese LPS, for instance, has traditionally been analysed to only preserve phonemic tone on the first or head syllable, and drop it on all subsequent syllables, which may thus be considered somewhat similar to pitch accent in some languages. However, some younger speakers insert a rising tone contour on traditionally voiced initials to perhaps mimic the depression effect.

This is similar to some analyses of Suzhounese and Hangzhounese. Checked tones in Suzhounese can be analysed to preserve the underlying tone of the first two syllables, (Note: This is the system used on Wiktionary.) whereas Hangzhounese sandhi is conditioned based on whether the second syllable belongs to the rising or non-rising category.

Suzhounese checked tone sandhi
Tone number		Disyllabic	Trisyllabic	Quadrisyllabic
First syllable	Second syllable	Disyllabic	Trisyllabic	Quadrisyllabic
7	1, 2	44 23	44 23 0	44 23 44 0
7	3	55 51	55 51 0	55 51 1 0
7	5, 6	55 523	55 52 33	55 52 22 33
7	7, 8	44 44	44 44 0	44 44 22 0
8	1, 2	22 33	22 33 0	22 33 44 0
8	3	22 51	22 51 0	22 51 11 0
8	5, 6	22 523	22 52 33	22 52 22 33
8	7, 8	33 44	33 44 0	33 44 22 0

The tone category of the third and fourth syllables do not matter.

==== Right-prominent sandhi ====
RPS primarily occurs on verbs in verb-object constructions, and often is only relevant to monosyllables. They also occur in certain situations such as quantitative adjectives and a handful of irregular words. This can be used to disambiguate between certain constructions, such as the famous 炒麪 example, but also the following:

LPS and RPS minimal pairs in Chongmingese
LPS	九桶 /tɕiɵ⁴² dõ³³/	半天 /pie³³ tʰie⁵⁵/
RPS	酒桶 /tɕiɵ³³ dõ/	變天 /pie⁴² tʰie⁵⁵/
