= Kunshan dialect =

Wu Chinese variety spoken in Kunshan

Kunshanese
- 崑山閒話 / 昆山闲话 khuen-sae ghae-gho
- Pronunciation: [kʰuən˥ sɛ˥˨ ɦɛ˩˧ ɦo˨˩]
- Native to: China
- Region: Kunshan county
- Ethnicity: Wu Chinese-speaking people
- Language family: Sino-Tibetan: Sinitic; Chinese; Wu; Taihu/Northern; Su–Hu–Jia; Kunshanese
- Writing system: Chinese characters

Language codes
- ISO 639-3: –
- ISO 639-6: suji
- Linguasphere: > 79-AAA-dbb >

The Kunshan dialect, or Kunshanese, is the Chinese variety traditionally spoken in the county of Kunshan, Suzhou prefecture. It is classified as a Northern Wu variety closely related to nearby Suzhounese and Shanghainese. Like other Northern Wu varieties, it has a large phonemic vowel inventory and voiced initials as described in the Qieyun System.

As a Northern Wu variety, Kunshanese is mutually intelligible with other Northern Wu varieties, as well as Taizhounese, but not with more distantly related lects such as Cantonese, Standard Mandarin, or even Wenzhounese, another Wu Chinese variety. Note that Kunshan Opera is not performed in Kunshanese, unlike that of nearby Shaoxing; Zhongzhouyun, a Mandarinic rime system, is used instead.

== Phonology ==
=== Initials ===
Initial consonants
| | | Labial | Dental/Alveolar | Alveolo-palatal | Velar | Glottal |
|---|---|---|---|---|---|---|
| Nasal | | m | n | ȵ | ŋ | |
| Plosive | tenuis | p | t | | k | ʔ |
| Plosive | aspirated | pʰ | tʰ | | kʰ | |
| Plosive | voiced | b | d | | ɡ | |
| Affricate | tenuis | | ts | tɕ | | |
| Affricate | aspirated | | tsʰ | tɕʰ | | |
| Affricate | voiced | | | dʑ | | |
| Fricative | voiceless | f | s | ɕ | | h |
| Fricative | voiced | v | z | | | ɦ |
| Lateral | | | l | | | |

The /ɦ/ and null initials are often realised similarly, especially in flowing speech. /h/ is at times written as /x/.

Voiced initials only appear with light tone categories, whereas voiceless ones only appear with dark tones.

=== Finals ===
Finals
| Medial | Nucleus | | | | | | | | | | | | | |
| Medial | ∅ | a | ɔ | o | ɛ | ei | ø | ã | ən | oŋ | aʔ | oʔ | əʔ | syllabic consonant |
|---|---|---|---|---|---|---|---|---|---|---|---|---|---|---|
| ∅ | ɿ, ʮ | a | ɔ | o | ɛ | ei | ø | ã | ən | oŋ | aʔ | oʔ | əʔ | əl |
| i | i | ia | iɔ | | ɪ | | | iã | in | ioŋ | iaʔ | | iɪʔ | m |
| u | u, əu | ua | | | uɛ | uei | uø | uã | uən | | uaʔ | | uoʔ | n |
| y | y | | | | | | yø | | yn | | | yoʔ | yəʔ | |

Narrower features are as follows:

- /i/ is often fricated, like in Suzhounese. In other words, there is a sibilance-like "hissing" quality when /i/ is pronounced.
- /u/ is slightly fronted and may also be labialised into [f̩] or [v̩] depending on the initial.
- /o/ is often very raised ([o̝]).
- /ɛ/ is often centralised to [e̞].
- /ø/ nuclei are at times slightly backed and approach [ɤ].
- A nasal coda may be heard after an /ã/ nucleus.
- /iɪʔ/ may be realised as [iəʔ] when following alveolo-palatal, velar, or glottal initials.

=== Tones ===
Kunshanese has seven citation tones and a complex tone sandhi system.

Tone chart
| Wugniu Tone | Tone name | Tone letters |
|---|---|---|
| 1 | dark level (陰平) | ˥ (55) |
| 2 | light level (陽平) | ˩˧ (13) |
| 3 | rising (陰上) | ˥˨ (52) |
| 5 | dark departing (陰去) | ˦˩˨ (412) |
| 6 | light departing (陽去) | ˨˩˧ (213) |
| 7 | dark checked (陰入) | ˥ʔ (5) |
| 8 | light checked (陽入) | ˨˧ʔ (23) |
