= Jiangyin dialect =

Dialect of the Northern Wu Chinese language

The Jiangyin dialect (Chinese: 江阴话; pinyin: Jiāngyīnhuà) is a Northern Wu Chinese dialect spoken in the city of Jiangyin in Jiangsu province. The Jiangyin dialect is a member of the Wu Chinese Taihu Wu family of dialects, which means the inhabitants speak a dialect similar to that of nearby Wuxi, Changzhou, Suzhou, and Shanghai. The Jiangyin dialect itself is of the Piling variety, related to the Changzhou dialect. The Jiangyin dialect has the highest degree of mutual intelligibility with the dialects of the closest neighboring cities of Changzhou and Wuxi but also has a fairly large degree of mutual intelligibility with the dialects of nearby Suzhou and Shanghai. As one travels south towards Wuxi away from the urban center of Jiangyin, the Jiangyin dialect increasingly sounds closer to the Wuxi dialect.

A book called A collection of Jiangyin dialect has been published.
