= Ningbonese =

Ningbonese ("of or related to Ningbo") may refer to:

- Ningbonese dialect of Chinese
