= Changzhou dialect =

Wu dialect of Changzhou, China

- Piling
- 常州话 zaon-tsei-gho
- Pronunciation: [z̥ɑŋ.tsei.ɦo]
- Native to: People's Republic of China
- Region: Changzhou, Jiangsu Province; Shanghai; Overseas, in the United States (New York City)
- Language family: Sino-Tibetan: Sinitic; Chinese; Wu; Taihu; Piling; Changzhou dialect

Language codes
- ISO 639-3: –
- ISO 639-6: plig
- Glottolog: pili1238 Piling
- Linguasphere: 79-AAA-dba

Changzhounese (simplified Chinese: 常州话; traditional Chinese: 常州話; IPA: [z̥ɑŋ.tsei.ɦu] (pronunciation in Changzhounese)) is a variety of Wu Chinese, a Sino-Tibetan language family. It is spoken in and around the prefectural centre of Changzhou, Jiangsu. Being a Northern Wu variety, it shares many similarities with the Shanghainese and Suzhounese. It is not at all mutually intelligible with Mandarin, China's official language. It is much more closely related to the neighboring variety in Wuxi with which it is mostly mutually intelligible.

Phonetically, Changzhounese makes use of a number of voiced (or slack voiced) initials, namely [b̥ d̥ ɡ̊ d̥z̥ d̥ʑ̊ v̥ z̥ ɦ̥], that are not found in Mandarin as well as a larger number of vowel sounds, namely [ɑ ɐ ɔ o æ ə ɨ ɨʷ ɛ ɤɯ e i u y]. The tone system also is of greater complexity, using 7 tones based on traditional analyses. It also has a more complex tone sandhi than that of most other Chinese varieties.

Changzhounese is the representative variety of Piling Wu (Chinese: 毗陵片), a dialect cluster situated near the border with Huai Chinese. Yuan Ren Chao was the first person who used modern linguistic methods to study Changzhounese, and especially made a pioneering and outstanding contribution to the research on Changzhounese phonetics. In around the early 20th century, two linguistically very similar but nonetheless distinct varieties, "gentlemans' talk" and "street talk", appeared in Changzhou city.

== Geographic distribution ==
Changzhounese is centered around the city of Changzhou and is spoken throughout the prefecture. It is notable as being one of the last places one hears Wu when traveling west from the mouth of the Yangtze before it gives way to the Southern Mandarin dialects in Zhenjiang and Nanjing prefectures.

Within the prefecture, there are also small but noticeable distinctions in pronunciation between the city center and the more rural surroundings which can be easily detected by native speakers. It is likely that as most residents have remained in the same village for many generations and have been locally educated these variations have managed to persist.

As one travels closer to Wuxi, the dialect begins to be closer to that spoken in neighboring Wuxi, the dialect of Wu that is most closely related to the Changzhou dialect. Speakers from the eastern Changzhou villages have little difficulty conversing fluently with those from the western end of Wuxi Prefecture.

In addition to the surrounding areas of Jiangsu Province, the Changzhou dialect is also emerging as a spoken dialect in Shanghai, and overseas in New York City in the United States.

== Development ==
=== Influence of Lin'an Mandarin on Wu Dialect ===
The Lin'an Mandarin (Hangzhou Mandarin) has had an important influence on the Wu dialect area. The Nandu of the Song dynasty had an important influence on the dialects of Zhejiang, especially along the Qiantang River and its upper reaches. In these areas, there is still a reading system called "Zhejiang Mandarin" by the locals, which has played a role in the regional common language. The Song dynasty moved south to Hangzhou, and the northern mandarin entered the Wu dialect area and formed a new level; Changzhou, Suzhou, Shanghai and other places changed the voicing of the Wu dialect due to the influence of the Lin'an Mandarin.

=== Investigation and Recognization Changzhou dialect phonology ===
Mr. Zhao Yuanren is the first person to conduct in-depth and detailed investigations on the phonetics of Changzhou dialect and sort out the phonetic system of Changzhou dialect, because it was born with the birth of "The Study of Modern Wu Dialect". Mr. Zhao described the Changzhou dialect system three times. For the first time, in October 1927, Mr. Zhao Yuanren organized a survey of Wu dialects, and his hometown Changzhou dialect was included in 33 survey points. Published "Seventeen Examples of Musical Tones in Changzhou Poetry", the beginning of which listed the tones, initials and finals of Changzhou dialect; the third time, in January 1968, at the appointment of the American Oriental Society, he wrote the article "Changzhou Dialect", published in 1970, English version. It had three publications, although the time span is large, the focus is different, and the presentation methods are also different, the research conclusions are very uniform in nature, because the speaker is Mr. Zhao himself for the second time, and the object of the first pronunciation is a 35-year-old teacher, the same age as Mr. Zhao. Mr. Zhao has lived abroad for a long time, so his Changzhou dialect has not "advanced with the times", and always maintains the original style. Zhao's Changzhou dialect has 7 single-character tones, 30 initials and 45 finals.

=== Gently Talk and Street Talk ===
The words of "gently talk" and "street talk" in Changzhou dialect can be found in the dialect survey and records of Changzhou dialect made by international language master Mr. Zhao Yuanren in the early 20th century.

The distinction between "gentle talk" and "street talk" appeared earlier. It is not clear when the differentiation began, because the earliest relevant record seen so far is Mr. Zhao's "Research on Modern Wu Dialects". Presumably, this distinction already existed in the Qing dynasty - Mr. Zhao was talking about gentry since he was a child.

"Gently talk" and "street talk" use different groups of people. Gentry is also called squire's dialect, squire's talk, etc. As the name suggests, it was the words spoken by the gentlemen in the countryside at that time. In the late period of Chinese feudal society, especially in the Qing dynasty, Changzhou enjoyed the reputation of "the important support of Wujin and the famous capital of Bayi", with convenient commerce and trade, leading economy, prosperous humanities, and prosperous academics. When people arrived in Changzhou, they became a wealthy family in Changzhou and an urban upstart with a rural accent. When Mr. Zhao Yuanren's great-grandfather moved his family to Qingguo Lane, his descendants settled here. Qingguo Lane is another place where officials and gentry gather in Changzhou. The squires who live in these places all say something called "gentle talk". The source of gentry talk is probably the crepe crepe passed down from generation to generation by the families of officials and giants. The urbanized country tone later gradually became a symbol of distinguishing identity. The street talk is the authentic Changzhou accent, the accent of the local ordinary citizens, and the accent of most people in the city.

The main difference between gentle talk and street talk is the tone of voice. The difference between gentle talk and street talk is concentrated on one point - the difference in monograms. There are 7 tones in Changzhou dialect. According to Mr. Zhao Yuanren’s investigation and description, the differences in the tones of Changzhou dialects between gentry and street talk are as follows: First, the yin rise value is different. The gentry yin rise value is 55; The upward adjustment value is 35, the difference is subtle but sensitive; second, the second voice is the upper voice, the street talk should be the (yin) upper voice of 35, the gentleman's talk is the text reading (yin) of the upper voice of 55, and the vernacular should be the yangping of 73.

== Phonetics and phonology ==
=== Initials ===
		Labial	Dental	Alveolar	Palatal	Velar	Glottal
Nasal		m	n		ɲ	ŋ	
Plosive/ Affricate	voiceless	p	t	ts	tɕ	k	ʔ
Plosive/ Affricate	aspirated	pʰ	tʰ	tsʰ	tɕʰ	kʰ	
Plosive/ Affricate	slack voice	b̥	d̥	d̥z̥	d̥ʑ̊	ɡ̊	
Fricative	voiceless	f		s	ɕ		h
Fricative	slack voice	v̥		z̥			ɦ̥
Lateral			l		ʎ	ʟ	

=== Finals ===
Medial	Nucleus													
Medial	∅	ʌ	ɔ	ɛ	æe	ei	ɯu	ɤɯ	∅̃	õ	ʌŋ	i/ɛŋ	oŋ	ɚ
∅	ɨ	ʌ	ɔ	ɛ	æe	ei	ɯu	ɤɯ	æ̃	õ	ʌŋ	ɛŋ	oŋ	ɚ
i	i	iʌ	iɔ	iɛ			iɯu	iɤɯ	ĩ	iõ	iʌŋ	iŋ	ioŋ	
u	u	uʌ	uɔ	uɛ	uæe				uæ̃	uõ	uʌŋ	uɛŋ		
y	y			yɛ								yiŋ		

Note2:

- The original tables

=== Tones ===
Like a number of other Wu dialects, the Changzhou dialect is considered to have seven tones. However, since the tone split dating from Middle Chinese still depends on the voicing of the initial consonant, these constitute just three phonemic tones. The seven tonic allophones were divided according to register by the Chinese-American linguist and Changzhou native Yuen Ren Chao. The high register includes the first, third, fourth and sixth tone with the second, fifth and seventh tone in the low register.

Tone chart of the Changzhou dialect
Number	Tone name	Tone contour	Notes
1	陰平 yīn píng	˦ (44)	mid-high
2	陽平 yáng píng	˩˧ (13)	rising
3	上 shàng	˥ (55)	high
4	陰去 yīn qù	˥˨˧ (523)	dipping
5	陽去 yáng qù	˨˦ (24)	mid-rising
6	陰入 yīn rù	˥ʔ (5)	high entering
7	陽入 yáng rù	˨˧ʔ (23)	rising entering, shorter than most other tones

==== Tone sandhi ====
Sandhi in Wu dialects is complex compared to Mandarin, though Changzhou sandhi is not nearly as complex as that of the Suzhou dialect of Wu.

In the case of pairs of syllables have the stress on the second syllable, the only notable changes are the second syllable changing from [ ˥˨˧ ] (523) to [ ˥˨ ] (52) in the case of the fourth tone, or from [ ˩˧ ] (13) to [ ˩ ] (11) with the second tone.

Tone sandhi for the Changzhou dialect
	1st	3rd	4th	6th	2nd	5th	7th
first	[ ˧.˧ ]	[ ˥.˧˨ ]	[ ˥.˧˨ ]	[ ˥.˧ ]	[ ˧.˧ ]	[ ˥.˧˨ ]	[ ˥.˧ ]
third	[ ˥˧.˨ ]	[ ˥˧.˨ ]	[ ˥˧.˨ ]	[ ˥˧.˨ ]	[ ˥˧.˨ ]	[ ˥˧.˨ ]	[ ˥˧.˨ ]
fourth	[ ˥.˥ ]	[ ˥˧.˨ ]	[ ˥.˥ ]	[ ˥.˥ ]	[ ˥.˥ ]	[ ˥.˥ ]	[ ˥.˥ ]
sixth	[ ˥.˥ ]	[ ˥.˥ ]	[ ˥.˦˨ ]	[ ˥.˥ ]	[ ˥.˥ ]	[ ˥.˦˨ ]	[ ˥.˥ ]
second	[ ˩.˧ ]	[ ˩.˥ ]	[ ˩.˧ ]	[ ˩.˥ ]	[ ˩.˧ ]	[ ˩.˧ ]	[ ˩.˧ ]
fifth	[ ˧˨.˨˧ ]	[ ˧˨.˨˧ ]	[ ˧˥.˧˨ ]	[ ˧˨.˨˧ ]	[ ˧˨.˩˧ ]	[ ˧˥.˧˨ ]	[ ˧˨.˨˧ ]
seventh	[ ˨˧.˧ ]	[ ˨˧.˧ ]	[ ˨˧.˦˨ ]	[ ˨˧.˧ ]	[ ˨˧.˧ ]	[ ˨˧.˧˨ ]	[ ˨˧.˧ ]

== Examples ==
Translation	IPA	Chinese character
Changzhou	[zɑŋ.tsei]	常州
Changzhou dialect	[zɑŋ.tsei.ɦɔ]	常州话
I	[ŋʌɯ]	我
You	[ɲi]	你
Have you eaten?	[tɕʰiʔ.væ̃.vɛn]	喫飯朆(吃饭没)

=== Four-Character Idioms ===
The common idioms in Changzhou dialect are: phrases with fixed structure and overall semantics, which are passed down orally by the people of Changzhou and used in the Changzhou dialect area. The idioms in the dialect have a strong dialect color. Only those who have lived in a certain dialect area for a long time can use it freely, like a fish in water; otherwise, they do not understand its meaning, or seem to understand it.

挨肩擦背(Shoulder to Shoulder): crowded

壁跟壁落(Walls and Walls): every corner

别咧卜落(Don't be fooled): one after another, non-stop

七搭八搭(Compatible with each other): describe the speech as being out of focus

测测默默(Quietly): silently

搭七搭八(Take seven and eight): casually strike up a conversation with people, and the relationship is ambiguous

搭头搭脑(Head-to-head and head-to-head): total before and after

得溜滚圆(Gotta be round): very round

滴沥笃落(Drip drop): the sound of light rain, also refers to the flow of water is not smooth

暗忽隆冬(Darkness and Midwinter): Dark, not bright ......

== Influence ==
The influence of Changzhou dialect on Changzhou mandarin is mainly concentrated in the following two aspects. First, both Yangping and Qusheng in Mandarin tend to be yin people's voices. The end point or starting point of the tone change of Mandarin Yangping (tone value 35) and Qusheng (iJt value 51) is 5, while the tone value of Changzhou Yinren tone is 5. These three tones are easily confused in speech flow. Due to the influence of the dialect habits, Changzhou people are very easy to pronounce the Yinren yin in the dialect with the pronunciation of the Mandarin, so there is a phenomenon that some Mandarin yangping and Qusheng characters are pronounced as yin jinxuan, such as "that is即, but却, "shu束" are very easy to be pronounced as yin people's voices. Second, the sound of Mandarin tends to be Yangping. The tone value of Mandarin is 214, and the tone value of Changzhou dialect is 213. The two tone types are very similar. At the same time, the characters in the Yangping tone of Changzhou dialect are basically Yangping tone in Mandarin, which makes it easy for Changzhou people to compare it with Changzhou dialect. The upper tone of Mandarin, which is very similar to the Yangping tone, is related to the Yangping tone of Mandarin.

The influence of Changzhou dialect on the pronunciation of Changzhou Mandarin belongs to a special linguistic phenomenon produced by the contact and fusion of dialect and national common language.

== See also ==
- List of Chinese dialects
- Suzhou dialect
- Shanghainese
- Wu dialects
