= Shadi dialect =

Wu Chinese dialect

The Shadi dialect (Chinese: 沙地话; pinyin: Shādìhuà; Native name: 沙地話) is a Wu Chinese dialect spoken in Chongming, Haimen, and Qidong districts as well as in some areas of Zhangjiagang. It is considered to be a variety of Taihu Wu, which is intelligible with Shanghainese.
