= Taihu Wu =

Wu Chinese language

- Northern Wu
- 吳語太湖片
- Native to: People's Republic of China
- Region: Primarily in southern Jiangsu, northern Zhejiang, southeastern Anhui, and Shanghai
- Speakers: 47.26 million (2012)
- Language family: Sino-Tibetan: Sinitic; Chinese; Wu; Taihu Wu
- Writing system: Chinese characters

Language codes
- ISO 639-3: None (mis)
- ISO 639-6: taiu tupn
- Glottolog: taih1244
- Linguasphere: 79-AAA-db

Taihu Wu (吳語太湖片) or Northern Wu (北部吳語) is a Wu Chinese language spoken in much of the southern part of the province of Jiangsu, including Suzhou, Wuxi, Changzhou, the southern part of Nantong, Jingjiang and Danyang; the municipality of Shanghai; and the northern part of Zhejiang province, including Hangzhou, Shaoxing, Ningbo, Huzhou, and Jiaxing. A notable exception is the dialect of the town of Jinxiang, which is a linguistic exclave of Taihu Wu in Zhenan Min-speaking Cangnan county of Wenzhou prefecture in Zhejiang province. Speakers in regions around Taihu Lake and Hangzhou Bay, are the largest population among all Wu speakers. Taihu Wu dialects such as Shanghainese, Shaoxing Wu, and Ningbo Wu are mutually intelligible even for L2 Taihu speakers.

== History ==
Linguistic affinity has also been used as a tool for regional identity and politics in the Jiangbei and Jiangnan regions. While the city of Yangzhou was the center of trade, flourishing and prosperous, it was considered part of Jiangnan, which was known to be wealthy, even though Yangzhou was north of the Yangzi River. Once Yangzhou's wealth and prosperity were gone, it was then considered to be part of Jiangbei, the "backwater".

After Yangzhou was removed from Jiangnan, many of its residents switched from Jianghuai Mandarin, the dialect of Yangzhou, to Taihu Wu dialects. As such, in Jiangnan itself, multiple subdialects of Wu competed for the position of prestige dialect.

In 1984, around 85 million speakers are mutually intelligible with Shanghainese.

== Phonology ==
Taihu Wu varieties tend to preserve historical voiced initials. The number of phonemic vowels can reach numbers higher than that of some Germanic languages. Taihu Wu varieties typically have phonemic 7-8 tones, though some can go as high as 12 or as low as 5, and they all have highly complex tone sandhi.

== List of Taihu Wu dialects ==
- Su–Jia–Hu (Suzhou–Jiaxing–Huzhou, 蘇嘉湖小片)
  - Su–Hu–Jia (Suzhou–Shanghai–Jiaxing, 蘇滬嘉小片) – 23 million speakers in 1987
    - Suzhou dialect (Jiangsu)
    - Shanghainese (Shanghai; includes further subgroups)
    - Jiaxing dialect (Zhejiang)
    - Haining dialect (Zhejiang)
    - Kunshan dialect (Jiangsu)
    - Changshu dialect (常熟话, Jiangsu)
    - Shadi dialect (沙地话, Jiangsu and Shanghai; also known as the Qihai or Chongming dialect)
    - Wuxi dialect (Jiangsu; transitional with Piling)
  - Tiaoxi (苕溪小片) – 3 million speakers in 1987
    - Huzhou dialect (Zhejiang)
    - Deqing dialect (Zhejiang)
    - Tongxiang dialect (Zhejiang)
    - Southeast Guangde dialect (Anhui)
- Northwestern Wu
  - Piling (毗陵小片, spoken in Jiangsu and Anhui provinces, transitional with Jianghuai Mandarin) – 8 million speakers in 1987
    - Changzhou dialect (Jiangsu)
    - Jiangyin dialect (Jiangsu)
    - Danyang dialect (Jiangsu)
  - Hangzhou (杭州小片) – 1.2 million speakers in 1987
    - Hangzhou dialect (Zhejiang)
- Northern Zhejiang
  - Lin–Shao (臨紹小片) – 7.8 million speakers in 1987
    - Shaoxing dialect (Zhejiang)
    - Lin'an dialect (Zhejiang)
  - Yongjiang (甬江小片) or Mingzhou (明州小片) – 4 million speakers in 1987
    - Ningbo dialect (Zhejiang)
    - Zhoushan dialect (Zhejiang)
  - Jinxiang dialect (金鄉話, Zhejiang)
