= Hangzhou dialect =

Sinitic language spoken in urban Hangzhou, China

Hangzhounese
- Hangzhou dialect
- 杭州話／杭州话, ghan-tsei-wa
- Pronunciation: [ɦɑŋ˨ tsei˧˦ ɦua˥˧]
- Native to: People's Republic of China
- Region: urban centre of Hangzhou
- Speakers: 1.92 million (2012)
- Language family: Sino-Tibetan: Sinitic; Chinese; Wu/Mandarin; Northern Wu/Southern Mandarin; Hangzhounese

Language codes
- ISO 639-3: –
- ISO 639-6: hgou
- Glottolog: hang1257
- Linguasphere: 79-AAA-dbd
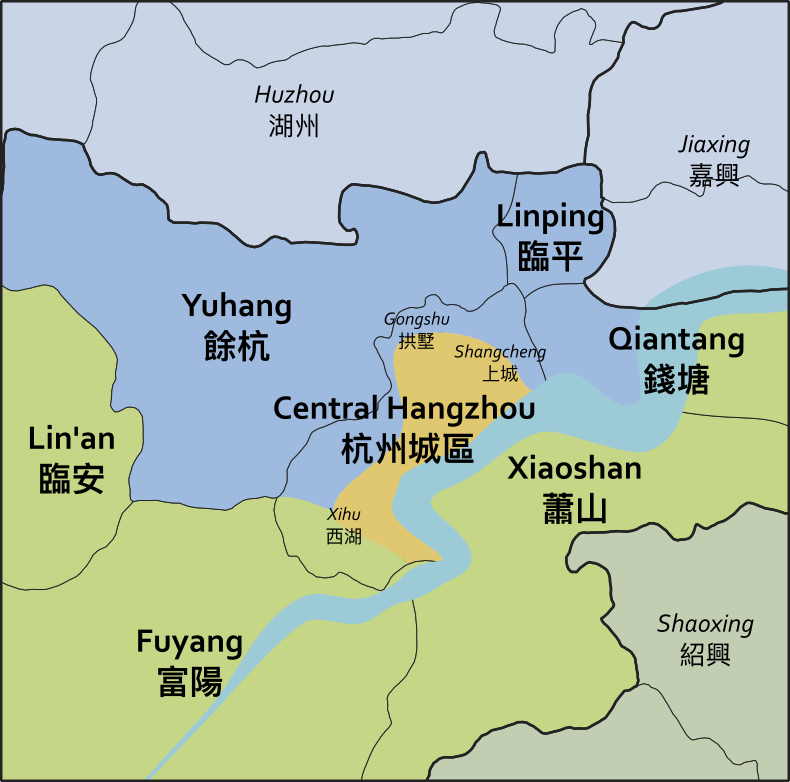
- Location where Hangzhounese is traditionally spoken, between Suhujia (blue) and Linshao (green) areas

Hangzhounese, or the Hangzhou dialect, is a Sinitic language spoken in the urban centre of Hangzhou (that is to say, in the districts of Gongshu, Shangcheng, Xihu, Binjiang, and parts of Qiantang), the capital of Zhejiang, China, by over a million speakers. It has traditionally been classified as a Northern Wu variety, but has undergone significant Mandarinic influence, due in large part to historical migrations, making it of immense interest to Chinese historical phonologists and dialectologists. Phonologically, the variety has many features that distinguish it from traditional Wu varieties such as Suzhounese and Shanghainese, but also exhibits behaviour not seen in other Mandarinic languages. Hangzhounese is also lexically and morphosyntactically difficult to categorise, leading to some linguists calling it a "Mandarinicised Wu" hybrid variety, or even a creole language. Today, Hangzhounese remains an important cultural marker for natives of the city, though its cultural significance is not as strong as that of Shanghainese to Shanghai inhabitants. Its usage has also declined due to the dominance of Standard Mandarin in education and public life.

== Distribution ==
Hangzhounese is mainly spoken in the urban area in Hangzhou, including the urban area of modern-day Gongshu, Shangcheng, the urban core and seven villages of Xihu, and parts of Binjiang. The first edition of the Language Atlas of China further restricts this to only the north bank of the Qiantang River, whereas the second edition expands its userbase into Yuhang and Xiaoshan as well.

== Classification ==
If Hangzhounese is to be classified as a Wu variety, it is the sole member of the Hangzhou cluster (杭州小片) of Northern Wu. However, an alternative phylogeny, classifying it as a parallel branch with Huai Chinese, has been proposed.

Hangzhounese, as mentioned above, has a host of features that are of Mandarinic origin. This is primarily due to the Jingkang incident and the large migration wave that accompanied it.

Phonological features include:

- Non-nasal initial in historical ri (日, typically gn- in Wu) and wei (微, typically m- in Wu) initials
- Distribution of the historical light rising tone category, a phenomenon called "濁上歸去"
- The palatalisation of velar initials in QYS second division (Chinese: 見二等)
- Merger of Common Dialectal Chinese (CDC) *-ang as in 冷 ^{3}len into *-eng as in 等 ^{3}ten (compare Suzhounese ^{6}lan and ^{3}ten)
- Merger of CDC *-uon as in 官 ^{1}kuon into *-uan as in 關 ^{1}kuon (compare Shanghainese ^{1}kuoe and ^{1}kue)
- Presence of a low -a vowel in CDC *-a as in 馬 ^{3}ma where other varieties have -o (compare Ningbonese ^{6}mo)
- Lack of Wu irregular pronunciations, such as the voiced initial of 桶 ^{3}thon (compare Chuanshanese ^{4}don) and a nasal coda in 打 ^{3}ta (compare Changzhounese ^{3}tan)

Grammatical features include:

- The personal pronouns 我你他 as opposed to 我爾佢 or 我儂佢 in nearby Northern Wu varieties
- Particles such as 不 "negator", 的 "attributive"

Lexical features include:

- Some Mandarinic lexica, such as 桌子 "table", 洗 "to wash", 日子 "day", 蜈蚣 "centipede", 穿 "to wear" (cf. 枱子, 汏, 日頭, 百腳, 着)
- Lack of Wu substrate words such as 落蘇 "aubergine" and 活孫 "monkey"

It is, however, noteworthy that many of the above features can be seen in other Wu varieties.

Hangzhounese does also have some Wu-like features, such as:

- Particles such as 瞎～ "to do poorly", ～叫 "adverbialiser", 垃哈 "locative"
- The ability to drop the negator in V-neg-V (eg. 是不是) constructions
- Word order features, such as placement of the direct object before the indirect object in ditransitive verbs, placement of the object before the complement in verb-object-complement constructions (eg. 打他不過)
- Complex bidirectional tone sandhi (as will be explained below)
- Kinship terms such as 呣媽 "mum", 孃舅 "maternal uncle"
- Frequent use of the nominal suffix ～頭
- AAB adjectives such as 冰冰冷 "ice-cold" and 筆筆直 "straight as a pen"
- Use of verbal reduplication to indicate the perfective aspect and the imperative mood
- Some Wu lexica, such as 壯 "fat", 長 "tall", 摜 "to throw", 個 "demonstrative", 辰光 "time" (cf. 胖, 高, 扔, 這, 時候)

It is also of note that Hangzhounese has been gradually gaining Wu Chinese features, such as younger speakers developing new vernacular pronunciations.

Some linguists have proposed that Hangzhounese underwent creolisation or koineisation, which would explain the blend of primarily Mandarinic phonology and primarily Wu morphosyntax.

== History ==
A map of China during the Southern Song dynasty, during which Hangzhou was capital

For much of Hangzhou's history, the lect spoken in the city would have been a typical Wu variety. The linguistic transformation that led to its Mandarinic appearance is in primarily due to the Jingkang incident of the Song dynasty, in which the imperial court was moved from Bianjing (today Kaifeng) to Lin'an, modern day Hangzhou. The event caused a massive influx of Northern Chinese refugees of various walks of life, who spoke a variety of Mandarin, dubbed by Zheng Wei as Bianliang Mandarin (汴梁官話).

As Hangzhou was the primary political and commercial centre of the region, Hangzhounese also took on the role as a local merchant language and lingua franca, leading to many Wu varieties adopting Hangzhounese's Mandarin pronunciations to form a literary layer locally called "Zhejiang Mandarin" (浙江官話). The effect is most pronounced in lects that are found along trade routes into and out of Hangzhou, such as on the Qiantang River, the Grand Canal, and directly out of the Hangzhou Bay. Hangzhounese was also used extensively in Ming dynasty literature, as seen from the many Hangzhounese or otherwise Northern Wu lexica in, for instance, Water Margin.

During the Qing dynasty, Hangzhounese underwent another instance of Mandarinisation, due to the presence of Manchu bannermen in the city. After the end of dynastic rule in China, Hangzhou experienced a large population increase, almost doubling its population between 1947 and 1985. Coupled with tuipu policies, use of Hangzhounese gradually began to decline.

Hangzhounese is today a "developing" language, with a rating of 5 on the Expanded Graded Intergenerational Disruption Scale (EGIDS), meaning it is still in vigorous use, but its written form are neither sustainable, nor widespread. A study in 2016 found that only around 20% of student respondents could proficiently use the variety, which, in contrast to the 48% figure quoted for Shanghai, is low. 3.5% of respondents used Hangzhounese exclusively at home, and a further 15.5% use it alongside Standard Mandarin. A different study had respondents that believed that it is inappropriate to use Hangzhounese in official occasions. Nonetheless, use of Hangzhounese can at times still be seen in official media, such as in the TV show Old Liutou Tells the News (阿六頭說新聞), which has been running since 2004. The show has been and still is popular to this day.

== Phonology ==
A speaker of Hangzhounese

The phonology of Hangzhounese shows a mix of both Mandarinic and Northern Wu features.

=== Initials ===
Initial Consonants
		Labial	Dental/ Alveolar	Palatal	Velar	Glottal
Nasal		m ⟨m⟩ 馬亡門麥	n ⟨n⟩ 你內難納	ɲ ⟨gn⟩ 銀繞逆玉	ŋ ⟨ng⟩ 呆礙岸額	
Plosive	plain	p ⟨p⟩ 巴表變北	t ⟨t⟩ 堆店黨德		k ⟨k⟩ 古官廣骨	(ʔ) 衣咬安屋
Plosive	aspirated	pʰ ⟨ph⟩ 破怕胖撲	tʰ ⟨th⟩ 天吐痛塔		kʰ ⟨kh⟩ 枯快康客	
Plosive	voiced	b ⟨b⟩ 袍步旁白	d ⟨d⟩ 台隊定笛		ɡ ⟨g⟩ 狂跪環葵	
Affricate	plain		ts ⟨ts⟩ 災資張桌	tɕ ⟨c⟩ 街酒江腳		
Affricate	aspirated		tsʰ ⟨tsh⟩ 車草唱尺	tɕʰ ⟨ch⟩ 丘搶欠七		
Affricate	voiced		dz (dz) 茶站蟲直	dʑ ⟨j⟩ 齊轎件強		
Fricative	voiceless	f ⟨f⟩ 封肺反法	s ⟨s⟩ 沙掃送色	ɕ ⟨sh⟩ 信小向吸		h ⟨h⟩ 花海荒黑
Fricative	voiced	v ⟨v⟩ 文肥房伐	z ⟨z⟩ 如受上肉			ɦ ⟨gh⟩, ⟨y⟩, ⟨w⟩ 戶鞋黃盒
Lateral			l ⟨l⟩ 羅亂浪六			

Hangzhounese has a three-way contrast in its plosives and affricates, and also has voicing contrast in fricatives. The voiced consonants in Hangzhounese, like Northern Wu languages, are in reality, voiceless consonants with breathy voice. The labiodental initials /f v/ are closer to [ɸ β] when in front of /u/. Sonorants, when paired with dark tones, are at times transcribed with glottalisation.

=== Finals ===
The chart below shows the 48 rimes found in contemporary Hangzhounese.

Medial	Rime														
Medial	∅	a	e	ɔ	o	ø	ei	ẽ	õ	aŋ	ən	oŋ	aʔ	əʔ	oʔ
∅	ɿ ⟨y⟩ 知次市	a ⟨a⟩ 媽哈沙	e ⟨e⟩ 開台海	ɔ ⟨au⟩ 包刀好	o ⟨o⟩ 波多我	ø ⟨eu⟩ (Note: No such rime in Wugniu; -eu used for this rime in other Wu varieties) 溝口扣	ei ⟨ei⟩ 斗頭手	ẽ ⟨aen⟩ 板山安		aŋ ⟨an⟩ 方港杭	ən ⟨en⟩ 分成很	oŋ ⟨on⟩ 東送共	aʔ ⟨aq⟩ 法集踏	əʔ ⟨eq⟩ 德汁色	oʔ ⟨oq⟩ 六叔福
i	i ⟨i⟩ 西衣皮	ia ⟨ia⟩ 家鴉下	ie ⟨ie⟩ 街界鞋	iɔ ⟨iau⟩ 交小妖		iø ⟨ieu⟩ 丟酒求		iẽ ⟨ien⟩ 煙田邊		iaŋ ⟨ian⟩ 江亮想	in ⟨in⟩ 心丁引	ioŋ ⟨ion⟩ 永兄窮	iaʔ ⟨iaq⟩ 腳削藥	ieʔ ⟨iq⟩ 筆一力	ioʔ ⟨ioq⟩ 吃玉育
u	u ⟨u⟩ 烏布蘇	ua ⟨ua⟩ 瓜花畫	ue ⟨ue⟩ 拐快外		uo ⟨uo⟩ 話 (Note: Only in 話)		uei ⟨uei⟩ 位鬼灰		uõ ⟨uon⟩ 彎亂半	uaŋ ⟨uan⟩ 黃光狂	uən ⟨uen⟩ 溫滾坤		uaʔ ⟨uaq⟩ 挖颳挖		uoʔ ⟨uoq⟩ 骨闊活
ʮ	ʮ ⟨yu⟩ 朱居樹	ʮa ⟨ua⟩ 抓耍 (Note: As in 耍把戲)	ʮe ⟨ue⟩ 摔帥率				ʮei ⟨uei⟩ 車蛇水		ʮõ ⟨uon⟩ 酸船圈	ʮaŋ ⟨uan⟩ 雙窗床	ʮən ⟨uen⟩ 村准順		ʮaʔ ⟨uaq⟩ 刷	ʮəʔ ⟨ueq⟩ 卒說熱	
y	y ⟨iu⟩ 語女取								yõ ⟨iuon⟩ 圓冤院		yn ⟨iun⟩ 雲運勻			yeʔ ⟨iuq⟩ 月浴鬱	

Other rimes include /əl/ (in, for instance, 兒爾二) and syllabic nasals /m/ (as in 呣媽 "mum"), /n/ (as in □娘 "aunt"), and /ŋ/, which is seen in the speech of younger speakers, and patterns similarly to the syllabic nasal in other Northern Wu varieties (eg. in 五).

The cross-linguistically rare apical glide /-ʮ-/ appears after dentialveolars and in complementary distribution with the /-u-/ medial.

More precise descriptions of these rimes are as follows:

- The open /e/ rimes are more accurately [e̞ ~ ɛ]. Similarly, the /ẽ/ rimes are also low in quality.
- The nuclei of the rimes /ɔ/, /iɔ/, /o/, /uo/, /oŋ/, and /ioŋ/ are closing diphthongs, though the closing action is not very pronounced.
- /i/ in Hangzhounese is slightly backed.
- /u/ when coupled with light tones is realised as [ʋ̩]. It may also be difficult to distinguish this rime with /o/.
- All instances of /a/ in the above chart may vary between [a~ɐ~ä~ɑ], among other possibilities.
- The offglide of /ei/ is closer to [ɪ].
- The rimes /uõ/, /ʮõ/, and /yõ/ do not have a closing element; the /õ/ is more accurately [õ̞].
- The /aŋ/ rimes may be realised as [æ̃] in the speech of older speakers from the old town.
- /ən/ historically had a fronted nucleus, ie. /en/
- The coda /n/ of /ən/, /in/, /uən/, /ʮən/, and /yn/ alternate freely with [ŋ]
- /in/, /uən/, /ʮən/, /yn/, /ieʔ/, /ʮəʔ/, /yeʔ/, and /uei/ may have short, weak nuclei, often realised as [ə].
- The /o/ in /oʔ/ and /ioʔ/ is more accurately [ɔ].
- /əl/ represents a rhotic. Younger speakers especially may pronounce it as [ɚ].

=== Tones ===
Hangzhounese, like other Sinitic languages, have phonemic tone. Hangzhounese has seven tone categories, based on the Middle Chinese tone categories.

Monosyllable tones
Wugniu	Category	Value	Examples
1	Dark level (陰平)	˧˧˦ 334	金詩單連貓
2	Light level (陽平)	˨˧ 23	秦時台梅毛
3	Rising (上聲)	˥˧ 53	井死膽染尾
5	Dark departing (陰去)	˦˥ 45	鏡四帶二岸
6	Light departing (陽去)	˩˩˧ 113	近誓袋右令
7	Dark checked (陰入)	˥ 5	急失的搣摸
8	Light checked (陽入)	˨˧ 23	極十踏額六

Light tones only appear with voiced obstruents and nasal initials, whereas dark tones only appear with voiceless and other sonorant initials. The rising tone acts like a dark tone; historical voiced obstruents with the rising tone category are today realised with the light departing tone.

More precise descriptions of the above are as follows:

- The dark level tone (1) is realised as [˧] 33 in quick speech
- The light level tone (2) is realised as [˨˩] 21 in quick speech, and in slow speech, a bend ([˨˩˧] 213) can be heard
- The dark departing tone (5) is often longer than the other tones, and can thus be transcribed as [˦˦˥] 445. Tones 1 and 5 therefore can be difficult to distinguish in careful speech
- The two checked tones (7 and 8) are short tones that are high and low in pitch respectively. They only appear with checked syllables, that is to say, those that end with glottal stops (/ʔ/)

Like Northern Wu languages, Hangzhounese exhibits complex tone sandhi. Sandhi chains can be bidirectional, and the most important tonemes in determining the sandhi chain lies closest to the head.

Left-prominent sandhi
Head tone	Chain length				
Head tone	1	2	3	4	5
1	˧˧˦ 334	˧ 33 ˧˦ 34	˧ 33 ˧˦ 34 ˥˧ 53	˧ 33 ˧˦ 34 ˥ 55 ˨˩ 21	˧ 33 ˧˦ 34 ˥ 55 ˨ 22 ˨˩ 21
1	˧˧˦ 334	˧ 33 ˥˧ 53	˧ 33 ˥ 55 ˨˩ 21	˧ 33 ˥ 55 ˨ 22 ˨˩ 21	˧ 33 ˧˦ 34 ˥ 55 ˨ 22 ˨˩ 21
2	˨˧ 23	˨ 22 ˧˦ 34	˨ 22 ˧˦ 34 ˥˧ 53	˨ 22 ˨˧ 34 ˥ 55 ˨˩ 21	
2	˨˧ 23	˨ 22 ˥˧ 53	˨ 22 ˥ 55 ˨˩ 21	˨ 22 ˥ 55 ˨ 22 ˨˩ 21	
3	˥˧ 53	˥ 55 ˨˩ 21	˥ 55 ˨ 22 ˨˩ 21	˥ 55 ˨ 22 ˨ 22 ˨˩ 21	˥ 55 ˨ 22 ˨ 22 ˨ 22 ˨˩ 21
5	˦˥ 45	˧˦ 34 ˥˧ 53	˧˦ 34 ˥ 55 ˨˩ 21	˧˦ 34 ˥ 55 ˨ 22 ˨˩ 21	
6	˩˩˧ 113	˩ 11 ˥˧ 53	˩ 11 ˥ 55 ˨˩ 21	˩ 11 ˥ 55 ˨ 22 ˨˩ 21	˩ 11 ˥ 55 ˨ 22 ˨ 22 ˨˩ 21
7	˥ 5	˧ 3 ˧˦ 34	˧ 3 ˧˦ 34 ˥˧ 53	˧ 3 ˧˦ 34 ˥ 55 ˨˩ 21	
7	˥ 5	˧ 3 ˥˧ 53	˧ 3 ˥ 55 ˨˩ 21	˧ 3 ˥ 55 ˨ 22 ˨˩ 21	
7	˥ 5	˥ 5 ˨˩ 21	˥ 5 ˨ 22 ˨˩ 21	˥ 5 ˨ 22 ˨ 22 ˨˩ 21	
8	˨˧ 23	˨ 2 ˧˦ 34	˨ 2 ˧˦ 34 ˥˧ 53	˨ 2 ˧˦ 34 ˥ 55 ˨˩ 21	˨ 2 ˧˦ 34 ˥ 55 ˨ 22 ˨˩ 21
8	˨˧ 23	˨ 2 ˥˧ 53	˨ 2 ˥ 55 ˨˩ 21	˨ 2 ˥ 55 ˨ 22 ˨˩ 21	˨ 2 ˧˦ 34 ˥ 55 ˨ 22 ˨˩ 21

A trisyllabic sandhi chain ˨ 2 ˨ 2 ˧ 33 is also seen in a small number of words starting with light checked syllables.

The top chain of each head tone represents the dominant sandhi chain. The second shows a secondary realisation, often associated with the rising tone category, though this association is not particularly rigid.

Left-prominent chains are used in polysyllabic words, and chains spread to subsequent words as well in verb-pronoun constructions and with the noun attributive nouns modify. Sentence-final particles also attach onto chains they follow. Some historical light rising syllables may switch categories in sandhi, for instance ^{3}lau 老 in 老鴨兒 "old duck" takes the dark rising pattern, whereas in 老酒 "huangjiu" it takes the light departing pattern.

Right-prominent sandhi
Head tone	1	2	3	5	6	7	8
Value	˧ 33	˨ 22	˧ 33 ~ ˦ 44	˧ 33 ~ ˧˦ 32	˩ 11~ ˩˨ 12 ~ ˨˧ 23	˧ 3 ~ ˦ 4	˨ 2 ~ ˧ 3

Right-prominent sandhi, on the other hand, is used in verb-object constructions, verb-resultative constructions, and on monosyllabic adverbs and subjects. The right-prominent sandhi tone change only applies to the syllable directly adjacent to the head.

Sandhi behaviour in Hangzhounese is, as demonstrated, similar to sandhi behaviour in other Northern Wu languages.

=== Generational differences ===
The /n/ initial is universally palatalised in younger speakers' speech. Syllables with irregular /l/ and /n/ initials in older speakers' speech are normalised in younger speakers' idiolects.

	鳥	寧	哪	那	兩
Standard Mandarin	niǎo	níng	nǎ	nà	liǎng
Old Hangzhounese	liau^{3}	lin^{2}	la^{3}	la^{3}	nian^{6}
New Hangzhounese	gniau^{3}	gnin^{2}	na^{3}	na^{3}	lian^{6}

The /z/ initial, when in Standard Mandarin the initial is r-, is pronounced as /ɹ/ by younger speakers.

The /ø/ rime is only found in older speakers' speech, and can also be realised as [ey]. Younger speakers merge this rime with /ei/.

The /ʮ/ rime and /-ʮ-/ glide are both merged into their /u/ counterparts in younger speakers' speech. The nasal element of the /ẽ/ and /õ/ series are lost in younger speakers' speech. Coupled with the /ʮ/-/u/ merger, younger speakers therefore merge the /ʮõ/, /uõ/, and /uo/ rimes.

The /ɑŋ/ rime series is realised as [æ̃] in the speech of older speakers in the old town. The checked /ɑʔ/ and /əʔ/ rime series are merged by some speakers.

Younger speakers split the /o/ rime based on its distribution in Standard Mandarin. When in Standard Mandarin the rime is -u, younger speakers realise it as /u/; when in Standard Mandarin the rime is -uo, younger speakers say /ou/.

There are minor differences in tone distribution and sandhi chains between different age groups.

As mentioned above, some speakers may import colloquial pronunciations from nearby Wu varieties. The effect is most pronounced in the speech of younger speakers and female speakers.

== See also ==
- Early Mandarin
- Wu Chinese
  - Shanghainese
  - Suzhounese
  - Ningbonese
- List of varieties of Chinese
- Chinatowns in Queens § Flushing
