= Ningbo dialect =

Dialect of Wu Chinese

- Yong-Jiang
- 寧波閒話
- Pronunciation: ɲìɲ.pɐ́u.ɛ́.ó~ɲìɲ.póʔ.ɛ́.ó
- Native to: People's Republic of China
- Region: Ningbo & Zhoushan, Zhejiang province
- Ethnicity: Ningbo people (Han Chinese)
- Language family: Sino-Tibetan: Sinitic; Chinese; Wu; Taihu; Ningbo dialect

Language codes
- ISO 639-3: –
- Glottolog: ning1280
- Linguasphere: 79-AAA-dbf (also 79-AAA-dbg on Zhoushan archipelago)

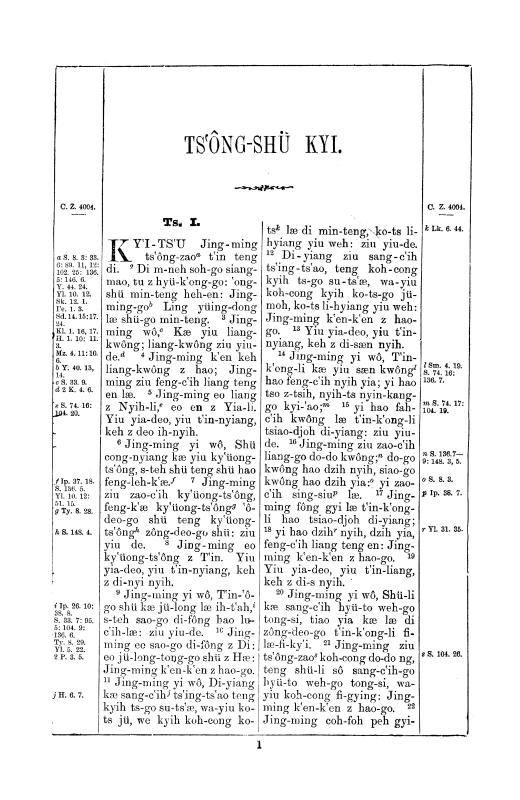
Bible in Ningbo Romanised (Genesis), published by the British and Foreign Bible Society.

The Ningbo dialect (Chinese: 宁波话/寧波話, 宁波闲话/寧波閒話) is a dialect of Wu Chinese, one subdivision of Chinese language. Ningbo dialect is spoken throughout Ningbo and Zhoushan prefectures, in Zhejiang province.

== Intelligibility ==
Ningbo dialect native speakers generally understand Shanghainese, another dialect of Wu. However, Shanghainese speakers do not always have full understanding of the Ningbo dialect. It is not mutually intelligible with Mandarin Chinese, or any other subdivision of the Chinese languages. The Ningbo dialect is considered a Yongjiang dialect or Mingzhou dialect (as both terms are synonymous), and is closely related to the Taihu Wu dialects of Zhoushan. In terms of inter-intelligibility between dialects within the Yong-Jiang subgroup, they can be more accurately described as 'accents' (腔) as these dialects are relatively uniform and almost identical to each other aside from pronunciation differences and some minor lexical differences.

== Phonology ==
=== Initials ===
Initial consonants
		Labial	Dental/Alveolar	Alveolo-Palatal	Velar	Glottal
Nasal		m	n	ɲ	ŋ	
Plosive	tenuis	p	t		k	ʔ
Plosive	aspirated	pʰ	tʰ		kʰ	
Plosive	voiced	b	d		ɡ	
Affricate	tenuis		ts	tɕ		
Affricate	aspirated		tsʰ	tɕʰ		
Affricate	voiced		dz	dʑ		
Fricative	voiceless	f	s	ɕ		h
Fricative	voiced	v	z	ʑ		ɦ
Lateral			l			

=== Finals ===
Vowel nuclei
	Front		Central	Back
	Unrounded	Rounded	Central	Back
Close	/i/	/y, ʏ/		/u/
Close-mid	/e/	/ø/		/o/
Open-mid	/ɛ/		/ə/	/ɔ/
Open			/a/	
Diphthong	/ɐi, ɐu, œʏ/			

Finals
Coda		Open			Nasal			Glottal stop		
Medial		∅	j	w	∅	j	w	∅	j	w
Nucleus	i	i			in			jeʔ		
Nucleus	y	y			yn			ɥøʔ		
Nucleus	ʏ	ʏ								
Nucleus	u	u								
Nucleus	e	e								
Nucleus	ø	ø								
Nucleus	o	o			oŋ	joŋ		oʔ	joʔ	
Nucleus	ɛ	ɛ		wɛ						
Nucleus	ə				ən		wən			
Nucleus	ɔ	ɔ	jɔ		ɔ̃	jɔ̃	wɔ̃			
Nucleus	a	a	ja	wa	ã	jã	wã	aʔ		waʔ
Nucleus	ɐi	ɐi		wɐi						
Nucleus	ɐu	ɐu								
Nucleus	œʏ	œʏ								

Syllabic continuants: [z̩] [z̩ʷ] [m̩] [n̩] [ŋ̍] [l̩]

Notes:

- The table contains two additional finals /yɲ, ɥøʔ/. These have merged with /joŋ, joʔ/ respectively in younger generations.
- /y, ʏ/ are similar in pronunciation, differing slightly in lip rounding ([y, iᵝ] respectively). The two are merged in younger generations.
- /j/ is pronounced [ɥ] before rounded vowels.

The Middle Chinese [-ŋ] rimes are retained, while [-n] and [-m] are either retained or have disappeared in the Ningbo dialect. Middle Chinese [-p -t -k] rimes have become glottal stops, [-ʔ].

=== Tones ===
Tones
	Middle Chinese tone			
	píng 平	shǎng 上	qù 去	rù 入
yīn 阴	˥˧ (53)	˧˥ (35)	˦ (44)	ʔ˥ (55)
yáng 阳	˨˦ (24)	˨˩˧ (213)		ʔ˩˨ (12)

== Examples ==
唱月亮

月亮菩薩彎彎上，彎到小姑進后堂。
后堂空，拜相公，
相公念經，打一天井，
天井隔笆，打一稻花，
稻花耘田，打一團箕。

火瑩頭

火瑩頭，夜夜紅，
阿公挑擔賣碗蔥，
新婦織麻糊燈籠，
阿婆箝牌捉牙虫，
兒子看鴨撩屙虫。

== See also ==
- Wu Chinese
  - Shanghainese
  - Suzhounese
  - Hangzhounese
- List of varieties of Chinese
