= Wuxi dialect =

Dialect of Wu Chinese

Wuxi
- 无锡话/無錫話
- Native to: People's Republic of China
- Region: Wuxi, Jiangsu province
- Language family: Sino-Tibetan: Sinitic; Chinese; Wu; Taihu; Su–Jia–Hu; Wuxi

Language codes
- ISO 639-3: –
- Glottolog: wuxi1234

Wuxi dialect
- Simplified Chinese: 无锡话
- Traditional Chinese: 無錫話
Transcriptions
Standard Mandarin
- Hanyu Pinyin: wu/ xi- hua\
Wu
- Romanization: mu^{1} sik^{1} wo^{3}
Yue: Cantonese
- Jyutping: mou sek wa

Reading “Lang Tao Sha Ling” by Li Yu in Wuxinese

The Wuxi dialect (Simplified Chinese: 无锡话; Traditional Chinese: 無錫話; Pinyin: Wúxīhuà, Wu: mu^{1} sik^{1} wo^{3} (Wu Chinese pronunciation: [vu˨˨˧ siɪʔ˦ ɦu˨]), is a dialect of Wu. It is spoken in the city of Wuxi in Jiangsu province, China.

It has many similarities with Shanghainese and the Suzhou dialect. It is mutually intelligible with the Changzhou dialect to which it is most closely related. It is not at all mutually intelligible with Mandarin, China's official language.

== Phonology ==
The following charts use Wugniu romanization.

=== Initials ===
Initial Consonants
		Labial	Dental	Alveolar	Palatal	Velar	Glottal
Nasal		m ⟨m⟩ 明	n ⟨n⟩ 南		ɲ ⟨n⟩ 疑	ŋ ⟨ng⟩ 牙	
Plosive/ Affricate	voiceless	p ⟨p⟩ 幫	t ⟨t⟩ 端	ts ⟨t⟩ 精	tɕ ⟨c⟩ 見	k ⟨k⟩ 光	ʔ ⟨'⟩ 影
Plosive/ Affricate	aspirated	pʰ ⟨ph⟩ 滂	tʰ ⟨th⟩ 透	tsʰ ⟨tsh⟩ 清	tɕʰ ⟨ch⟩ 溪	kʰ ⟨kh⟩ 框	
Plosive/ Affricate	slack voice	b ⟨b⟩ [平]	d ⟨d⟩ 定		dʑ ⟨j⟩ 群	g ⟨g⟩ 狂	
Fricative	voiceless	f ⟨f⟩ 敷		s ⟨s⟩ 心	ɕ ⟨sh⟩ 曉	x ⟨h⟩ 好	
Fricative	slack voice	v ⟨v⟩ 奉	z ⟨z⟩ 邪				ɦ ⟨gh⟩ 匣
Lateral			l ⟨l⟩ 來				

=== Finals ===
Finals
Medial	Nucleus																	
Medial	∅	ɑ	ɐ	o	ɵ	ᴇ	ɛ	əu	ei	ã	ɑ̃	ən	oŋ	aʔ	ɑʔ	əʔ	oʔ	liquid
∅	ɿ ⟨y⟩ 絲	ɑ ⟨a⟩ 阿	ɐ ⟨au⟩ 奧	o ⟨o⟩ 叉	ɵ ⟨oe⟩ 安	ᴇ ⟨e⟩ 愛	ɛ ⟨ae⟩ 蠻	əu ⟨ou⟩ 河	ei ⟨ei⟩ 歐	ã ⟨an⟩ 亨	ɑ̃ ⟨aon⟩ 昂	ən ⟨en⟩ 恩	oŋ ⟨on⟩ 翁	aʔ ⟨aeq⟩ 額	ɑʔ ⟨aq⟩ 拆	oʔ ⟨oq⟩ 惡	əʔ ⟨eq⟩ 不	əl ⟨r⟩ 而
i	i ⟨i⟩ 衣	iɑ ⟨ia⟩ 亞	iɐ ⟨iau⟩ 要	io ⟨io⟩ 靴	iɵ ⟨ioe⟩ 淵	iɪ ⟨ie⟩ 煙		iəɯ ⟨ieu⟩ 優		iã ⟨ian⟩ 陽	iɑ̃ ⟨iaon⟩ 旺	in ⟨in⟩ 賓	ioŋ ⟨ion⟩ 雍	iaʔ ⟨iaeq⟩ 俠	iɑʔ ⟨iaq⟩ 藥	ioʔ ⟨ioq⟩ 浴	iəʔ ⟨ieq⟩ 一	m ⟨m⟩ 嘸
u	u ⟨u⟩ 無	uɑ ⟨ua⟩ 娃			uɵ ⟨uoe⟩ 碗	uᴇ ⟨ue⟩ 為	uɛ ⟨uae⟩ 彎			uã ⟨uan⟩ 橫	uɑ̃ ⟨uan⟩ 黃	uən ⟨un⟩ 溫		uaʔ ⟨uaeq⟩ 劃		uəʔ ⟨ueq⟩ 活		n ⟨n⟩ 嗯
y	y ⟨iu⟩ 於											yən ⟨iuen⟩ 雲		yaʔ ⟨iuaeq⟩ 曰		yəʔ ⟨iueq⟩ 缺		ŋ ⟨ng⟩ 魚
ɥ	ɥ ⟨yu⟩ 除																	

=== Tones ===
Tones
	Middle Chinese tone			
	píng 平	shǎng 上	qù 去	rù 入
yīn 陰	˥˥ (55)	˧˨˦ (324)	˧˦ (34)	˥ (5)
yáng 陽	˩˧ (13)	˨˧˨ (232)	˨˩˧ (213)	˨˧ (23)

== Bibliography ==
- Wu Dialect Association. "Wuxi Dialect Pinyin Scheme". wu-chinese.com.
