= Suzhou dialect =

Dialect of Wu Chinese

Suzhounese
- 蘇州閒話；苏州闲话; Sou-tseu ghé-ghô
- Pronunciation: [soʊ˥tsøʏ˥꜓ ɦɛ˨˨˧꜕ɦo˨˧˩꜔] or [soʊ˥tsøʏ˥꜓ ɦɛ˨˨˦꜔ɦo˨˧˩꜕꜖]
- Native to: China
- Region: Suzhou and southeast Jiangsu province
- Language family: Sino-Tibetan: Sinitic; Chinese; Wu; Taihu; Suzhou–Shanghai–Jiaxing (Su-Hu-Jia); Suzhounese
- Writing system: Chinese characters

Language codes
- ISO 639-3: –
- ISO 639-6: suji
- Glottolog: suzh1234
- Linguasphere: 79-AAA-dbb

Suzhou dialect
- Traditional Chinese: 蘇州話
- Simplified Chinese: 苏州话
Transcriptions
Standard Mandarin
- Hanyu Pinyin: Sūzhōuhuà
Yue: Cantonese
- Yale Romanization: Sōujāu wá
- Jyutping: sou1 zau1 waa2

Alternative Chinese name
- Traditional Chinese: 蘇州閒話
Transcriptions
Wu
- Suzhounese: Sou-tseu ghé-ghô

Suzhounese (Suzhounese: 蘇州閒話; sou^{1} tseu^{1} ghe^{2} gho^{6}), also known as the Suzhou dialect (alternatively Soochow dialect), is the variety of Chinese traditionally spoken in the city of Suzhou in Jiangsu, China. Suzhounese is a variety of Wu Chinese, and was traditionally considered the Wu Chinese prestige dialect. Suzhounese has a large vowel inventory and it is relatively conservative in initials by preserving voiced consonants from Middle Chinese.

== Distribution ==
Suzhou dialect is spoken within the city itself and the surrounding area, including migrants living in nearby Shanghai.

The Suzhou dialect is mutually intelligible with dialects spoken in its satellite cities such as Kunshan, Changshu, and Zhangjiagang, as well as those spoken in its former satellites Wuxi and Shanghai. It is also partially intelligible with dialects spoken in other areas of the Wu cultural sphere such as Hangzhou and Ningbo. However, it is not mutually intelligible with Cantonese or Standard Chinese; but, as all public schools and most broadcast communication in Suzhou use Mandarin exclusively, nearly all speakers of the dialect are at least bilingual. Owing to migration within China, many residents of the city cannot speak the local dialect but can usually understand it after a few months or years in the area.

== Grammar ==
=== Personal pronouns ===
Pronoun	Number	Word	Pinyin	IPA
1st	Singular	吾	ngou6	ŋəu
1st	Plural	伲	gni6	nʲi
2nd	Singular	倷	ne6	ne
2nd	Plural	唔笃	n6 toq7	n toʔ
3rd	Singular	俚	li1	li
3rd	Singular	俚倷	li1 ne6	li ne
3rd	Singular	唔倷	n1 ne6	n ne
3rd	Plural	俚笃	li1 toq7	li toʔ

Second and third-person pronouns are suffixed with 笃 [toʔ] for the plural. The first-person plural is a separate root, 伲 [nʲi].

=== Demonstrative ===
Proximal		Neutral		Distal	
哀	e1	搿	geq8	弯	ue1
该	ke1	搿	geq8	归	kue1

In the Suzhou dialect, geq8 /ɡəʔ/ [gə̯] is a very special demonstrative that is used alongside a separate set of proximal and distal demonstratives. geq8 can indicate referents appearing in a speech situation, which may be close to or far away from the deictic center, and under these conditions, geq8 is always used in combination with gestures. Hence geq8 can serve both proximal and distal functions.

哀 with 该 and 弯 with 归 means exactly the same thing and only differ in pronunciation. The use of neutral demonstrative pronoun became clear once proximal and neutral demonstrative pronouns are used.

- 哀杯茶是吾葛，掰杯茶是僚葛，弯杯茶是俚葛。

When "搿" refers to time, there is no need to use the proximal and distal in opposition. The role of the neutral demonstrative is very obvious.

- 抗战是民国二十六年到民国三十四年，掰歇(弯歇)辰光日脚勿好过。

In this sentence, "掰歇(弯歇)" cannot be replaced by "哀歇" because the Anti-Japanese War happened more than fifty years ago, so only the neutral or distal demonstrative can be used, not proximal.

When not referring to time, the proximal "哀" and the neutral demonstrative "掰" can be interchanged. For example, the "掰" in "掰个人勿认得" can be replaced by "哀".

"哀", "该", "掰", "弯" and "归" cannot be used as subjects or objects alone, but must be combined with the following quantifiers, locative words, etc.

Suzhou		Mandarin	English
哀葛	e1 keq7	这个	this (thing)
哀点	e1 tie3	这些	these
哀歇	e1 shieq3	这时候	this (moment)
哀呛	e1 tie3	这阵子	this (period)
哀面	e1 mie6	这边	this (side)
哀搭	e1 taeq7	这里	this place (here)

Example phrases:

- 哀歇啥辰光则？

现在什么时候了？ What time is it now?

- 哀呛倷身体好啘？

现阵子你身体好吗？ How are you now?

== Varieties ==
Some non-native speakers of Suzhou speak the Suzhou dialect in a "stylized variety" to tell tales.

== Phonology ==
=== Initials ===
Initial consonants
		Labial	Dental/Alveolar	Alveolo-palatal	Velar	Glottal
Nasal		m	n	ȵ	ŋ	
Plosive	tenuis	p	t		k	ʔ
Plosive	aspirated	pʰ	tʰ		kʰ	
Plosive	voiced	b	d		ɡ	
Affricate	tenuis		ts	tɕ		
Affricate	aspirated		tsʰ	tɕʰ		
Affricate	voiced			dʑ		
Fricative	voiceless	f	s	ɕ		h
Fricative	voiced	v	z			ɦ
Lateral			l			

The Suzhou dialect has series of voiced, voiceless, and aspirated stops, and voiceless and voiced fricatives. Moreover, palatalized initials also occur.

Voiced obstruents /b d ɡ dʑ v z/ are typologically partially voiced instead of fully voiced. These consonants are devoiced word/phrase-initially, but are fully voiced within a phrase. This is most apparent for the fricatives /v z/ becoming [f s]. Because of this devoicing, in single-syllable forms the distinction is actually the tone contour.

The glottal initials /ʔ ɦ/ disappear if they are not at the beginning of a word/phrase, resulting in a smooth vocalic transition from the previous syllable. In this regard, it is possible to analyze both initials as a single phonological null onset /∅︀-/ when in this environment.

蛙 /ʔo⁴⁴/ ≠ 华 /ɦo²²³/, but 青蛙 = 清华 [tsʰin‿o⁴⁰]

=== Finals ===
Vowel nuclei
	Front		Central	Back
	Unrounded	Rounded	Central	Back
Apical	ɿ	ʮ		
Fricated	i	y		u
(Near-)Close	ɪ	ʏ	ɵ	o
Mid	ɛ		ə	
Open	æ		(a)	ɑ
Diphthong	øʏ, oʊ			

Finals
Medial	Rime																
Medial	∅		ɑ	æ	ɛ	ɵ	øʏ	oʊ	ã	ɑ̃	ən	oŋ	aʔ	ɑʔ	əʔ	oʔ	liquid
∅	ɿ ⟨y⟩ 次師是	ʮ ⟨y⟩ 知書時	ɑ ⟨a⟩ 拉街蟹	æ ⟨au⟩ 超刀高	ɛ ⟨e⟩ 追丹改	ɵ ⟨oe⟩ 半專端	ʏ→øʏ ⟨eu⟩ 州丟狗	oʊ ⟨ou⟩ 多土河	ã ⟨an⟩ 浜張打	ɑ̃ ⟨aon⟩ 糖康裝	ən ⟨en⟩ 本春能	oŋ ⟨on⟩ 東工翁	aʔ ⟨aeq⟩ 殺搭鴨	ɑʔ ⟨aq⟩ 百拆客	əʔ ⟨eq⟩ 不哲得	oʔ ⟨oq⟩ 八足各	əl ⟨er⟩ 而爾耳 (Note: 耳 only has this final in literary pronunciation.)
i	i ⟨i⟩ 基錢微	ɪ ⟨ie⟩ 邊全也 (Note: 也 only has this final in literary pronunciation.)	iɑ ⟨ia⟩ 借家寫 (Note: 家 only has this final in literary pronunciation.)	iæ ⟨iau⟩ 焦刁要	(iɛ→iɪ→ɪ)		(iʏ→ʏ)		iã ⟨ian⟩ 想良姜	iɑ̃ ⟨iaon⟩ 降江 (Note: 降 and 江 only have this final in literary pronunciation)旺 (Note: 旺 only has this final in colloquial pronunciation.)	in ⟨in⟩ 平心英	ioŋ ⟨ion⟩ 濃兇泳	iaʔ ⟨iaeq⟩ 甲夾 (Note: 甲 and 夾 only has this final in literary pronunciation.)	iɑʔ ⟨iaq⟩ 掠虐俠	iəʔ ⟨iq⟩ 跌吉一	ioʔ ⟨ioq⟩ 曲局浴	m ⟨m⟩ 呣畝嘸 (Note: 呣 and 畝 only has this final in colloquial pronunciation.)
u	u ⟨u⟩ 婆夫符	o ⟨o⟩ 茶瓜花	uɑ ⟨ua⟩ 怪快歪		uɛ ⟨ue⟩ 回慣彎	uɵ ⟨uoe⟩ 官寬歡			uã ⟨uan⟩ 橫	uɑ̃ ⟨uaon⟩ 光狂荒	uən ⟨uen⟩ 昆混溫		uaʔ ⟨uaeq⟩ 刮甩滑		uəʔ ⟨ueq⟩ 骨忽活		
y	y ⟨iu⟩ 居女羽	ʏ ⟨ieu⟩ 九丘牛				yɵ ⟨ioe⟩ 捐原圓					yn~yən ⟨iun⟩ 群訓雲		yaʔ ⟨iuaeq⟩ 曰 (Note: 曰 is the only character with this final, only used for classical literary recitation)		yəʔ ⟨iuq⟩ 粵決菊		ŋ ⟨ng⟩ 五魚午 (Note: 魚 and 午 only have this final in colloquial pronunciation.)

Notes:

- The Suzhou dialect has a rare contrast between "fricative vowels" /i y u/ and ordinary vowels /ɪ ʏ o/.
  - Only the open-syllable occurrences of /i y u/ are fricated. When used as a glide or followed by a nasal they are plain vowels.
  - phonetically, /ɪ ʏ/ are regular plain vowels [i y], while /i y u/ have further constriction
    - an acoustic study found /i y/ to be phonetically syllabic voiced laminal post-alveolar fricatives [ʒ̻̍ ʒ̻̍ʷ], and /u/ to be a syllabic voiced bilabial or labiodental fricative depending on the preceding consonant [β̩~v̩]
  - in open syllables, /o/ is articulated close to a position for a close back vowel [o̝]
- /j/ is pronounced [ɥ] before rounded vowels.
- /ɛ/ is a true mid vowel, [ɛ̝]. May also be transcribed with the Sinological symbol /ᴇ/.
- Depending on the source, transcriptions differ:
  - /oʊ/ may also be transcribed as /əu/
  - /ɵ/ may also be transcribed as /ø/; also applies to on-glide final rhymes /jɵ/ (/iø/) and /wɵ/ (/uø/)
  - /øʏ/ may also be transcribed as /ʏ/
  - Close vowels /ɪ ʏ/ may be analyzed as diphthongs and transcribed as /iɪ iʏ/

Comparison of vowels in open rhymes (not including glides)
	次	處	衣	雨	烟	有	夫	歐	半	巴	海	辦	河	好	家
Wang (2011)	ɿ	ʮ	i	y	ɪ	ʏ	v	øʏ	ø	o	ᴇ		əu	æ	ɑ
Ye (1988, 1993)	ɿ	ʮ	i	y	iɪ	iʏ	u	ʏ	ø	o	ᴇ		əu	æ	ɑ
Li (1998)	ɿ	ʮ	i	y	iɪ	(Note: merged into /iø/)	u	ei	ø	o	ᴇ		ou	æ	ɒ
Wugniu (Note: prior to ~2020 it used Ye's analysis /i y iɪ iʏ/)	ɿ	ʮ	iⱼ	yⱼ	i	y	u	øʏ	ø	o	ᴇ		əu	æ	ɑ
Ling (2009)	ɿ	ʮ	ʒ̻̍	ʒ̻̍ʷ	i	y	β~v	œ̆y	ɵ̝	o̝	ɛ̝		ɔ̆u	æ	ɑ
Bu "Quain" (2025)	z̩	ʒ̩^{w}	i^{ʑ}	y^{ʑ^{w}}	i	y	u^{β}	ʏ	ɵ	o	e	ɛ	əu^{β}	a (Note: identified as highly variable, ranges from [ɛ̞~æ~a~ä~ɐ~äu~ɐu])	ɑ
Qian (1992)	ɿ	ʮ_{ʅ}	i_{j}	y_{ʯ}	iɪ	(Note: inconsistently described as either merging into /iø/ or /^{ø}ʏ/)	u	ɘɪ	ɵ	o	ᴇ		ɜu	æ	ɒ
Yuan (1960)	ɿ	ʮ	i	y	ɪ, (iɪ)	iʏ	u	ʏ	ø	o	ᴇ		əu	æ	ɒ
Chao (1928) (Note: diacritics are difficult to read due to being handwritten)	ɿ	ʮ_{ʅ}	i,i_{j}	y_{(ʯ)}	iɪ	ʏ (Note: unclear if a merger or predates the split)	v_{ʉ}~ʉ	^{ø}ʏ	ɵ꭫	o	ᴇ		ɜu꭫	ɐ꭫~æ	ɒ
late-19th century	ɿ	ʯ	i	y	iɛ̃	iʏ (Note: syllables in this rhyme with dental onsets not yet depalatalized into merging with contemporary /əʏ/, modern /ʏ~øʏ/)	u (Note: syllables in this rhyme following non-labial onsets not yet diphthongized to modern /əu/)	əʏ	œ̃	o	e	æ̃	u, ɔ (Note: /ɔ/ reflected in syllables 多拿)	ɐɵ	ɒ

==== Historical finals ====
The Suzhou dialect allows a nasal coda but does not distinguish between them. As such, the Middle Chinese nasal codas *-m *-n *-ŋ have largely either merged or been lost depending on the vowel it follows. Historical *-ŋ rimes following certain vowels are distinguished as the nasalized vowels /ã ɑ̃/, but otherwise merge into modern /-n/. Historical *-n and *-m rimes are entirely merged and also result in modern /-n/, or are lost after certain vowels becoming modern /ɪ ɛ ɵ/. Monophthongization of the historical diphthong rime *-ɑi (as seen in Modern Standard Chinese: 海; pinyin: hǎi) resulted in a high-mid vowel /e/ distinct from the /ɛ/ that arose from the historical nasal rimes *-an/am (as seen in Modern Standard Chinese: 班; pinyin: bān). The distinction between /e ɛ/ is preserved within some Pingtan opera performers, but has merged together in general speech.

Middle Chinese *-p *-t *-k rimes have become glottal stops, [-ʔ]. Like other Northern Wu varieties, syllables with an underlying glottal stop coda /-ʔ/ usually manifest as a shortening of the vowel instead of an actual glottal stop [-ʔ], unless before a pause or at the end of an utterance.

=== Tones ===
Suzhou is considered to have seven tones. However, since the tone split dating from Middle Chinese still depends on the voicing of the initial consonant. Yang tones are only found with voiced initials, namely [b d ɡ z v dʑ ʑ m n nʲ ŋ l ɦ], while the yin tones are only found with voiceless initials. These constitute just three phonemic tones: ping, shang, and qu. (Ru syllables are phonemically toneless.)

Tone chart
Tone number	Wugniu Tone	Tone name	Tone letters	Description
1	1	yin ping (阴平)	˦ (44)	high
2	2	yang ping (阳平)	˨˨˦ (224)	level-rising
3	3	shang (阴上)	˥˨ (52)	high falling
4	5	yin qu (阴去)	˦˩˨ (412)	dipping
5	6	yang qu (阳去)	˨˧˩ (231)	rising-falling
6	7	yin ru (阴入)	˦ʔ (4)	high checked
7	8	yang ru (阳入)	˨˧ʔ (23)	rising checked

In Suzhou, the Middle Chinese 阳上 tone and 阳去 tones have fully merged as (2)31. The original 阳去 313 tone possibly still occurs in tone sandhi patterns as the second element of a chain, following a 阴入 syllable (though it could be analyzed differently; see Tone Sandhi section below).

Therefore, 买 and 卖 has exactly the same pronunciation in literary and colloquial readings ^{6}ma /mɑ˨˧˩/, but can be distinguished in tone sandhi. 弗买 [fəʔ mɑ^{551}] ≠ 弗卖 [fəʔ mɑ^{5523}].

==== Tone Sandhi ====
Tone in Suzhou dialect, like other Northern Wu varieties is generally grouped by phrasal tone pattern, also called sandhi chains or sandhi domains.

An analysis by Wang (2011) describes Suzhou tone sandhi as rightward tone-spreading of the left-most (i.e. initial) syllable of a phrase. Such described "left-prominent" phrases with non-checked initial syllables of a given length have one of five possible contours, each equivalent to each of the five tones. While generally described as rightward tone-spreading of the initial syllable, it is also common for the phrasal tone pattern to not be the same as that of the initial tone. This is currently the system used on Wiktionary entries with Suzhou data.

To distinguish the individual tone from the pattern expected from its tone spreading, the patterns themselves are referred to with the format of tone number + X (1x, 2x, 3x, etc.).

Non-checked initial syllable patterns
Initial syllable's tone	2-syllable	3-syllable	4-syllable	Chain
陰平 44	4 0 歡喜	4 4 0	4 4 4 0	1x
陽平 223	2 3 圍身	2 3 0	2 3 4 0	2x
上聲 52	52 1 寫意	52 1 0	52 1 1 0	3x
陰去 523	52 3 啥體	52 3 0	52 3 4 0	5x
陽去 231	23 1 後日	23 1 0	23 1 1 0	6x (or 4x)

A tone level of 0 in the above chart indicates a syllable with a neutral tone (轻声; 輕聲; qīngshēng; 'light tone'), functionally comparable to that of Standard Chinese. The surface realization at the end of an utterance is a low akin to downstep, but in flowing speech is a mid/neutral pitch or may appear to copy the previous tone target.

Additionally, Li (1998) describes the 5x chain such that the second syllable has a slight rise. Li also describes a higher mid/high-level for the second syllable of a 6x chain. Li's 1x chain describes the pitch declining after the second syllable.

Tone pattern	2-syllable	3-syllable
阳上式 (6x/4x)	23 1 两人	23 44 21 (Note: described as /23 33 21/ on the following page) 同志们，碰碰看，五十岁
去声式 (5x)	52 23 四首	52 23 21 解放军，打火机，卷心菜

Tone pattern	2-syllable	3-syllable	4-syllable	5-syllable
阴平式 (1x)	44 21 天花	44 44 21 天花板	44 44 33 21 天花乱坠	44 44 33 22 21 天花板浪向

In phrases with checked initial syllables, the first two tones determine the overall contour. The resulting contour can be summarized as retaining the tone class (平上去) of the second syllable, but not the voicing class (陰陽). Both Tone 1 陰平 /44/ and Tone 2 陽平 /223/ will result in a Tone 2 contour (/223/). Both Tone 5 陰去 /523/ and Tone 6 陽去 /231/ will result in a Tone 5 contour (/523/).

Checked initial syllable patterns
First tone	Second tone	2-syllable	3-syllable	4-syllable	Chain
陰入 5	平聲; 44 or 223	4 23 塌車	4 23 0	4 23 4 0	7.2
陽入 23	平聲; 44 or 223	2 3 搿星	2 3 0	2 3 4 0	8.2
陰入 5	上聲 52	5 51 則到	5 51 0	5 51 1 0	7.3
陽入 23	上聲 52	2 51 杌子	2 51 0	2 51 1 0	8.3
陰入 5	去聲; 523 or 231	5 523 搭檔	5 52 3	5 52 2 3	7.5
陽入 23	去聲; 523 or 231	2 523 白菜	2 52 3	2 52 2 3	8.5
陰入 5ˀ	入聲; 5ˀ or 23ˀ	4 4 赤膊	4 4 0	4 4 2 0	7.7
陽入 23ˀ	入聲; 5ˀ or 23ˀ	3 4 直腳	3 4 0	3 4 2 0	8.7

Ye 1988 describes additional patterns where

- Tone 7 阴入 + Tone 1/3/5 retaining full tone, resulting in a /5ˀ 5/ pattern if Tone 7 阴入 is followed by Tone 1 阴平
- the original un-merged Yangshang 阳去 313 tone still occurs as the second element of a chain, following a 阴入 syllable (7.6 chain).
- The second syllable of an 8x chain having a low-falling /21/ regardless of original tone

However, Wang describes the same phrases differently, and so it is debatable whether these form distinct patterns:

Phrase	Wang 2011	Ye 1988
菊花 cioq ho	4 23 (p. 190)	˥ˀ ˥ (~4ˀ 44) (p. 124, 366)
綠豆 loq deu	2 51 (p. 191)	(~3ˀ 21) (p. 126, 361)
赤豆 tshaq deu	5 523 (p. 181)	5 313 (p. 119)
結冰 ciq pin	4 23 (p. 182)	5ˀ 5 (i.e. no change) (p. 124)

===== Tone category shifts =====
As mentioned above, the tone pattern of a phrase frequently does not match the expected pattern based on the initial syllable's underlying tone.

Most frequently:

- a phrase beginning with a Tone 3 syllable takes on the tone pattern expected of a Tone 5 syllable (in other words, a 5x chain) or a Tone 1 syllable (a 1x chain)
  - i.e. expected 3x > 5x or 1x
    - (5x) 短衫 : ^{5}toe_{3}-se_{1} [tɵ^{52} sɛ^{3}]
    - (1x) 暑假 : ^{1}syu_{3}-ka_{5} [sʮ^{44} kɑ^{0}]
- a phrase beginning with a Tone 5 syllable frequently takes on the tone pattern expected of a Tone 1 syllable (a 1x chain)
  - i.e. expected 5x > 1x
    - (1x) 菜飯 : ^{1}tshe_{5}-ve_{6} [tsʰɛ^{44} vɛ^{0}]
- a phrase beginning with a Tone 6 syllable frequently takes on the tone pattern expected of a Tone 2 syllable (a 2x chain)
  - i.e. expected 6x > 2x
    - (2x) 大菜 : ^{2}da_{6}-tshe_{5}, ^{2}dou_{6}-tshe_{5} [dɑ^{22} tsʰɛ^{33} ~ dəu^{22} tsʰɛ^{33}]
- less frequently, the above shifts can happen in reverse
  - i.e. expected 5x > 3x
  - i.e. expected 2x > 6x
- syllables following Tone 7 can also shift chains
  - Tone 7 + Tone 5/6 > (Tone 7 + Tone 1/2) > 7.2
  - Tone 7 + Tone 6 > 7.3
- most non-checked syllables following Tone 8 collapse into a falling tone, equivalent to an 8.3 chain
  - Tone 8 + {Tone 1, 2, 3, 5, 6} > 8.3

Functionally, a Tone 3 pattern (3x chain) is the least common to occur and mostly surfaces when the initial syllable is a numeral phrase (几时; 機時 ^{3}ci-zyu_{6} [tɕi⁵² zʮ¹]) or reduplicated verb (写写; 寫寫 ^{3}sia-sia_{3} [siɑ⁵² siɑ¹]). Below is a chart with examples of the common tone patterns:

Initial syllable's tone	Chains	2-syllable	3-syllable
陰平 44	1x	sin syu 新书	sy tsy lin 狮子林
陽平 223	2x	zie syu 泉水	waon thie gnioe 黃天源
陽平 223	6x	don zin 同情	don zy men 同志们
上聲 52	5x	tshau tsy 草纸	tan hou ci 打火机
上聲 52	3x	cieu ngeq 九月	
上聲 52	1x	khou nen 可能	
陰去 523	1x	syu ka 世界	
陰去 523	5x	ho kon 化工	cia faon ciun 解放军
陰去 523	3x	phiau lian 漂亮	
陽去 231	2x	zy ka 自家	dou khue deu 大块头
陽去 231	6x	gheu gnie 后年	ng seq se 五十岁
陽去 231	1x	lau sy 老师	

Initial Syllable	Chain	阴平 44	阳平 223	阴上 52	阴去 523	阳上去 231
陰入 4ˀ	7.2	tshaeq tsho 塌车	tsiq deu 节头		piq kou 不过	feq de 弗但
陰入 4ˀ	7.3			poq pau ve 八宝饭		
陰入 4ˀ	7.5				taeq taon 搭档	
陽入 23ˀ	8.3	gnioq te 褥单	ngoq jiau 乐桥		beq thi 鼻涕	gniq li 日里

===== Tone reduction =====
Wang (p. 50) additionally identifies a pattern where in certain constructions Tone 5 (/523/) followed by another syllable simplifies to [52] while the second syllable retains its full tone. This can be analyzed comparably to Shanghainese right-prominent sandhi that prioritizes the second syllable and reduces preceding syllables. This right-prominent sandhi pattern occurs commonly in Verb + Object compounds.

做人 tsəu^{523-52} ɲin^{223}

In addition to the above simplification of Tone 5 /523/ to [52], Li (p. 216) additionally describes Tone 2 /223/ and Tone 6 /231/ similarly simplifying to [23 ˨˧] in similar Verb + Object, as well as Adverb + Adjective structures

穷大 dʑioŋ^{223-23} dou^{231}
是鬼 zɿ^{231-23} tɕy^{52}
过桥 kou^{523-52} dʑiæ^{223}

Identified by Bu (2025) describing Suzhou pingtan (but also applicable to Suzhou dialect normally), such tonal reduction generally occurs particularly for Tone 2 and Tone 6 syllables even when not in sandhi chains, and can further reduce to a simple mid/low tone. Because it can occur outside of Verb + Object or Adverb + Adjective syntactic conditions, Bu considers this tonal reduction to simply be a reduction of non-final syllables motivated by those tones (Tone 5 /523/, Tone 2 /223/, Tone 6 /231/) underlyingly being longer and having more tonal targets.

我 是 {蘇 州 人}
^{6}ngou ^{6}zy {^{1}sou-tseu_{1}-gnin_{2}}
/ŋəu˨˧˩ zz̩˨˧˩ {səu˥ tsøʏ˥ ɲ̟iɲ˨˧}/
[ŋəuᵝ˨˧ zz̩˨˧~zz̩˨ {səuᵝ˥ tsʏ˥ ɲ̟iɲ˩}]
1sg COP {Suzhou person}
"I am a Soutseu native"

In contrast, Wang (p. 348) treats this pronoun + copula construction as a single 6x phrase.

{我 是} {老 三}
ŋəu‿zɿ^{231} læ‿sᴇ^{23}
{1sg COP} {Lao San}
"I am Lao San"

====== Casual Speech ======
There can be additional variation in how reduced the tones can become based on how casual the sentence is spoken by the speaker.

搿麽 倷 吃仔 飯 勒 再 去吧
{^{8}geq meq} ^{6}ne {^{7}chiq-^{3}tsy} ^{6}ve leq ^{5}tse {^{5}chi ba}
{ɡəʔ˨ məʔ˦} ne˨˧ {tɕʰiəʔ˦ tsz̩˥˩} vɛ˨˧ ləʔ˨ tse˥˩ {tɕʰi^{ʑ}˥˩ bɑ˨˧}
{ɡəʔ˨ məʔ˧} ne˨˧ {tɕʰiəʔ˦ tsz̩˥} vɛ˨˧ ləʔ˨ tse˥ {tɕʰi^{ʑ}˥˩ bɑ˨˧}
"So, maybe you eat your meal first and then go."

In the above sentence, the falling tone [˥˩] on 仔 tsy and 再 tse is reduced to a high-flat [˥] in casual speech, in addition to the Tone 6 /231 ˨˧˩/ (倷 ne, 飯 ve) and Tone 5 /523 ˥˩˧/ (再 tse, 去 chi) words already reducing to [23 ˨˧] and [52 ˥˩] even in slower speech.

In the case of casual speech spoken quickly, Wang does describe a pattern where the preceding syllable takes a neutral tone. If the word (often a pronoun, adverb, or quantifier) precedes another phrase, it can reduce to a simple /3/ tone. This reduced pattern can apply across polysyllabic words or even multiple words. This can be considered as describing the same phenomenon as above but with less phonetic detail.

交差 | kæ^{44-3} tsʰɑ^{44}
搿人有点弗大适意 | ɡəʔ^{23-3} ȵin^{223} ʏ‿tɪ^{231-33} fəʔ‿dɑ^{423-33} səʔ‿i^{5523}

====== Stress ======
The same phrase can take a different chain depending on which syllable or word is stressed.

看戏 /kʰø^{523} ɕi^{523}/ 'to watch shows/movies"
[kʰø‿ɕi^{40}] (a 1x chain)

generally without emphasis, it would be treated as a single concept and be a single sandhi chain.

[kʰø^{523-52} ɕi^{523}] or [kʰø^{523-3} ɕi^{523}]

emphasizing what is being watched—the verb is treated separately and reduced to either /52/ or /3/

== Suzhou dialect in literature ==
Ballad-narratives

A "ballad–narrative" (說唱詞話) known as "The story of Xue Rengui crossing the sea and Pacifying Liao" (薛仁貴跨海征遼故事), which is about the Tang dynasty hero Xue Rengui is believed to have been written in the Suzhou dialect.

Novels

Han Bangqing wrote The Sing-song Girls of Shanghai, one of the earliest novels in Wu dialect, in Suzhou dialect. Suzhou serves as an important drive for Han to write the novel. Suzhou dialect is used in innovative methods to demonstrate urban space and time, as well as the interrupted narrative aesthetics, making it an integral part of an effort, which is presented as a fundamental and self-conscious new thing. Han's novel also inspired other authors to write in Wu dialect.

== See also ==
- Wu Chinese
  - Shanghainese
  - Hangzhounese
  - Ningbonese
- List of varieties of Chinese
