= Tenuis consonant =

Obstruent that is voiceless, unaspirated and unglottalized

Tenuis

◌˭

Encoding
- Entity (decimal): &#749;
- Unicode (hex): U+02ED
Image

In linguistics, a tenuis consonant (/ˈtɛn.juːɪs/ or /ˈtɛnuːɪs/) (Note: The latter to better distinguish from 'tenuous'. Plural: tenues, /ˈtɛn.juːiːz/ or /ˈtɛnuːiːz/.) is an obstruent that is voiceless, unaspirated and unglottalized.

In other words, it has the "plain" phonation of [p, t, ts, tʃ, k] with a voice onset time close to zero (a zero-VOT consonant), as Spanish p, t, ch, k or English p, t, k after s (spy, sty, sky).

For most languages, the distinction is relevant only for stops and affricates. However, a few languages have analogous series for fricatives. Mazahua, for example, has ejective, aspirated, and voiced fricatives /sʼ sʰ z/ alongside tenuis /s/, parallel to stops /ɗ tʼ tʰ d/ alongside tenuis /t/.

Many click languages have tenuis click consonants alongside voiced, aspirated, and glottalized series.

== Transcription ==
In transcription, tenuis consonants are not normally marked explicitly, and consonants written with voiceless IPA letters, such as ⟨p, t, ts, tʃ, k⟩, are typically assumed to be unaspirated and unglottalized unless otherwise indicated. However, aspiration is often left untranscribed if no contrast needs to be made, like in English, so there is an explicit diacritic for a lack of aspiration in the extensions to the IPA, a superscript equal sign: ⟨p˭, t˭, ts˭, tʃ˭, k˭⟩. It is sometimes seen in phonetic descriptions of languages. There are also languages, such as the Northern Ryukyuan languages, whose phonologically-unmarked sound is aspirated, and the tenuis consonants are marked and transcribed explicitly.

In Unicode, the symbol is encoded at U+02ED ˭ MODIFIER LETTER UNASPIRATED.

An early IPA convention was to write the tenuis stops ⟨pᵇ, tᵈ, kᶢ⟩ etc. if the plain letters ⟨p, t, k⟩ were used for aspirated consonants (as they are in English): [ˈpaɪ] 'pie' vs. [ˈspᵇaɪ] 'spy'.

== Etymology ==
The term tenuis comes from Latin translations of Ancient Greek grammar, which differentiated three series of consonants, voiced β δ γ /b d ɡ/, aspirate φ θ χ /pʰ tʰ kʰ/, and tenuis π τ κ /p˭ t˭ k˭/. Analogous series occur in many other languages. The term was widely used in 19th-century philology but became uncommon in the 20th.

== See also ==
- Grassmann's law
- Spiritus asper
- Spiritus lenis

== Sources ==
- Bussmann, 1996. Routledge Dictionary of Language and Linguistics
- R.L. Trask, 1996. A Dictionary of Phonetics and Phonology.
