= Voiceless dental and alveolar taps and flaps =

Consonantal sound represented by ⟨ɾ̥⟩ in IPA

Voiceless alveolar tap or flap

ɾ̥
- IPA number: 124 402A

Audio sample
- source · help

Encoding
- X-SAMPA: 4_0

Voiceless dental tap or flap

ɾ̪̊

Voiceless alveolar and dental taps (or flaps) are a type of consonantal sound used in some spoken languages, though only reported to exist as an allophone. The symbol in the International Phonetic Alphabet that represents this sound is ⟨ɾ̥⟩, a combination of the letter for the voiced alveolar tap/flap and a diacritic indicating voicelessness.

A similar sound, a voiceless alveolar tapped fricative reported for some languages including English, is actually a very brief voiceless alveolar non-sibilant fricative.

== Features ==
Features of a voiceless alveolar tap or flap:

- Its manner of articulation is tap or flap, which means it is produced with a single contraction of the muscles so that one articulator (usually the tongue) is thrown against another.
- Its place of articulation can be dental or alveolar, which means it can be articulated behind upper front teeth or at the alveolar ridge. It is most often apical, which means that it is pronounced with the tip of the tongue.
- Its phonation is voiceless, which means it is produced without vibrations of the vocal cords.
- It is an oral consonant, which means that air is not allowed to escape through the nose.
- It is a median consonant, which means it is produced by directing the airstream down the midline of the tongue, rather than to the sides.
- Its airstream mechanism is pulmonic, which means it is articulated by pushing air only with the intercostal muscles and abdominal muscles, as in most speech sounds.

== Occurrence ==
=== Dental ===
Language	Word	IPA	Meaning	Notes
English	throw	[θɾ̪̊oʊ]	'throw'	Allophone of /ɹ/ after /θ/.

=== Alveolar ===
Language		Word	IPA	Meaning	Notes
Bengali		আবার	[ˈäbäɾ̥]	'again'	Possible allophone of /ɹ/ in the syllable coda. See Bengali phonology
Catalan	Many Balearic speakers	mar	[ˈmäɾ̥]	'sea'	Apical. Possible allophone of /ɾ/ in the syllable coda. See Catalan phonology
Catalan	South-Western Catalonia	mar	[ˈmäɾ̥]	'sea'	Apical. Possible allophone of /ɾ/ in the syllable coda. See Catalan phonology
Catalan	Valencian	mar	[ˈmäɾ̥]	'sea'	Apical. Possible allophone of /ɾ/ in the syllable coda. See Catalan phonology
English	Irish	three	[θɾ̊iː]	'three'	Conservative accents. Corresponds to [ɹ ~ ɻ ~ ʁ] in other accents.
English	Scottish	three	[θɾ̊iː]	'three'	Most speakers. Others use [ɹ ~ r].
English	Older Received Pronunciation	three	[θɾ̊iː]	'three'	Allophone of /ɹ/.
English	Scouse	three	[θɾ̊iː]	'three'	Allophone of /ɹ/.
English	South African	three	[θɾ̊iː]	'three'	Broad accents. Can be [ɹ ~ r] instead.
Greek	Cypriot	αρφός	[ɐɾ̥ˈfo̞s]	'brother'	Allophone of /ɾ/ before voiceless consonants. May be a voiceless alveolar trill instead
Icelandic		hrafn	[ˈɾ̥apn̪̊]	'raven'	Realization of /r̥/ for some speakers. Also illustrates /n̥/. See Icelandic phonology
Portuguese	European	assar	[əˈsäɾ̥]	'to bake'	Apparent allophone of /ɾ/; distribution unclear, but common in the coda in Jesus (2001)'s corpus. See Portuguese phonology
Turkish		bir	[biɾ̝̊]	'one'	/ɾ/ is frequently devoiced word-finally and before a voiceless consonant. See Turkish phonology
Wu Chinese	Xuanzhou Wu (Nanling variety)	弟	/ɾ̥ɦi˨˦/	'brother'	/ɾ̥ɦ/ corresponds to /d/ in other varieties (cf. Shanghainese /di˩˦/). Xuanzhou varieties tend to have /ɾ/ as their primary realisation of this phoneme (cf. Tonglingese /ɾɦi˧˦/)

== See also ==
- Index of phonetics articles

== Notes ==
Place →	Labial					Coronal										Dorsal					Laryngeal			
Manner ↓	Bilabial		Labiodental		Linguolabial		Dental		Alveolar		Postalveolar		Retroflex		(Alveolo-)palatal		Velar		Uvular		Pharyngeal/epiglottal		Glottal	
Nasal	m̥	m	ɱ̊	ɱ		n̼	n̪̊	n̪	n̥	n	n̠̊	n̠	ɳ̊	ɳ	ɲ̊	ɲ	ŋ̊	ŋ	ɴ̥	ɴ				
Plosive	p	b	p̪	b̪	t̼	d̼	t̪	d̪	t	d			ʈ	ɖ	c	ɟ	k	ɡ	q	ɢ	ʡ		ʔ	
Sibilant affricate							t̪s̪	d̪z̪	ts	dz	t̠ʃ	d̠ʒ	tʂ	dʐ	tɕ	dʑ								
Non-sibilant affricate	pɸ	bβ	p̪f	b̪v			t̪θ	d̪ð	tɹ̝̊	dɹ̝	t̠ɹ̠̊˔	d̠ɹ̠˔			cç	ɟʝ	kx	ɡɣ	qχ	ɢʁ	ʡʜ	ʡʢ	ʔh	
Sibilant fricative							s̪	z̪	s	z	ʃ	ʒ	ʂ	ʐ	ɕ	ʑ								
Non-sibilant fricative	ɸ	β	f	v	θ̼	ð̼	θ	ð	θ̠	ð̠	ɹ̠̊˔	ɹ̠˔	ɻ̊˔	ɻ˔	ç	ʝ	x	ɣ	χ	ʁ	ħ	ʕ	h	ɦ
Approximant		β̞		ʋ				ð̞		ɹ		ɹ̠		ɻ		j		ɰ						˷
Tap/flap		ⱱ̟		ⱱ					ɾ̥	ɾ			ɽ̊	ɽ						ɢ̆		ʡ̆		
Trill	ʙ̥	ʙ							r̥	r		r̠	ɽ̊r̥	ɽr					ʀ̥	ʀ	ʜ	ʢ		
Lateral affricate									tɬ	dɮ			tꞎ	d𝼅	c𝼆	ɟʎ̝	k𝼄	ɡʟ̝						
Lateral fricative							ɬ̪		ɬ	ɮ			ꞎ	𝼅	𝼆	ʎ̝	𝼄	ʟ̝						
Lateral approximant								l̪	l̥	l		l̠	ɭ̊	ɭ	ʎ̥	ʎ	ʟ̥	ʟ		ʟ̠				
Lateral tap/flap									ɺ̥	ɺ			𝼈̊	𝼈		ʎ̆		ʟ̆						

		BL	LD	D	A	PA	RF	P	V	U
Implosive	Voiced	ɓ			ɗ		ᶑ	ʄ	ɠ	ʛ
Implosive	Voiceless	ɓ̥			ɗ̥		ᶑ̊	ʄ̊	ɠ̊	ʛ̥
Ejective	Stop	pʼ			tʼ		ʈʼ	cʼ	kʼ	qʼ
Ejective	Affricate		p̪fʼ	tθʼ	tsʼ	tʃʼ	tʂʼ	tɕʼ	kxʼ	qχʼ
Ejective	Fricative	ɸʼ	fʼ	θʼ	sʼ	ʃʼ	ʂʼ	ɕʼ	xʼ	χʼ
Ejective	Lateral affricate				tɬʼ			c𝼆ʼ	k𝼄ʼ	q𝼄ʼ
Ejective	Lateral fricative				ɬʼ					
Click (top: velar; bottom: uvular)	Tenuis	kʘ qʘ		kǀ qǀ	kǃ qǃ		k𝼊 q𝼊	kǂ qǂ		
Click (top: velar; bottom: uvular)	Voiced	ɡʘ ɢʘ		ɡǀ ɢǀ	ɡǃ ɢǃ		ɡ𝼊 ɢ𝼊	ɡǂ ɢǂ		
Click (top: velar; bottom: uvular)	Nasal	ŋʘ ɴʘ		ŋǀ ɴǀ	ŋǃ ɴǃ		ŋ𝼊 ɴ𝼊	ŋǂ ɴǂ	ʞ	
Click (top: velar; bottom: uvular)	Tenuis lateral				kǁ qǁ					
Click (top: velar; bottom: uvular)	Voiced lateral				ɡǁ ɢǁ					
Click (top: velar; bottom: uvular)	Nasal lateral				ŋǁ ɴǁ					
