= Shaoxing dialect =

Wu Chinese dialect

The Shaoxing dialect (simplified Chinese: 绍兴话/绍兴方言; traditional Chinese: 紹興話/紹興方言; pinyin: Shàoxīnghuà/Shàoxīng fāngyán) is a Wu dialect spoken in the city of Shaoxing more specifically in the city center of Yuecheng and its surrounding areas. It is a representative Wu dialect with a tripartite distinction on voiced stop initials and a textbook register split with each of the four tonal categories of Middle Chinese being divided into upper and lower registers. Within Wu, it is classified as a Northern Wu dialect belonging to the Taihu division within which it is classified under the Linshao subdivision (臨紹小片/临绍小片).

It is the pronunciation of the Shaoxing dialect which is the standard to be used on the texts of Yue opera. It is also the native language of Cai Yuanpei and Lu Xun whose Baihua was often peppered with phrases from his native dialect.

== Distribution ==
The suburban areas to the north and east stretching from Dongpu (东浦) to Doumen (斗门) and north of Pingshui (平水) in the southern suburban areas are basically the same as that of the city center. Outside of these areas, people may still speak "Shaoxing dialect," but there are noticeable differences between these speech forms and those of the main urban area of Shaoxing.

== Research into the Shaoxing dialect ==
The Shaoxing dialect has received an unusually large amount of attention. Documented research for the dialect has existed since the Kangxi era in the Qing dynasty, when there were three main works dealing with the Shaoxing dialect.

- 越语肯綮录 by Mao Qiling (毛奇龄)
- 越言释 by Ru Dunhe (茹敦和)
- 越谚 by Fan Yin (范寅)

In the modern era, Chao Yuen Ren documented four regions in Shaoxing in his Modern Wu Research (现代吴语研究). Besides Chao, the Shaoxing dialect has received the most attention from Chinese dialectologist Wang Futang (王福堂) whose 1959 Shaoxinghua jiyin (绍兴话记音) was the first full-length paper in the modern era dedicated wholly to the dialect. A concise grammar, phonology, and nearly 300 page word list of the dialect has been compiled by Yang Wei (杨葳) and Yang Jun (杨浚) in Shaoxing Fangyan (绍兴方言). There is also an English-language monograph The Phonology of Shaoxing Chinese by Zhang Jisheng and a handful of other works in Chinese.

The Shaoxing dialect is also mentioned in Zhejiang Fangyan Fenqu (浙江方言分区), Zhejiang Fangyanci (浙江方言词), and Shaoxingshi yanyu juan (绍兴市谚语卷). As with most locations in China, Shaoxing is also covered in the Linguistic Atlas of Chinese Dialects.

== Phonological inventory ==
=== Initials ===
Initials of Shaoxing dialect.
		Labial	Dental/Alveolar	Alveolo-Palatal	Velar	Glottal
Nasal		m	n	ɲ	ŋ	
Plosive	tenuis	p	t		k	ʔ
Plosive	aspirated	pʰ	tʰ		kʰ	
Plosive	voiced	b	d		ɡ	
Affricate	tenuis		ts	tɕ		
Affricate	aspirated		tsʰ	tɕʰ		
Affricate	voiced		dz	dʑ		
Fricative	voiceless	f	s	ɕ		h
Fricative	voiced	v	z	ʑ		ɦ
Lateral			l			

=== Finals ===
Finals of Shaoxing dialect
Coda		Open			Nasalized			Nasal			Glottal stop		
Medial		∅	j	w	∅	j	w	∅	j	w	∅	j	w
Nucleus	u	u											
Nucleus	ɤ	ɤ	jɤ					əŋ			əʔ		
Nucleus	o	o	jo	wo	ɵ̃	jɵ̃	wɵ̃	oŋ	joŋ	woŋ	oʔ	joʔ	woʔ
Nucleus	ɒ	ɒ	jɒ					ɒŋ	jɒŋ	wɒŋ			
Nucleus	a	a	ja	wa	ɛ̃	jɛ̃	wɛ̃	aŋ	jaŋ	waŋ	aʔ	jaʔ	waʔ
Nucleus	e	e	je	we	ẽ	jẽ					eʔ		weʔ
Nucleus	i	i						ɪŋ			ɪʔ		
Nucleus	y	y											

Syllabic continuants: [z̩] [m̩] [n̩] [ŋ̍] [l̩]

=== Citation tones ===
Citation Tones (Yang, 2000)
Register	Ping (平)	Shang (上)	Qu (去)	Ru (入)
Upper (陰)	42	35	33	4
Lower (陽)	21	13	22	2

Citation Tones (Tu Guoping, 2012)
Register	Ping (平)	Shang (上)	Qu (去)	Ru (入)
Upper (陰)	52	335	33	45
Lower (陽)	231	113	11	23

Citation Tones (Huang et al., 2007)
Register	Ping (平)	Shang (上)	Qu (去)	Ru (入)
Upper (陰)	41	55	44	5
Lower (陽)	15	22	31	32

== Syllable structure ==
=== Initials ===
Initial	Example characters
[p]	奔彪宝闭
[pʰ]	抛普配批
[b/pʱ]	盆瓢抱毙
[m]	盟袜摸芒
[f]	风法幅放
[v/fʱ]	奉罚伏亡
[t]	斗吊蹲冻
[tʰ]	偷挑探痛
[d/tʱ]	豆掉潭动
[n]	闹诺挪纳
[l]	拦率蓝勒
[ts]	钻赞照醉
[tsʰ]	川灿操菜
[dz/tsʱ]	缠残赵垂
[s]	涩送爽酸
[z/sʱ]	十字嚷善
[tɕ]	将经机举
[tɕʰ]	腔青启躯
[dʑ/tɕʱ]	墙近旗具
[ɕ]	虚洗仙勋
[ʑ/ɕʱ]	如自贱像
[k]	鸽甲广哥
[kʰ]	渴掐筐科
[g/kʱ]	柜轧狂溃
[ŋ]	外呆饿岸
[h]	荒轰黑夯
[ɦ]	员养荣药
Zero initial ([j], [w], or no initial)	衣乌挨汪

=== Rhymes ===
Rhyme	Example characters
[z̩]	资纸自治
[i]	地替弟贰
[u]	补都附簿
[y]	吕靴需语
[a]	爸他楷挨
[ia]	夜爷斜鸦
[ua]	拐快槐哇
[e]	还眉贝台
[ue]	柜会亏威
[ɤ]	谋否走口
[iɤ]	秋酒流右
[ɒ]	报盗曹高
[iɒ]	飘吊捞妖
[o]	把多罗假
[io]	瘸厦肉加
[uo]	挂花话跨
[aŋ]	碰撑冷生
[iaŋ]	仰央抢粮
[uaŋ]	光梗横
[əŋ]	萌凳乘恒
[ɪŋ]	民亭津引
[ɒŋ]	胖汤窗抗
[iɒŋ]	亮降像象
[uɒŋ]	黄旺眶往
[oŋ]	红翁东奉
[ioŋ]	琼穷胸咏
[aʔ]	百折客赫
[iaʔ]	掠削约捏
[uaʔ]	豁掴划括
[eʔ]	泼物撒舌
[ueʔ]	凸虱脱捋
[əʔ]	德特刻值
[ɪʔ]	鳖匹叠悉
[oʔ]	博落摸诺
[ioʔ]	局蓄役穴
[uoʔ]	哭获惑国
[ɛ̃]	扮凡碳蓝
[iɛ̃]	鲇年念验
[uɛ̃]	贯甩弯环
[ẽ]	奔门吻参
[iẽ]	棉点甜盐
[ɵ̃]	算半盘满
[jɵ̃]	软悬娟冤
[uɵ̃]	碗缓欢管
[m̩]	姆（~妈
[n̩]	呒（~得去）
[ŋ̍]	午鱼五
[l̩]*	尔而饵儿

*Literary reading only.
