= Tiantai County =

Tiantai 天台县 Tientai
- County
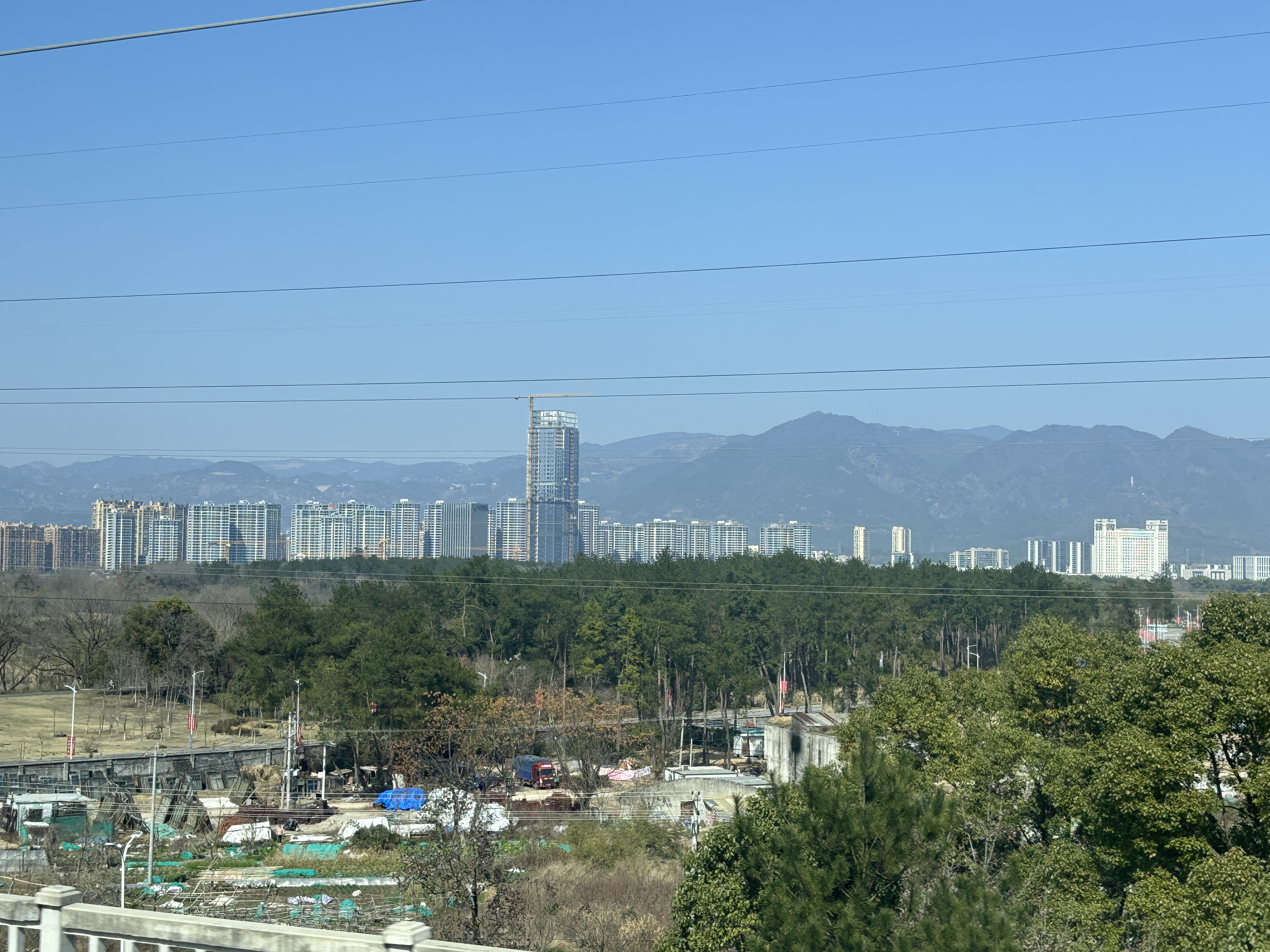
- County seat skyline

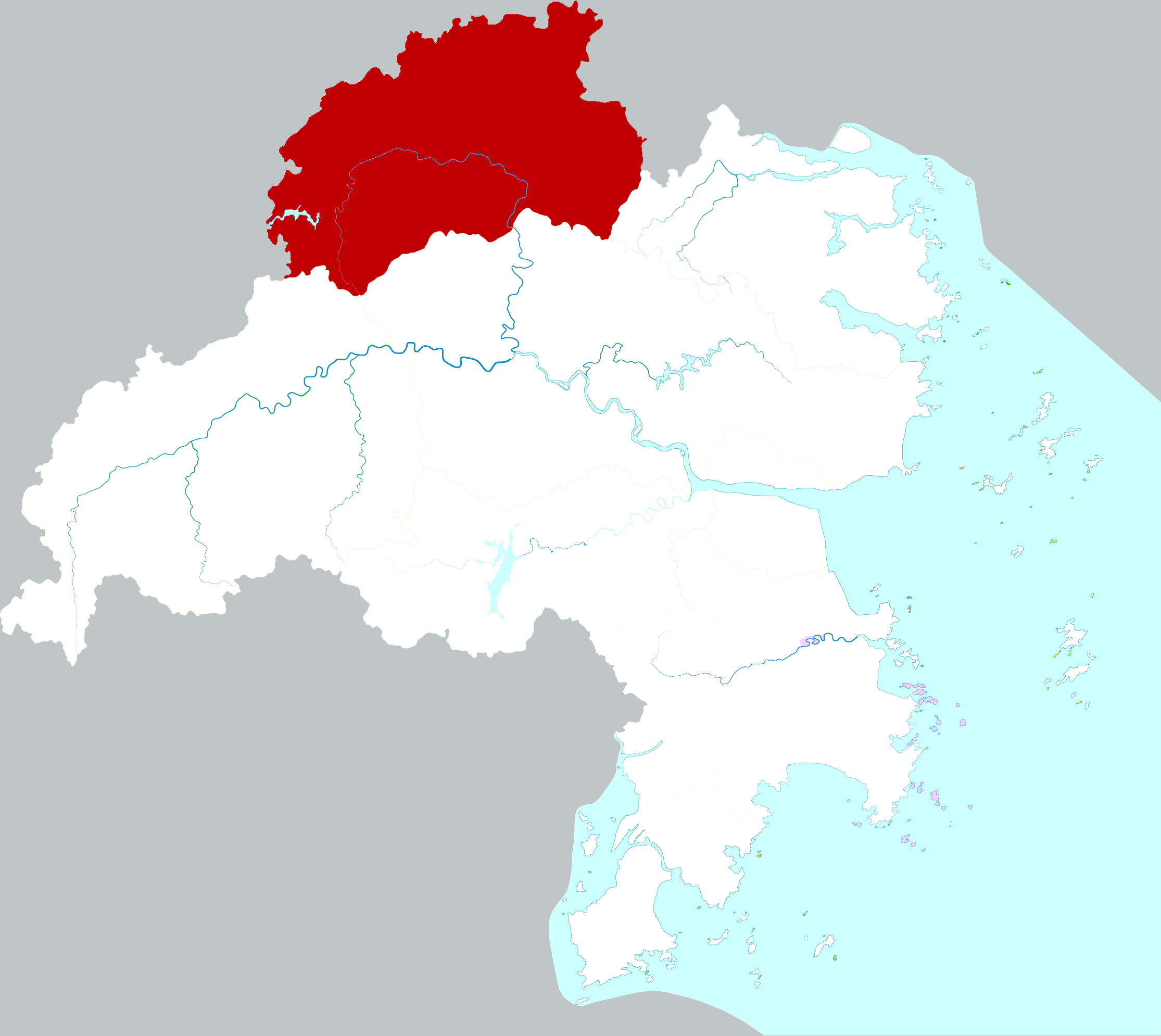
- Location of Tiantai County within Taizhou

- Location of the seat in Zhejiang
- Coordinates: 29°08′39″N 121°00′24″E
- Country: People's Republic of China
- Province: Zhejiang
- Prefecture-level city: Taizhou

Area
  - Total: 1,431.66 km^{2} (552.77 sq mi)

Population (2020)
  - Total: 474,711
  - Density: 331.581/km^{2} (858.790/sq mi)
- Time zone: UTC+8 (China Standard)

Tiantai County (Tai-chow dialect: T'in-t'e yön; simplified Chinese: 天台县; traditional Chinese: 天台縣; pinyin: PRC Standard Mandarin: Tiāntāi Xiàn, ROC Standard Mandarin: Tiāntái Xiàn) is located in Taizhou, Zhejiang, People's Republic of China. Residents mainly speak the Tiantai dialect.

The county is noted for its scenic Mount Tiantai, which is also an important Tiantai Buddhism site. With a total area of 1,432.09 km^{2} (552.93 sq mi) and a population of 560,000, Tiantai is a medium-sized city that administers twelve towns, three districts and 641 villages. Tiantai County's history dates back to the Qin dynasty (221–208 BCE) when it was called Dongyue, later changed to Huipu during the Han dynasty (208 BCE–220 CE).

Tiantai has extensive natural resources including water power, wind power, mines and biological resources. It tops other cities within the province with a total 51,600 kW water power output and is listed in the first batch of model cities of electrification nationwide. A milestone project, Tongbai Pumped Storage Power Station was completed in 2008. The investment is estimated at up to 4.2 billion RMB. Tiantai's metal resources include silver, lead, zinc, tungsten and aluminum.

The private sector constitutes the largest part of the local economy. There are six mainstay industries including rubber & plastics, industrial fabrics, art works, pharmaceuticals, machinery and brewing. In 2003, Tiantai's GDP was 4.7 billion RMB with tax revenues of 560 million RMB.

== Administrative divisions ==
Subdistricts:

- Chicheng Subdistrict (赤城街道), Shifeng Subdistrict (始丰街道), Fuxi Subdistrict (福溪街道)

Towns:

- Baihe (白鹤镇), Shiliang (石梁镇), Jietou (街头镇), Pingqiao (平桥镇), Tantou (坦头镇), Sanhe (三合镇), Hongchou (洪畴镇)

Townships:

- Sanzhou Township (三州乡), Longxi Township (龙溪乡), Leifeng Township (雷峰乡), Nanping Township (南屏乡), Yongxi Township (泳溪乡)

== Climate ==
Climate data for Tiantai, elevation 108 m (354 ft), (1991–2020 normals, extremes 1981–present)
Month	Jan	Feb	Mar	Apr	May	Jun	Jul	Aug	Sep	Oct	Nov	Dec	Year
Record high °C (°F)	25.8 (78.4)	29.7 (85.5)	33.7 (92.7)	35.2 (95.4)	37.3 (99.1)	38.6 (101.5)	41.9 (107.4)	40.6 (105.1)	39.2 (102.6)	36.5 (97.7)	31.0 (87.8)	26.5 (79.7)	41.9 (107.4)
Mean daily maximum °C (°F)	10.5 (50.9)	13.0 (55.4)	16.9 (62.4)	22.8 (73.0)	27.0 (80.6)	29.4 (84.9)	34.0 (93.2)	33.2 (91.8)	29.1 (84.4)	24.6 (76.3)	19.2 (66.6)	13.2 (55.8)	22.7 (72.9)
Daily mean °C (°F)	5.8 (42.4)	7.7 (45.9)	11.4 (52.5)	16.8 (62.2)	21.6 (70.9)	24.8 (76.6)	28.6 (83.5)	28.0 (82.4)	24.2 (75.6)	18.9 (66.0)	13.6 (56.5)	7.7 (45.9)	17.4 (63.4)
Mean daily minimum °C (°F)	2.1 (35.8)	3.8 (38.8)	7.1 (44.8)	12.1 (53.8)	17.2 (63.0)	21.3 (70.3)	24.5 (76.1)	24.4 (75.9)	20.5 (68.9)	14.5 (58.1)	9.2 (48.6)	3.6 (38.5)	13.4 (56.1)
Record low °C (°F)	−8.1 (17.4)	−5.9 (21.4)	−5.5 (22.1)	−0.9 (30.4)	7.2 (45.0)	12.0 (53.6)	17.1 (62.8)	18.4 (65.1)	10.8 (51.4)	1.7 (35.1)	−2.7 (27.1)	−7.4 (18.7)	−8.1 (17.4)
Average precipitation mm (inches)	63.4 (2.50)	63.8 (2.51)	119.3 (4.70)	119.5 (4.70)	141.1 (5.56)	239.0 (9.41)	157.8 (6.21)	228.6 (9.00)	151.2 (5.95)	60.2 (2.37)	62.4 (2.46)	50.1 (1.97)	1,456.4 (57.34)
Average precipitation days (≥ 0.1 mm)	11.7	11.7	15.8	14.4	14.7	17.9	13.7	15.5	12.2	7.0	9.7	9.4	153.7
Average snowy days	3.2	2.0	0.7	0	0	0	0	0	0	0	0.1	1.1	7.1
Average relative humidity (%)	74	74	75	73	76	82	78	79	80	77	77	74	77
Mean monthly sunshine hours	105.5	106.0	120.2	143.2	150.0	121.9	218.6	204.8	152.5	156.9	120.1	123.5	1,723.2
Percentage possible sunshine	32	33	32	37	36	29	51	51	42	45	38	39	39
Source: China Meteorological Administration All-time October highall-time extreme temperature

== See also ==
- The Taizhou Museum displays a section named "Tiantai County".
