= Tiantai dialect =

Wu dialect spoken in Taizhou, China

Tiantai Dialect
- 天台話 / 天台话
- Pronunciation: Tiantai Dialect: [tʰi.tʰai.u]
- Native to: China
- Region: Tiantai County, Taizhou, Zhejiang
- Language family: Sino-Tibetan: Chinese; Wu; Taizhou Wu; Taizhou; Tiantai Dialect

Language codes
- ISO 639-3: –

The Tiantai dialect, also known as Tiantaihua (simplified Chinese: 天台话; traditional Chinese: 天台話; pinyin: Tiāntāihuà; Tiantai dialect pronunciation: [tʰi.tʰai.u]) is a regiolect of Wu Chinese in the Taizhou Wu dialect group. It is spoken in Tiantai County, Taizhou, Zhejiang province, China.

Like other dialects in the Wu family, Tiantaihua has a three-way contrast between voiced, unaspirated voiceless, and aspirated initial consonants (e.g., /t tʰ d/), preserving an earlier feature of Chinese which Mandarin has collapsed into a two-way distinction.

Tiantai dialect
- Traditional Chinese: 天台話
- Simplified Chinese: 天台话
Transcriptions
Standard Mandarin
- Hanyu Pinyin: Tiāntāi Huà
- IPA: [tʰjɛ́n.tʰáɪ.xwâ]
Yue: Cantonese
- Jyutping: Tin1 Toi4 waa2
- IPA: [tʰin˥.tʰɔj˩.wa˧˥]

The Tiantai dialect is the main representative of the northern Taizhou dialect family.

== Comparison with Standard Chinese ==
The meaning of many common words and phrases in the Tiantai dialect differs from that of Standard Chinese. Below is a list of common differences:

Difference of meaning of words
Chinese word	Original meaning	Meaning in the Tiantai dialect	References
味道	Taste	Comfort, enjoyment	
老實好	Honestly good	Praise, very good	
煞夾	Tightly squeezed	Very powerful	
老官	Veteran official	Husband	
天亮	Sunrise, dawn	Tomorrow	
拔好	Properly pulled	Immediately	
活動	Activity	Smart, intelligent	
壽	Longevity	Silliness, lack of empathy	
賴	Sloppy	Bad behaviour	
大慧	Very intelligent	Able person	
大吹	Big blow	Stupid person	

Proverbs and phrases in the Tiantai dialect can be shorter in comparison with the corresponding phrase in Standard Chinese. For example, the phrase "露出馬腳" (literally "exposing the cloven hoof", metaphorically "exposed") is shortened to the phrase "出腳", literally meaning "taking the foot out".

Sentences can be shorter as well; see the example below.

Original	Chinese		和	小王	比起來	，	還是	小李		高	。
Original	English	Literal	As	John	compared to	,	it's still	Terry		taller	.
Original	English	Rearranged	As	compared to John		,	it's still	Terry	(who is)	taller	.
Contracted	English	Literal	~~As compared to~~ John			,	it's ~~still~~	Terry	~~who is~~	taller	.
Contracted	Chinese			小王			是	小李		長	。

== Pronouns ==
Pronouns in the Tiantai dialect
Person	Regular Chinese pronoun	English equivalent	Tiantai dialect pronoun(s)
1st person singular	我	I	我
2nd person singular	你	you (singular)	爾 (Note: The word "爾" stands for "you" in middle Chinese.)
3rd person singular	他	he	佢／渠 (Note: These words are thought to have come from the word "其", a 3rd person pronoun in Middle Chinese.)
3rd person singular	她	she	佢／渠
3rd person singular	牠	it (animals)	佢／渠
3rd person singular	它	it (objects)	佢／渠
1st person plural	我們	we	我等／我拉／我拉個／項等
2nd person plural	你們	you (plural)	爾拉／爾拉個
3rd person plural	他們	they	佢拉／佢拉個／渠拉／渠拉個
3rd person plural	她們	they	佢拉／佢拉個／渠拉／渠拉個
3rd person plural	牠們	they	佢拉／佢拉個／渠拉／渠拉個
3rd person plural	它們	they	佢拉／佢拉個／渠拉／渠拉個

== Syllable structure ==
=== Initials ===
Table of consonants ^{(translated from}^{)}
Consonant	Voiceless unaspirated plosive		Voiceless aspirated plosive		Plosive voiced		Voiceless fricative		Voiced fricative		Glottalised? half voiced		Half voiced	
Consonant	Consonant	Example	Consonant	Example	Consonant	Example	Consonant	Example	Consonant	Example	Consonant	Example	Consonant	Example
Labial	p	幫	ph	滂	b	平	f 敷	敷	v	奉	'm	媽	m	明
Dental	ts	知	tsh	初	dz	迟	s 生	生	z	是	'l	拉	l	來
Coronal	t	端	th	透	d	定					'n	奶	n	南
Alveolo-palatal	c	照	ch	穿	j	澄	sh	心	zh	從				
Velar	k	見	kh	溪	g	群					'ng	嗯	ng	牙
Glottal	'	影					h	曉	gh	匣			y	移
Glottal	'	影					h	曉	gh	匣			w	胡

=== Finals ===
Table of vowels ^{(translated from}^{)}
See also: Four hu
Open mouth		Closed mouth		Even teeth		Round mouth	
Vowel	Example	Vowel	Example	Vowel	Example	Vowel	Example
y	資						
				i	衣		
		u	烏			iu	雨
a	矮	ua	歪	ia	野		
e	哀	ue	威	i.e.	煙		
o	掗	uo	花				
ae	晏	uae	彎				
oe	半	uoe	碗			ioe	遠
au	奧			iau	要		
eu	歐			ieu	悠		
ou	哥						
an	杏	uan	橫	ian	央		
aon	項	uaon	汪			iaon	雙
en	恩	uen	溫				
				in	音	iuin	雲
on	翁					ion	用
aeh	鴨	uaeh	挖				
ah	百	uah	摑	iah	腳		
aoh	惡	uaoh	鑊			iaoh	捉
eh	黑			ieh	葉		
				ih	一	iuih	出
oeh	脫	uoeh	骨			ioeh	月
oh	屋					ioh	郁
		m	無_{白}	n	爾_{白}	ng	五

=== Tones ===
There are 8 tones in the Tiantai dialect, which are obtained by splitting each of the four tones in Mandarin to yin (陰) and yang (陽).

Tones in Tiantai dialect
Tone name	Tone letters
yin ping (陰平)	˧˧ (33)
yang ping (陽平)	˨˦ (24)
yin shang (陰上)	˧˨˥ (325)
yang shang (陽上)	˨˩˦ (214)
yin qu (陰去)	˥˥ (55)
yang qu (陽去)	˧˥ (35)
yin ru (陰入)	˥ʔ (5)
yang ru (陽入)	˨˧ʔ (23)
