= Yongkang dialect =

Wu dialect of Yongkang, China

- 永康话/永康話
- Native to: People's Republic of China
- Region: Yongkang, Zhejiang Province
- Language family: Sino-Tibetan: Sinitic; Chinese; Wu; Wuzhou Wu; Yongkang dialect

Language codes
- ISO 639-3: –

The Yongkang dialect (simplified Chinese: 永康话; traditional Chinese: 永康話) is a Wu Chinese dialect. It is spoken in the city of Yongkang in Zhejiang province. The Yongkang dialect can roughly be divided into accents, commonly known as Shangjiaoqiang (上角腔) and Xiajiaoqiang (下角腔), spoken in northeastern Yongkang and south Yongkang respectively.

== Phonology ==
=== Initials ===
The Yongkang dialect has 35 initials, including the zero-initial consonant.

			Labial	Alveolar	Alveolo-Palatal	Palatal	Velar	Glottal
Nasal			m 莫	n 納	ɲ̟ 尼		ŋ 呆	
Plosive	voiceless	tenuis	p 剝	t 德		c 糾	k 該	ʔ (Note: Zero initials sometimes have a slight glottal stop, but they are considered to still be zero initial phonemes)
Plosive	voiceless	aspirated	pʰ 撲	tʰ 脫		cʰ 丘	kʰ 開	ʔ
Plosive	voiced		b 薄	d 特		ɟ 奇	ɡ 葵	
Affricate	voiceless	tenuis		ʦ 資	ʨ 支			
Affricate	voiceless	aspirated		ʦʰ 雌	ʨʰ 癡			
Affricate	voiced			ʣ 直	ʥ 池			
Fricative	voiceless		f 福	s 私	ɕ 施	ç 希		h 海
Fricative	voiced		v 服	z 慈	ʑ 時			ɦ 孩
Approximant		plain				j 野		
Approximant		labial				ɥ 圓		
Lateral				l 肋				

=== Finals ===
The Yongkang dialect has 39 rimes.

Vowel nuclei
	Front		Central	Back	
	Unrounded	Rounded	Central	Unrounded	Rounded
Close	i 衣	y 迂		ɯ (colloquial) 鋸	u 烏
Mid			ə 北		
Open	a 晏				

Finals
Medial	Rime															
Medial	∅	a	ɑ	o	ᴇ	ə	ɯ	ɯɤ	ai	ei	əi	au	əu	aŋ	əŋ	oŋ
∅	ɿ 資	a 晏				ə 北	ɯ (colloquial) 鋸	ɯɤ 安	ai 壓	ei 哀	aŋ 骯	əŋ 恩	oŋ 翁		au 襖	əu 歐
i	i 衣	ia 挨	ĭᴀ 也		iᴇ 煙		ĭɜ 益					iau 妖	iəu 優	iaŋ 央	iəŋ 英	
u	u 烏	ŭa 碗	uɑ 鴨	uo 倭		ŭʌ 滑			uai 歪		uəi 威			uaŋ 汪	uəŋ 溫	
y	y 迂	ya 閱		yo 鬱	yᴇ 怨	y̆ɜ 役								yaŋ 裝	yəŋ 永	yoŋ 癰

The Yongkang dialect also has /ŋ̍/ (as in 兒) in colloquial speech.

=== Tones ===
The Yongkang dialect has 6 tones.

Monosyllable tones
	Middle Chinese tone		
	píng 平	shǎng 上	qù 去
yīn 阴	˦˦ (44)	˧˧˥ (35)	˥˧ (52)
yáng 阳	˨˨ (22)	˩˨˧ (13)	˨˦/˨˦˩ (24/241)

The checked tone of Middle Chinese has disappeared in the Yongkang dialect.

The Yongkang dialect uses tone sandhi to form diminutives.

Diminutive tone sandhi
	Middle Chinese tone		
	píng 平	shǎng 上	qù 去
yīn 阴	˧˨˦ (324)	˥˧ (53)	˧˧ (33)
yáng 阳	˧˨˦ (324)	˨˦ (24)	˩˩ (11)

== Bibliography ==
- Yongkang County Annals Compilation Committee (1991). Yongkang County Annals. Zhejiang People's Publishing House. pp. 673–674. ISBN 721300638X.
- Yuan, Jianhua (2001). An Outline of Chinese Dialects. p. 78. ISBN 7801264746.
- Fu, Guotong (2010). Dialect Collection. Beijing: Zhonghua Book Company. ISBN 9787101068962.
