= Cao Zhiyun =

Chinese linguist and dialectologist

Cao Zhiyun (Chinese: 曹志耘; pinyin: Cáo Zhìyún), born in Jinhua, Zhejiang in 1961, is a Chinese linguist and dialectologist who is a professor at Beijing Language and Culture University.

== Career ==
He is best known for his work as the primary editor of the groundbreaking 2008 Linguistic Atlas of Chinese Dialects but has made numerous other significant contributions to Chinese dialectology, with a focus on the Southern Wu varieties in and around his native Jinhua. Despite his focus, his works exhibit an all around thorough and in-depth understanding of all Chinese dialect families and contemporary linguistics and is widely regarded in the field as one of China's leading authorities on Chinese dialectology.

== See also ==
- Wu Chinese
- Dialectology
