= Sanhe, Zhejiang =

Sanhe 三合镇
- Town
- Location in Zhejiang
- Coordinates: 29.0798°N 121.1722°E
- Country: People's Republic of China
- Province: Zhejiang
- Prefecture-level city: Taizhou
- County: Tiantai County
- Time zone: UTC+8 (China Standard)

Sanhe (Chinese: 三合; pinyin: Sānhé) is a town under the administration of Tiantai County, Zhejiang, China. As of 2018, it has 26 villages under its administration.
