= Tongbai Pumped Storage Power Station =

- Country: China
- Location: Tiantai County, Zhejiang Province
- Coordinates: 29°12′10.98″N 120°59′51.77″E
- Status: Operational
- Construction began: 2000
- Opening date: 2005–2006
- Construction cost: US$904.10 million
- Operator(s): Shenergy Company

Upper reservoir
- Creates: Tongbai Upper
- Total capacity: 12,316,000 m^{3} (9,985 acre⋅ft)

Lower reservoir
- Creates: Tongbai Lower
- Total capacity: 12,897,000 m^{3} (10,456 acre⋅ft)

Power Station
- Hydraulic head: 239 m (784 ft)
- Pump-generators: 4 x 300 MW (400,000 hp) Francis pump turbines
- Installed capacity: 1,200 MW (1,600,000 hp)
- Annual generation: 2.8 billion kWh

The Tongbai Pumped Storage Power Station is a pumped-storage hydroelectric power station located 6 kilometres (3.7 mi) north of Tiantai city in Tiantai County of Zhejiang Province, China. Construction on the power station began in May 2000 and the first unit was commissioned in December 2005. The remaining three were operational by December 2006. The entire project cost US$904.10 million, of which US$320 million was provided by the World Bank. The power station operates by shifting water between an upper and lower reservoir to generate electricity. The lower reservoir was formed with the creation of the Tongbai Lower Dam on the Baizhang River. The Tongbai Upper Reservoir, which already existed before construction began, is in an adjacent valley above the east side of the lower reservoir on Tongbai Creek. During periods of low energy demand, such as at night, water is pumped from Tongbai Lower Reservoir up to the upper reservoir. When energy demand is high, the water is released back down to the lower reservoir but the pump turbines that pumped the water up now reverse mode and serve as generators to produce electricity. The process is repeated as necessary and the plant serves as a peaking power plant. The power station is operated by Shenergy Company.

The lower reservoir is created by a 68-metre (223 ft) tall and 420-metre (1,380 ft) long concrete-face rock-fill dam on the Baizhang River. It can hold up to 12,897,000 cubic metres (10,456 acre⋅ft) of water of which 967,860 cubic metres (784.66 acre⋅ft) can be used for power generation. The upper reservoir is created by a 37-metre (121 ft) tall and 456-metre (1,496 ft) long rock-fill dam on Tonbai Creek. It can hold up to 12,316,000 cubic metres (9,985 acre⋅ft) of water of which 10,627,000 cubic metres (8,615 acre⋅ft) can be used for power generation. Water from the upper reservoir is sent to the 1,200 MW underground power station near the lower reservoir through headrace/penstock pipes. The drop in elevation between the upper and lower reservoir affords a hydraulic head (water drop) of 239 metres (784 ft).

== See also ==
- List of pumped-storage power stations
