= Jinhua dialect =

Wu Chinese dialect of Jinhua, China

- 金华话 金華話
- Pronunciation: [tɕiŋ˧uɑ˥uɑ˩˦]
- Region: Jindong District and the east of Wucheng District, Jinhua; Zhejiang
- Ethnicity: Han, She
- Native speakers: 730,000 (2016)
- Language family: Sino-Tibetan: Sinitic; Wu; Wuzhou; Jinhua dialect

Language codes
- ISO 639-1: zh
- ISO 639-2: chi (B) zho (T)
- ISO 639-3: wuu
- ISO 639-6: jiua
- Glottolog: jinh1238

The Jinhua dialect (Chinese: 金华话/金華話; pinyin: Jīnhuáhuà, Urban-Centre Jinhua dialect IPA: /tɕiŋ^{334-33} uɑ^{313-45} uɑ^{14}/) is a dialect of Wu Chinese spoken in the city of Jinhua, China and the surrounding region in central Zhejiang province. With its largest community of speakers in the eastern Wucheng and Jindong districts of the city, the Jinhua dialect branch has been classified as part of the Wuzhou subfamily of Wu, or as part of the proposed Jinqu subfamily of Wu.
