= Wuzhou Wu =

Southern Wu Chinese language of Zhejiang, China

- Native to: People's Republic of China
- Region: Zhejiang
- Native speakers: (4 million cited 1987)
- Language family: Sino-Tibetan: Sinitic; Wu; Wuzhou Wu

Language codes
- ISO 639-3: None (mis)
- ISO 639-6: wzou
- Glottolog: wuzh1238
- Linguasphere: 79-AAA-df

Wuzhou Wu (婺州話 or 務州片) is a Southern Wu Chinese language spoken in and around Jinhua in Zhejiang province. It is at best only poorly intelligible with Taihu Wu. Wuzhou Wu is named after the ancient Wuzhou County that existed in modern-day Jinhua.

== Dialects ==
Jinhua is the chief and representative dialect of Wuzhou.

- Dongyang dialect
- Jiande dialect
- Jinhua dialect
- Lanxi dialect
- Niutou-Shan dialect
- Pan'an dialect
- Pujiang dialect
- Wuyi dialect
- Yiwu dialect
- Yongkang dialect
