= Taizhou Wu =

Southern Wu Chinese language of Zhejiang, China

- Native to: People's Republic of China
- Region: Zhejiang
- Speakers: 6.25 million (2012)
- Language family: Sino-Tibetan: Sinitic; Chinese; Wu; Taizhou Wu

Language codes
- ISO 639-3: None (mis)
- ISO 639-6: tihu
- Glottolog: taiz1238
- Linguasphere: 79-AAA-dg (incl. 79-AAA-dgi Taizhou "proper")

The Taizhou Wu (台州片) is a Southern Wu Chinese language spoken in and around Taizhou in Zhejiang province. It is to some extent mutually intelligible with Taihu Wu.

== Dialects ==
Taizhou proper is the chief and representative dialect.

- Taizhou dialect
- Linhai dialect
- Sanmen dialect
- Tiantai dialect
- Xianju dialect
- Huangyan dialect (黃巖話/黄岩话 [wɔ̤ɲjɛ̤̃wa̤])
- Jiaojiang dialect
- Wenling dialect
- Yuhuan dialect
- Yueqing dialect
- Ninghai dialect
