= Wu Chinese =

Chinese varieties spoken at and south of the Yangtze delta

Wu
- 吴语; 吳語
- Region: Shanghai, Zhejiang, southern Jiangsu, parts of Anhui and Jiangxi; overseas and migrant communities
- Ethnicity: Wu
- Native speakers: 83 million (2021)
- Language family: Sino-Tibetan: Sinitic; Chinese; Wu
- Dialects: Varieties
- Writing system: Chinese characters (Latin script)

Language codes
- ISO 639-3: wuu
- Glottolog: wuch1236
- Linguasphere: 79-AAA-d
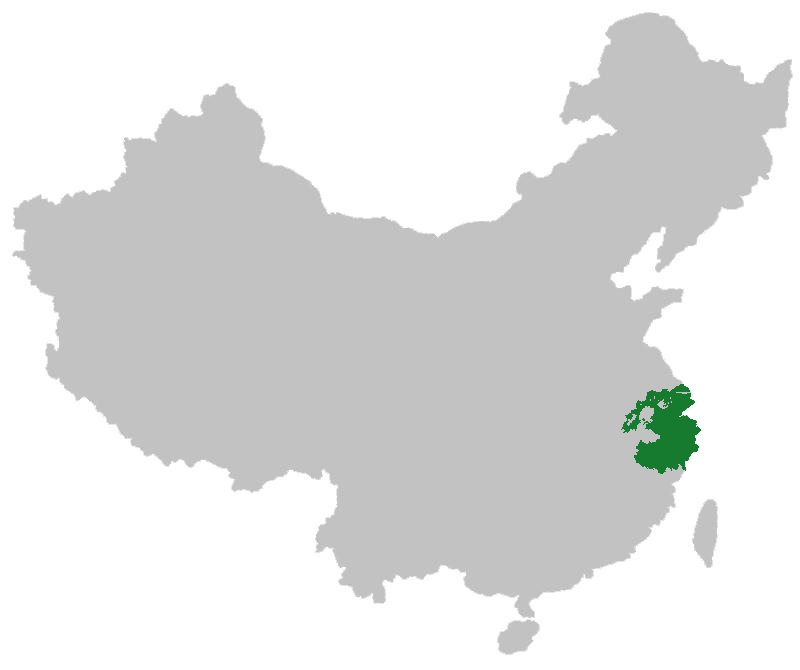

Wu (Note: simplified Chinese: 吴语; traditional Chinese: 吳語; pinyin: Wúyǔ; Wugniu and IPA:^{6}wu-gniu_{6} [ɦu˩.nʲy˦] (Shanghainese), ^{2}ghou-gniu_{6} [ɦou˨.nʲy˧] (Suzhounese)) is a major group of Chinese languages spoken primarily in Shanghai, Zhejiang province, and parts of Jiangsu province, especially south of the Yangtze River, which make up the Wu cultural region. The Wu languages are at times simply called Shanghainese, especially when introduced to foreigners. The Suzhounese variety was the prestige dialect of Wu as of the 19th century but had been replaced in status by Shanghainese by the turn of the 20th century, which coincided with a period of rapid language change in the city. The languages of Northern Wu constitute a language family and are mutually intelligible, while those of Southern Wu do not form a phylogenetic language family and are not mutually intelligible.

Historical linguists consider Wu interesting because of its distinct nature. The Wu languages typically preserve all voiced initials of medieval Chinese, as well as the checked tone in the form of a glottal stop. Wu varieties also have morphological and syntactic innovations, as well as vocabulary only found in the Wu grouping. It is also of note that the influential linguist Chao Yuen Ren was a native speaker of Changzhounese, a variety of Northern Wu. The Wu varieties, especially that of Suzhou, are traditionally perceived as soft in the ears of speakers of both Wu and non-Wu languages, leading to the idiom "the tender speech of Wu" (吴侬软语; 吳儂軟語).

== Names ==
Wu Chinese
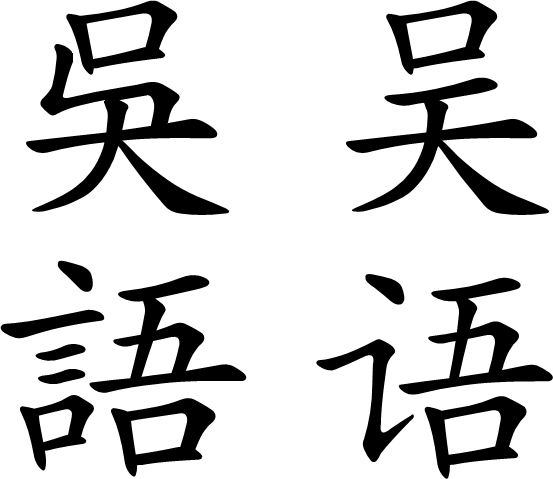
- "Wu Chinese" in Traditional (left) and Simplified (right) Chinese characters
- Traditional Chinese: 吳語
- Simplified Chinese: 吴语
- Wugniu: wu^{2} gniu^{4}
Transcriptions
Standard Mandarin
- Hanyu Pinyin: Wúyǔ
- Bopomofo: ㄨˊ ㄩˇ
- Wade–Giles: Wu^{2}-yü^{3}
- IPA: [ǔ.ỳ]
Wu
- Wugniu: wu^{2} gniu^{4}
- IPA: Shanghainese: [ɦu˨ ȵy˦] Suzhounese: [ɦəu˨ ȵy˧]
Yue: Cantonese
- Yale Romanization: ǹgh yúh
- Jyutping: ng^{4} jyu^{5}
- IPA: [ŋ.jy˩˧]
Southern Min
- Hokkien POJ: ngô͘-gú

Most speakers of Wu varieties do not readily identify with or are entirely unaware of the term for their speech, since the classificatory imposition of "Wu" used in linguistics today is a relatively recent coinage. Saying someone "speaks Wu" is therefore akin to saying someone "speaks a Romance language". It is not a particularly defined entity, unlike Standard Mandarin or Standard German.

Most speakers are aware of their local variety's affinities only with other similarly-classified varieties. They generally refer only to their local Wu variety, rather than to the dialect family as a whole. That is done typically by affixing 話 ('speech') to a location's endonym. For example, 溫州話 (Wu Chinese pronunciation: [ʔy˧꜖ tɕiɤu˧꜖ ɦo˩꜒꜔]) is used for Wenzhounese. Affixing 閒話 is also common, and more typical of Northern Wu, as in 嘉興閒話 (Wugniu: ka-shin ghae-o) for the Jiaxing variety. Names for the group as a whole include:

- Wu language (吴语; 吳語; Wúyǔ; Shanghainese [ɦu˨ ɲy˦]; Suzhounese [ɦoʊ˨ ɲy˦]; Wuxinese [ŋ˨˨˧ nʲy˨]; 'Wu language'), the formal name and standard reference in dialectology literature.
- Wu topolect (吴方言; 吳方言; Wú fāngyán), a common name that refers to Wu languages that appends 方言 ("dialect, topolect") instead of 語 ("language"), at times perceived as derogatory.
- Wuyue language (吴越语; 吳越語; Wúyuèyǔ; 'the language of Wu–Yue'), a poetic and historical name, highlighting the roots of the language in antiquity, specifically the culture of the Wu and Yue states during the Warring States period.
  - Goetian, derived from the Japanese spelling of Wuyue (吳越; Go-etsu), is among the alternative names listed by Ethnologue. Derivations of the term 吳越 into English via Japanese is associated with radical separatists, including auntologists.
- Jiang–Zhe speech (江浙话; 江浙話; Jiāngzhè huà), a non-standard name meaning 'the speech of Jiangsu and Zhejiang', occasionally used to highlight the fact that the language is spoken across two provinces.
- Jiangnan speech (江南话; 江南話; Jiāngnán huà), a non-standard, less common name linking the language to the cultural region of Jiangnan. This is not to be confused with the Jiangnan Industrial Groups Koiné spoken in Xiangtan, which is classified as a variety of Mandarin. Contrasts with Jiāngběihuà (江北話), ie. Huai Chinese.

== History ==
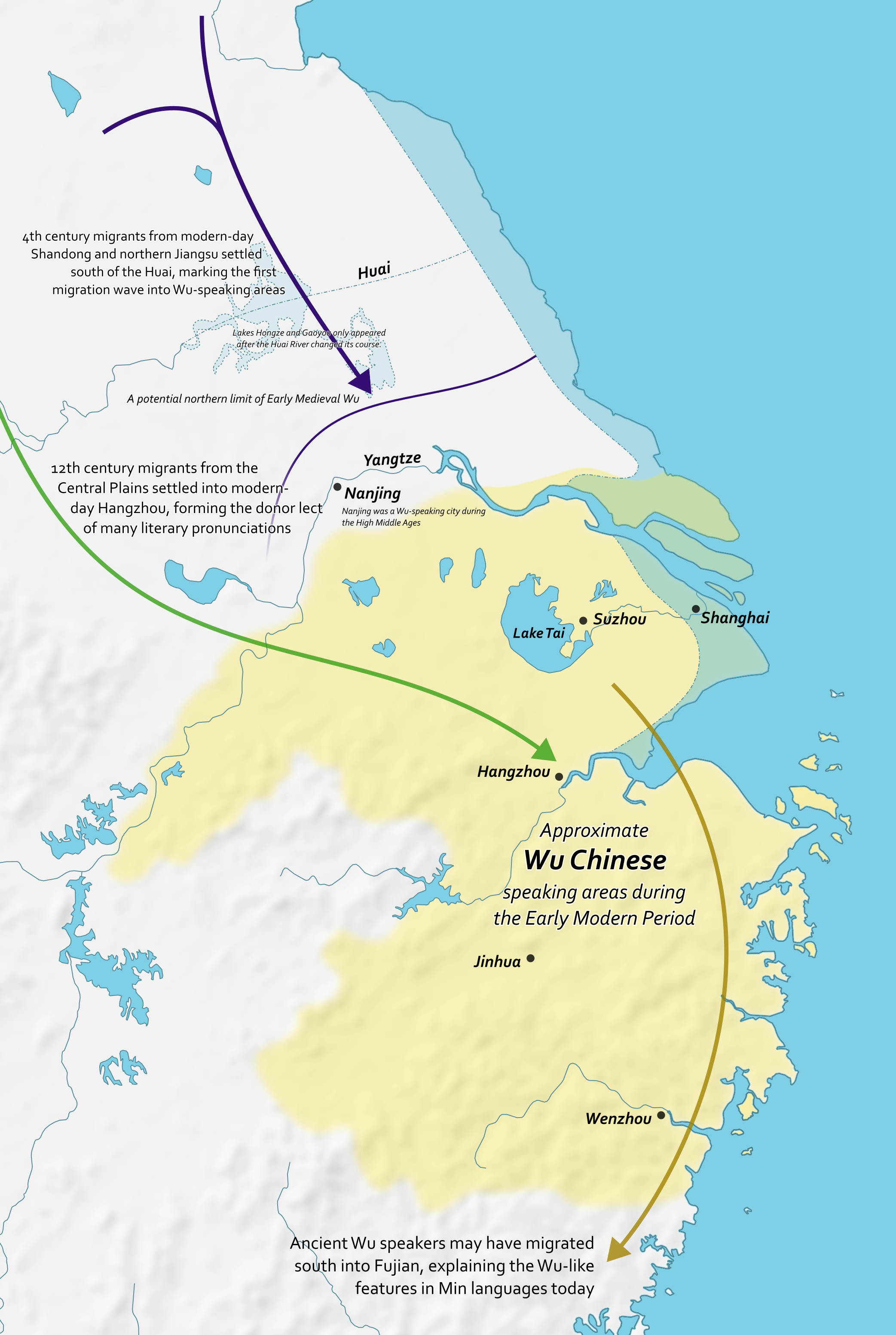
Migratory routes into or out of the early modern limits of Wu Chinese

It is believed that Han Chinese peoples first arrived at the area during pre-dynastic history. After the migrations preceding the Upheaval of the Five Barbarians, the vernacular that would later lead to modern Wu Chinese started taking shape, though the court language of Jiankang (today Nanjing) was still noticeably different to that of the commonfolk. A second migration wave during the Southern Song dynasty, this time to Lin'an (Hangzhou), led to the formation of the modern literary layer, and during the Yuan and Ming dynasties, many operatic traditions and vernacular texts began to appear. Later, during the Qing dynasty, missionaries began translating the Bible into various local varieties and recording the exact pronunciations of many varieties for the first time. During that time, the economic boom of Shanghai also happened, which led to its urban variety becoming the prestige variety over that of Suzhou.

The 20th century marked a pivotal moment of Wu linguistic change, as Standard Mandarin was promoted nation-wide, though the 21st century is seeing revival efforts for many Wu Chinese varieties.

=== Ancient and early dynastic Wu ===
Before the migration of the Han Chinese peoples, the Jiangnan region was inhabited by Kra-Dai or Austroasiatic peoples, which were dubbed barbarians by the early Chinese.

According to traditional history, Taibo of Wu settled in the area during the Shang dynasty, bringing along a large section of the population and Chinese administrative practices to form the state of Wu. The majority population of the state would have been the ancient Baiyue peoples, who had very different customs and practices compared to the Chinese.

It is said in Master Lü's Spring and Autumn Annals that the customs and languages of the states of Wu and Yue were the same. This refers not just to the Baiyue language of the area, but also of that of "Ancient Wu", a Sinitic language that was likely used only by nobility. The northern border of this Ancient Wu language is at the Huai River rather than the Yangtze like it is today, and its southern limits may have reached as far as Fujian, as Proto-Min may have been a daughter language to Ancient Wu, though this is not fully accepted. As early as the time of Guo Pu (275–324), speakers easily perceived differences between dialects in different parts of China, including the area where Ancient Wu was spoken. The language slowly receded from the north due to growing pressure from the Central Plains, until its northern limit was set near the Yangtze River towards the end of the Western Jin dynasty. However, all modern Wu varieties work within the Qieyun system and so Old Chinese dialect cannot be the primary origin of Wu Chinese today.

==== Non-Sinitic strata ====
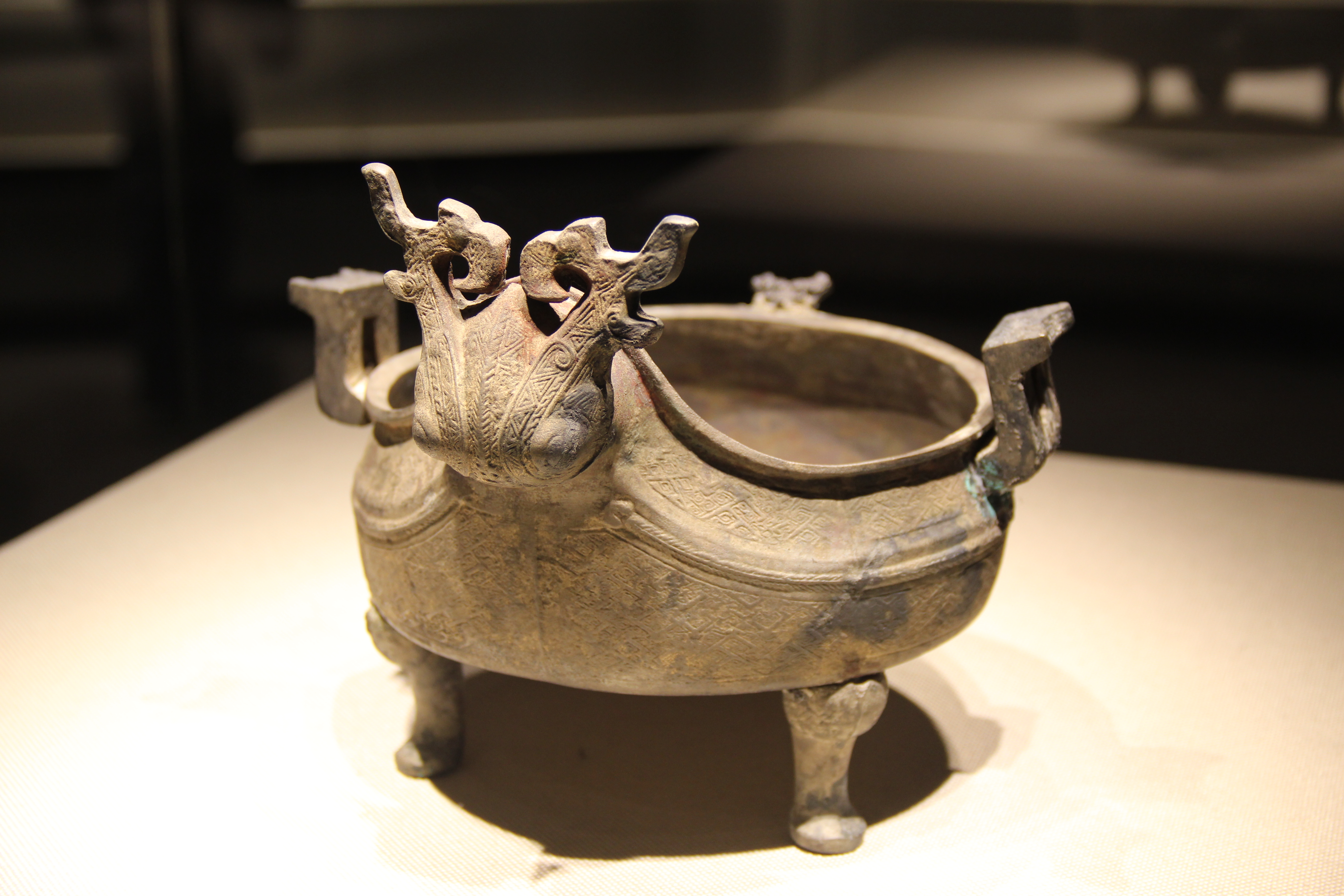
A yi vessel from the Wu yue state

It is known that Wu languages inherited a significant number of loanwords of Kra-Dai origin. A study of the variety spoken in Maqiao, a suburb of Shanghai, found that 126 out of around a thousand lexical items surveyed were of Kra-Dai origin. Terms such as 落蘇 (Wugniu: ^{8}loq-su_{1} "aubergine") are also shared between other Sinitic languages (eg. Teochew, Peng'im: lag^{8} sou^{1}) as well as Kra-Dai languages (cf. Standard Zhuang lwggwz). Shared terms with Austroasiatic languages have also been suggested, though many of them, such as Vietnamese đầm, bèo, and kè, have also been argued to be areal features, Chinese words in disguise, or long shots.

Kra-Dai	Maqiao Wu dialect	Gloss
-m, -n become -ŋ
tam^{33} (Zhuang)	təŋ^{354}	step 跺
fa:n^{31} (Sui)	fəŋ^{55} du^{53}	snore/to snore 鼾
ɕam^{21} (Zhuang)	pəʔ^{33} ɕhaŋ^{435}	to have fun (游) 玩
final consonant/vowel missing
va:n^{31}li^{55} (Zhuang)	ɑ:^{31} li^{33}	still, yet 尚；还
tsai^{55} (Zhuang)	tsɔ:^{435}	to plow 犁(地)
thaŋ^{55} (Dai)	dᴇ^{354}	hole/pit 坑
hai^{21} (Zhuang)	hɑ^{53}	filth 污垢
za:n^{11} (Bouyei)	ɕhy^{55} zᴇ^{53}	building/room 房子
kăi^{13} (Dai)	kᴇ^{435}	to draw close to 靠拢
fɤŋ^{13} (Dai)	fɛ^{435}	to sway/to swing 摆动
ɕa:ŋ^{33} (Bouyei)	ɕhɑ^{55} tsɑ^{53}	capable/competent 能干
tjeu^{44} (Maonan)	thɛ^{435}	to crawl 爬
becoming final glottal stop -ʔ
loŋ^{21} (Zhuang)	lɔʔ^{33}	below/down 下(雨)
kem^{55} (Zhuang)	tɕiʔ^{33} ku^{53}	cheek 腮
kam^{33} (Zhuang)	kheʔ^{55}	to press 按
kau^{33} son^{213} (Lingao)	khəʔ^{55} tɕoŋ^{55}	to doze/to nap 瞌睡
tɯ^{11} (Bouyei)	ʔdəʔ^{55}	end/extremity 端
ka:u^{11} (Bouyei)	kuaʔ^{55}	to split/to crack 裂
peu^{55} (Sui)	pəʔ^{33} ɕaŋ^{435}	to have fun(游)玩

Kra-Dai	Maqiao Wu dialect	Gloss
-m, -n become -ŋ
kam^{11} (Dai)	kaŋ^{354}	to prop up/to brace 撑住
tsam^{13} (Sui)	tshoŋ^{53}	to bow the head 低头
final consonant/vowel missing
ve:n^{55} (Zhuang)	ve:^{55}	to hang/to suspend 悬挂；吊
lɒi^{55} (Dai)	lu^{354}	mountain/hill 山(地名用)
xun—^{55} (Dai) ha:k^{55} (Zhuang)	xɔ^{55} lɔ^{53}	government official/official 官
məu^{53} (Dong)	nɑ^{55} mo^{53}	tadpole 蝌蚪
pai^{21} (Zhuang)	pɛ^{435} fu^{53}	classifier for times 趟；次
la:m^{33} (Zhuang)	lɛ^{435}	to tie up 拴(牛)
tsam^{33} (Sui)	tsɿ^{55}	to bow the head 低头
(ɣa:i^{42}) ɕa:i^{42} (Zhuang)	ɕɑ:^{354}	very, quite, much 很
becoming final glottal stop -ʔ
sa:ŋ^{33} səu^{53} (Dong)	seʔ^{33} zo^{55} ɦɯ^{11}	wizard/magician 巫师
tɕe^{31} (Bouyei)	tɕiʔ^{55} ɕhiŋ^{55}	market/bazaar 集市
pleu^{55} (Zhuang)	pəʔ^{33}	to move 搬
wen^{55} (Dong)	veʔ^{33}	to pour 倒(水)
thăi^{55} (Dai)	theʔ^{55}	to weed 耘
ta^{55} jɯ^{55} (Dai)	teʔ^{55}	to narrow one's eyes 眯
lom^{24} (Zhuang)	lɔʔ^{33} nɒn^{35}	pitfall/to sink 陷
ɣa:i^{42} (ɕa:i^{42}) (Zhuang)	ʔɔʔ^{55}	very/quite/much 很
tom^{13} (Dai)	thoʔ^{55}	to cook/to boil 煮(肉)

Though Sino-Tibetan, Kra-Dai, Austronesian and Austroasiatic are mostly considered to be unrelated to one another, Laurent Sagart has proposed some possible phylogenetic affinities. Specifically, Tai–Kadai and Sino-Tibetan could possibly both belong to the Sino-Austronesian language family (not to be confused with Austroasiatic) because of a scattering of cognates between their ancestral forms, and there is also some, albeit much more tenuous, evidence to suggest that Austroasiatic should also be included. However, his views are but one among competing hypotheses about the phylogeny of these languages, and is not widely accepted. See the Sino-Austronesian languages article for some further detail.

It does appear that Wu varieties have had non-Sinitic influences, and many contain words cognate with those of other languages in various strata. These words however are few and far between, and Wu on the whole is most strongly influenced by other Chinese languages rather than any other linguistic influence.

=== Medieval Wu ===
This period is bookended by two major migration waves into the Wu-speaking area. The first was in the 4th century CE from primarily the mountains of Shandong, whereas the second happened during the 12th century CE, and originated from the Heluo region.

==== Early Medieval ====
Migration routes into southern China during the Upheaval of the Five Barbarians

Events such as the Wu Hu uprising and the Disaster of Yongjia during the Western Jin dynasty, collectively known as the Upheaval of the Five Barbarians, caused the imperial court to move from the Heluo region, along with a large migration wave from the north that lasted 150 years, primarily northern Jiangsu and much of Shandong, entered the Jiangnan region, establishing a new capital at Jiankang, modern-day Nanjing.

Migrants went as far south as central Zhejiang, though many settled in the geographically less challenging areas in the north, that is to say, the Yangtze Delta and the Hangjiahu Plain. Early stages of this period of change was likely marked by diglossia, with the commonfolk typically speaking Ancient Wu or their native Shandong or northern Jiangsu Chinese, and the nobility, both new migrants and old aristocracy, typically speaking a variety not dissimilar to that of early medieval Luoyang. This linguistic situation eventually led to the formation of modern Wu, with many early coincidental strata that are hard to differentiate today. It is unclear as to when exactly the language of the Baiyue became extinct, though during the Eastern Han dynasty, Kra-Dai words were recorded in the everyday vernacular of people in the region, and by the end of the Western Jin, the common language of the region was Sinitic, as will be explained below.

The kentōshi route, the sea route from Japan to China

As early as the Eastern Wu dynasty, commentators criticized the speech of the Southern aristocracy (ie. that of the Wu-speaking areas), noting that it is neither Wu-sounding nor Northern. However, evidence suggests that the primary language among the populace was, in fact, Sinitic, although not one that was perceived as "civilized". This possible civilian language would be a common Jiangdong Sinitic language (古江東方言), as is seen in the Book of Wei, which unflatteringly compares the speech of Jiangdong to the calls of wild animals. The court language of Jiankang at this time would not have been the same as the civilian Wu language, though it would have been closely related. This would also mark the time where Japanese Go-on (呉音; Hepburn: go-on; pinyin: Wúyīn) readings were loaned, and it is accepted that these readings would have been loaned from the language variety of medieval Jiankang.

==== Late Medieval ====
One prominent historical speaker of the medieval Wu language was Emperor Yangdi of the Sui dynasty and his Empress Xiao. Emperor Xuan of Western Liang, a member of Emperor Wu of Liang's court, was Empress Xiao's grandfather and he most likely learned Wu at Jiankang. It is also noted in the preface of the Qieyun, a Sui dynasty rime dictionary, that the speech of Wu, as well as that of Chu, is "at times too soft and light". A "ballad–narrative" (說晿詞話) known as The Story of Xue Rengui Crossing the Sea and Pacifying Liao (薛仁貴跨海征遼故事), which is about the Tang dynasty hero Xue Rengui, is believed to have been written in Suzhounese. After the An Lushan rebellion, significant migration into the northern Wu-speaking areas occurred, which some believe created the north-south geographical divide we see today. Yongjianese, a variety of Oujiang Wu, was first recorded during the Song dynasty. Yongjianese is the variety in which the Liushugu (六書故) by Dai Tong (戴侗, 1200–1285) is written. This treaty of calligraphy was published in 1320.

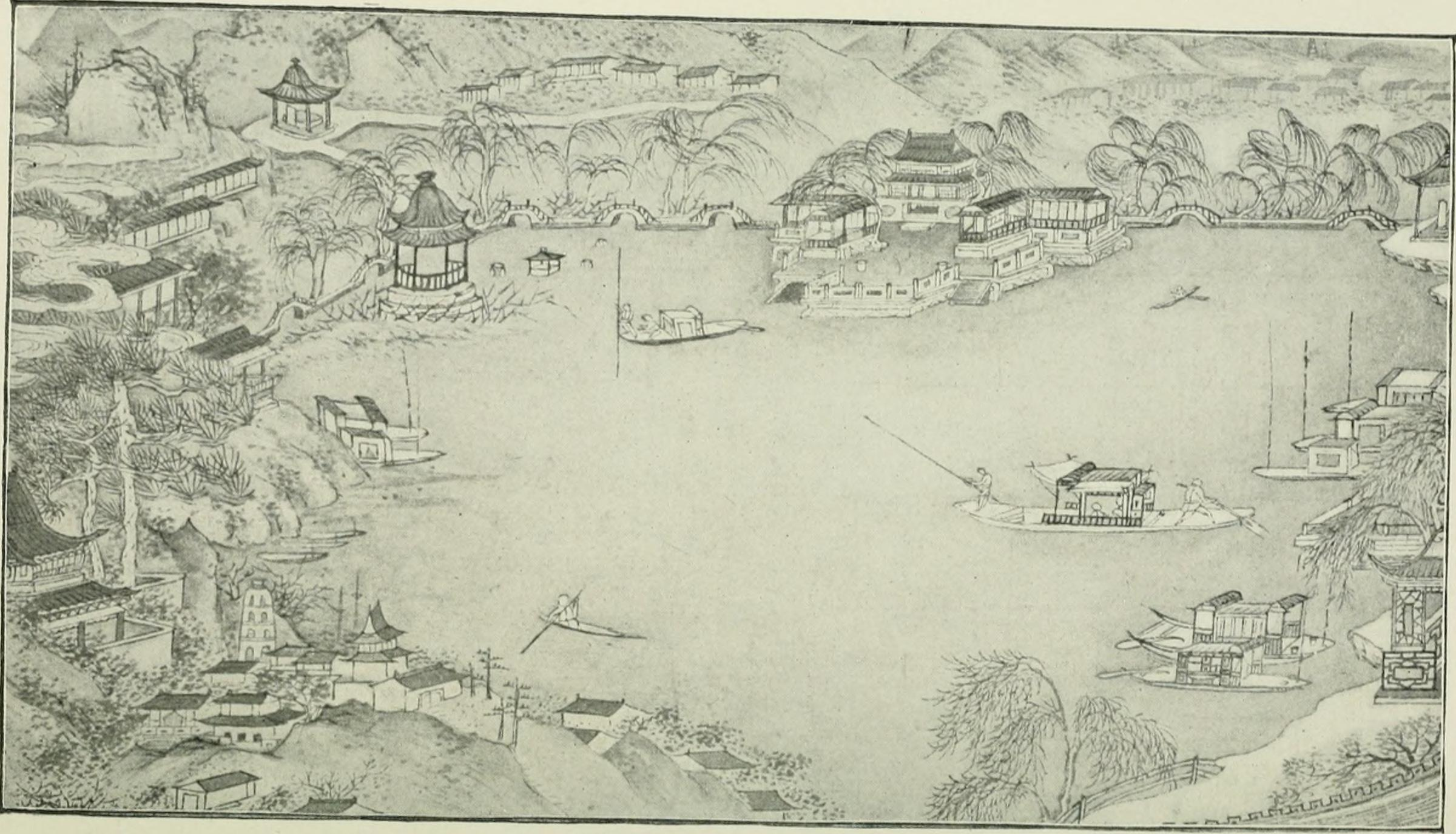
A 19th century illustration of medieval Hangzhou

After the Jingkang incident, the imperial capital of the Song dynasty was moved from Bianjing (modern-day Kaifeng) to Lin'an (Hangzhou), starting the Southern Song period. This also coincided with a large migration wave mostly from the Heluo region, a strip of the Central Plains south of the Yellow River that roughly stretches from Luoyang to Kaifeng, which also brought a language that was not only phonologically and lexically different from the Wu Chinese of the time but also was syntactically and morphologically distinct. The Old Mandarin influence manifested in the form of the modern literary layer, as it was also the court language of the time. Coblin believes that this literary layer is also the origin of Huai Chinese.

=== Late dynastic and post-dynastic Wu ===
Unlike the previous periods, the history of Wu Chinese after the Mongol conquest of China becomes much clearer because of the emergence of vernacular texts.

==== Yuan dynasty ====
After the Mongol conquest of China, a period of relative stability followed, and vernacularism started being further embraced. This is evident in the fact that Chinese opera productions, including those of regions speaking either Northern or Southern Wu, started using their local varieties, rather than Classical Chinese, as had been the norm during and before the Song dynasty.

The Tō-on (唐音; Hepburn: tō-on; Pinyin: Tángyīn) pronunciations introduced during the Japanese Kamakura period were largely rooted in the vernacular of northern Zhejiang at around the end of the Song dynasty or start of the Yuan dynasty, despite what its name may suggest. Analyses on texts of the time reveal stark phonetic differences between the Wu of today and that of the 13th century.

==== Ming dynasty ====
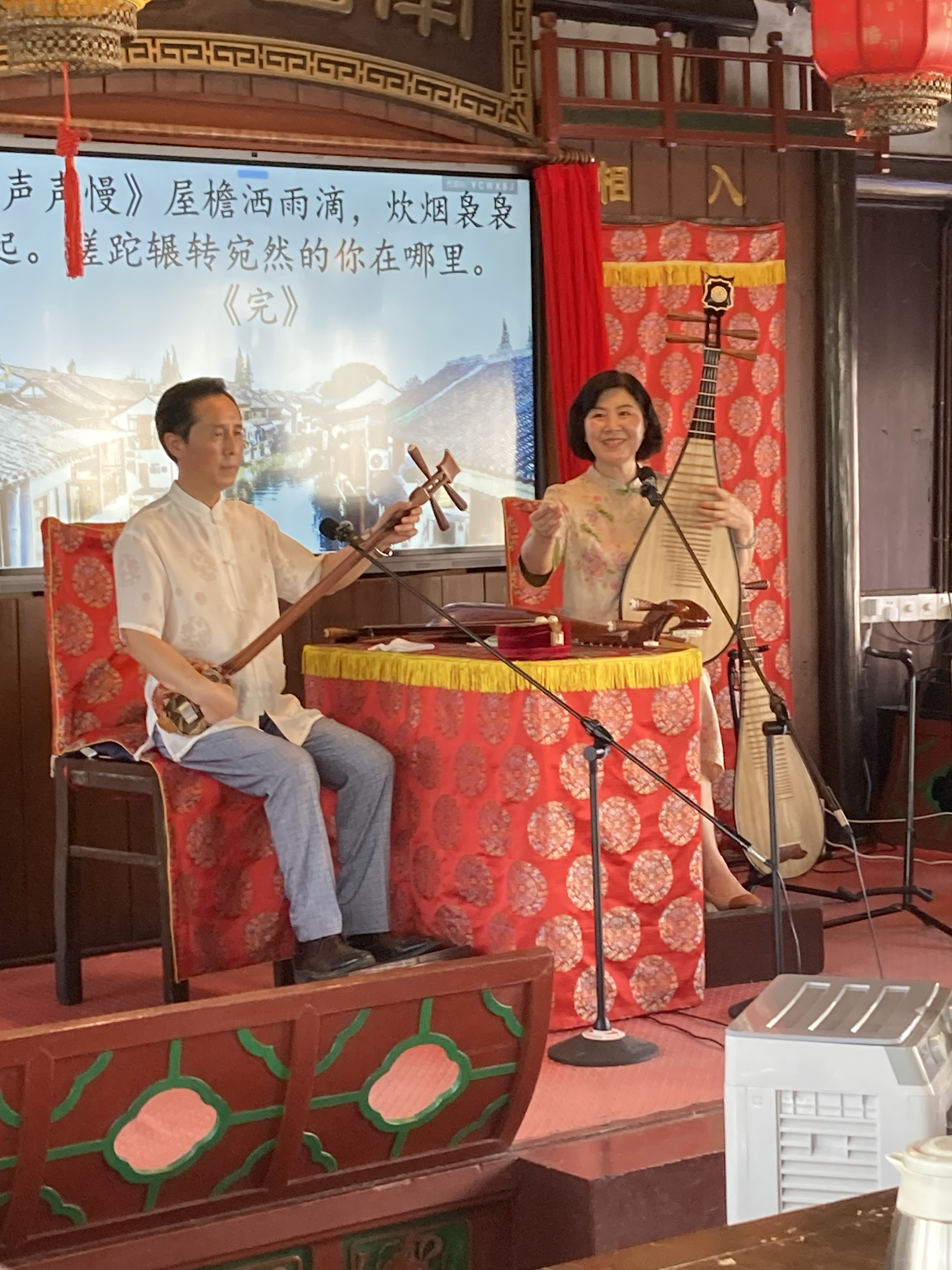
Two performers of Suzhou pingtan

The Ming dynasty saw continued development of local operas, such as Suzhou pingtan, and more vernacular texts being written. In particular, the contemporary Classic Chinese Novels, such as Water Margin, are believed to have significant lexical and syntactic influence from Hangzhounese.

The Yuan-Ming transition saw a tremendous loss of life in the Jianghuai area because of events such as the Red Turban Rebellions. The Hongwu Emperor ordered for people from Jiangnan, primarily in Suzhou, Songjiang, Jiaxing, Hangzhou, and other Northern Wu-speaking areas, to resettle the now depopulated areas in modern central Jiangsu. More migration happened several decades later to avoid wokou pirates. These migrations are believed to have contributed to the Wu-like features in western Huai Chinese groups, such as Tongtai.

Dialectal differences were not as obvious in textual sources until Ming times, and thus regional linguistic distinctions were seen in media only after the fall of the Yuan. These differences are largely found in musical sources such as historical folk songs and tanci (a kind of ballad or lyric poem). For instance, the Shange (山歌; Shāngē; 'Mountain songs'), a collection of folk songs gathered during the Ming dynasty by Feng Menglong in southern Jiangsu and northern Zhejiang, where Northern Wu is today spoken, shows clear signs of modern Wu Chinese in its lexicon. Other Ming documents that are either written in Wu or contain parts where Wu is used include:

- Sanyan (三言), a trilogy of collected stories also compiled by Feng Menglong
- Erpai (二拍), two short story collections by Ling Mengchu
- Xingshiyan (型世言), a novella recorded by Lu Renlong (陸人龍)
- Huanshaji (浣紗記), an opera by Liang Chenyu (梁辰魚)
- Mo Hanzhai Dingben Chuanqi (墨憨齋定本傳奇), by Feng Menglong
- Guzhang Juechen (鼓掌絕塵), a late Ming novel collection
- Bozhonglian (缽中蓮), written by an unknown author

These works contain a small handful of unique grammatical features, some of which are not found in contemporary Mandarin, Classical Chinese, or in contemporary Wu varieties. They do contain many of the unique features in its vocabulary present in contemporary Wu, such as pronouns, but clearly indicate that not all of the earlier unique features of these Wu varieties were carried into present varieties. These works also possess a number of characters uniquely formed to express features not found in the classical language and used some common characters as phonetic loans (see Chinese character classification) to express other uniquely Wu vocabulary.

A 16th-century text called the Wenqiji (问奇集; 問奇集; Wènqíjí) includes a chapter called Gedi Xiangyin (各地鄉音) that records the local pronunciations of terms in various areas. Unlike the Qieyun preface, it separates the early Southwestern Mandarin of Huguang, ie. that of Chu, from Wu Chinese. The chapter records typical features of modern Wu, such as:

- the /ŋ/ coda in the term 打; 'to strike' (打為黨)
- the loss of the final glide in terms such as 解; 'to untie' (解為嫁)
- the apical rime -yu (Wugniu) (豬為知)
- the voicing (potentially even the breathy voice or "murmur" that Northern Wu is famous for) of historically voiced initials (辰為人, 范為萬, etc.)

==== Qing dynasty and Republican China ====
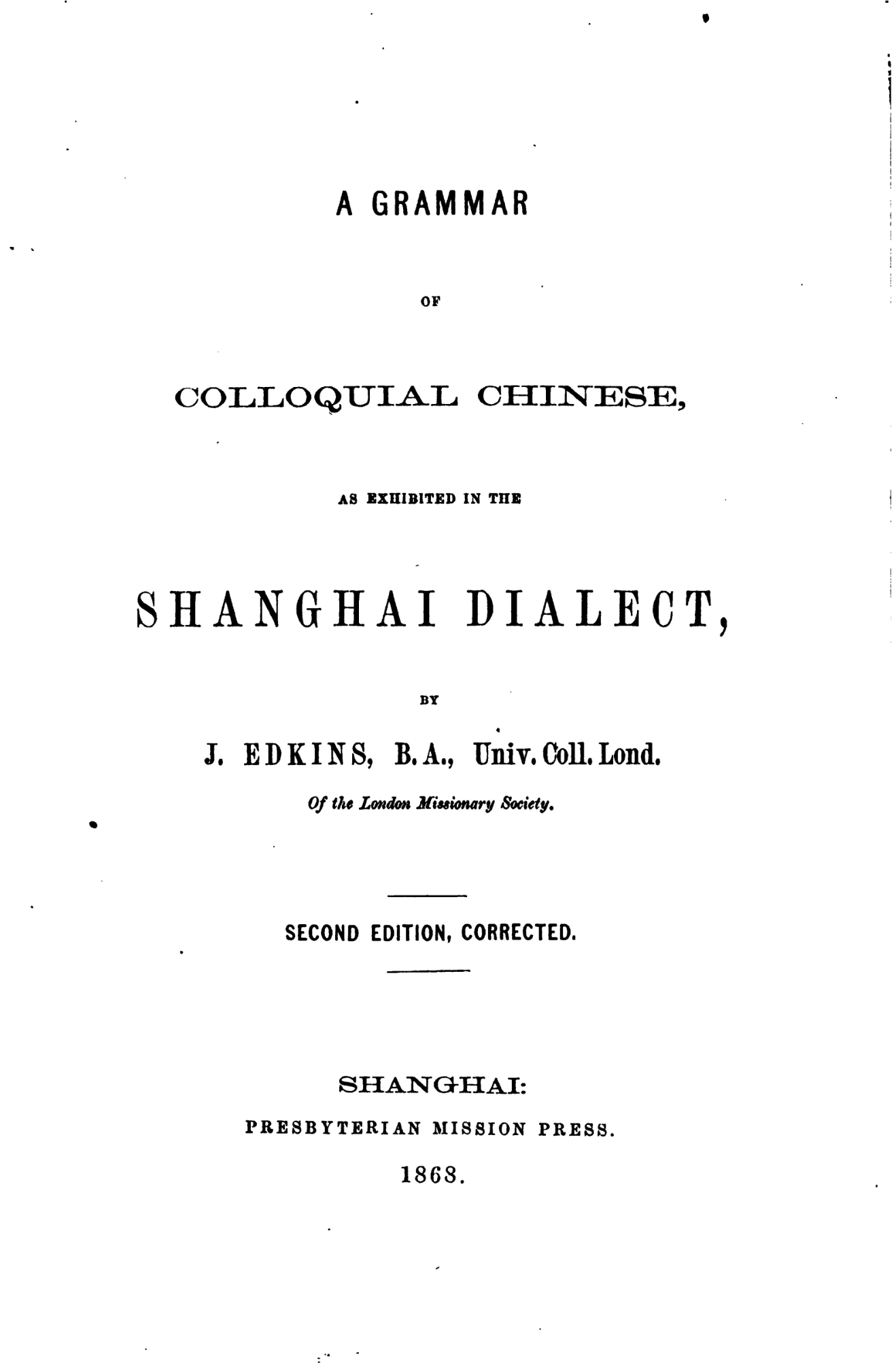
Title Page of Joseph Edkins's 1868 book A Grammar of Colloquial Chinese, as Exhibited in the Shanghai Dialect

Texts in the early Qing dynasty remained much the same as that of the Ming dynasty. Works of the time include the Qingzhongpu (清忠譜) and Doupeng xianhua (豆棚閒話), an early Qing baihua novel. During the 18th century, significant lexical shifts away from that seen in Shange took place; many sources we have of the period are operatic in nature. Representative works from this section include the operas (especially kunqu operas) by Qian Decang (錢德蒼) in the collection Zhuibaiqiu (綴白裘), and the legends written by Shen Qifeng or what are known as Shenshi Sizhong (沈氏四種), as well as huge numbers of tanci (彈詞) ballads.

From the late Qing period to Republican China (the 19th and early 20th centuries), long-form vernacular novels (蘇白小說 or 吳語小說) such as The Sing-song Girls of Shanghai (海上花列傳) and The Nine-tailed Turtle (九尾龜) started appearing. Both above examples are pornographic in nature. Other works include:

- Haitian Hongxue Ji (海天鴻雪記)
- The Nine-tailed Fox (九尾狐)
- Officialdom Unmasked (官場現形記)
- Wuge Jiaji (吳哥甲集)
- He Dian (何典)

Wu-speaking writers who wrote in vernacular Mandarin often left traces of their native varieties in their works, as can be found in Guanchang Xianxing Ji and Fubao Xiantan (負曝閒談). Works in this period also saw an explosion of new vocabulary in Wu varieties to describe their changing world. This clearly reflects the great social changes which were occurring during the time.

At the same time, missionary Joseph Edkins gathered large amounts of data and published several educational works on Shanghainese, as well as Bibles in a few major Wu varieties, including Southern Wu varieties such as Jinhuanese and Wenzhounese.

After the Taiping Rebellion, many migrants from Mandarin-speaking areas migrated into the Wu-speaking area. Xuanzhou Wu therefore significantly receded, which is reflected in the fact that it is now spoken only in the mountainous highlands of southern Anhui. Some territorial changes and stratification occurred, primarily near the Yangtze River. The newly-arrived Huai Chinese varieties have been slowly overtaking the suburban and rural Wu varieties. For instance, in Lishui county, Nanjing prefecture, the Huai variety was confined inside the town itself until the 1960s; it is now overtaking the Wu variety even in rural areas.

Several important proponents of vernacular Chinese in official use, such as Lu Xun and Chao Yuen Ren, were speakers of Northern Wu varieties, in this case Shaoxingese and Changzhounese respectively. Wenzhounese was used during the Second World War to avoid Japanese interception.

==== Since 1949 ====
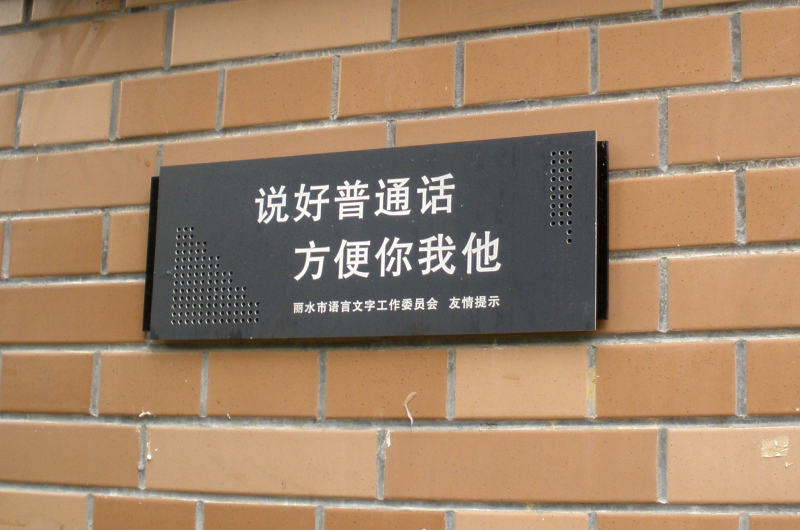
A sign in Lishui urging people to speak Mandarin: "Speak Mandarin well — It's easier for all of us."

After the founding of the People's Republic of China, the strong promotion of Mandarin in the Wu-speaking region yet again influenced the development of Wu Chinese. Curiously, Wenzhounese was used again during the Vietnam War to avoid enemy comprehensibility. (Note: On PRC codebreaking during the Vietnam War, some state that the tongue that was used was not urban Wenzhounese but specifically the variety of the town of Qianku, Cangnan County (then part of Pingyang County). See 访今寻古之三：扑朔迷离说蛮话. 苍南广电网 (in Simplified Chinese).) Wu varieties were gradually excluded from most modern media and schools. With the influx of a migrant non-Wu-speaking population, the near total conversion of public media and organizations to the exclusive use of Mandarin as well as certain Mandarin promotion measures, promotion and regularization of Wu languages became improbable and left them more prone to Mandarinization. In 1992, students in Shanghai were banned from speaking Shanghainese at all times on campuses. As of now, Wu has no official status, no legal protection and there is no officially sanctioned romanization.

It is not uncommon to encounter children who grew up with a regional variant of Mandarin as their parent tongue with little or no fluency in a Wu variety at all. This led to a step up in the preservation and documentation of Wu Chinese, with the first major attempt being the Linguistic Atlas of Chinese Dialects, which surveyed 2,791 locations across the nation, including 121 Wu locations (an increase from the two locations in PKU's earlier surveys). This also led to the formation of an elaborate database including digital recordings of all locations, however, this database is not available to the general public. The atlas's editor, Cao Zhiyun, considers many of these languages "endangered" and has introduced the term 濒危方言 ('languages in danger' or 'endangered local languages') to raise people's attention to the issue, although major international databases, such as Glottolog and Ethnologue, do not share similar sentiments.

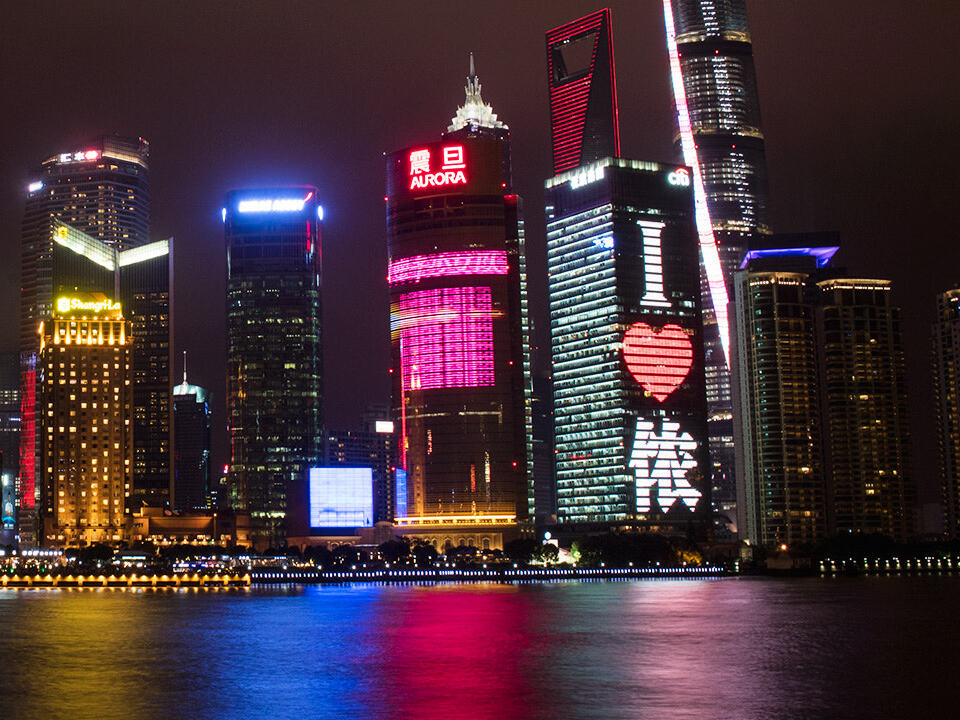
Shanghainese for "I love you" clearly visible on the façade of Shanghai Citibank in Lujiazui, Shanghai

Although more TV programs are appearing in Wu varieties, they are no longer permitted to air during primetime. They are generally more playful than serious and many of these shows, such as Hangzhou's "阿六頭説新聞" ("Old Liutou tells you the news"), provide local or regional news in the variety, but most are limited to fifteen minutes of airtime. Popular video sites such as Youku and Tudou also host a variety of user-uploaded audio and visual media in many Wu varieties, most of which are regional TV shows, although some are user-created songs and the like. A number of books are also appearing to teach people how to speak Wu varieties such as Suzhounese and Shanghainese, the latter of which even having international titles.

Today, popular support for the preservation of Wu languages is very strong, while feature-length movies such as B for Busy and highly successful TV shows such as Blossoms Shanghai have been filmed in Wu varieties (in both aforementioned cases, Shanghainese). It is now not uncommon to see advertisements and billboards, as well as government media, using Wu Chinese written in non-ad hoc orthographies.

== Classification ==
This video shows the difference between Wu and Mandarin. At a church in Paris, the Beijing Mandarin spoken by the pastor (left) was interpreted into Wenzhounese, a Southern Wu language.

A video in Shanghainese, a Northern Wu language.

Wu's place within the greater scope of Sinitic languages is less easily typified than prototypically northern Chinese varieties such as Mandarin or prototypically southern Chinese varieties such as Cantonese. Its original classification, along with the other Sinitic varieties, was established in 1937 by Li Fang-Kuei, whose boundaries more or less have remained the same, and were adopted by Yuan Jiahua in his influential 1961 dialect primer. These limits were also adopted by Chao Yuen Ren, and he even further created a potential proto-system for Wu using the several varieties included in these boundaries. A similar attempt was attempted by William L. Ballard, though with significantly fewer localities and a heavy skew towards the North.

The sole basis of Li Rong's classification was the evolution of Qieyun system voiced stops. This was also Chao's only "necessary and sufficient" requirement for a variety to be Wu. This definition is problematic considering the devoicing process has occurred in many Southern Wu varieties and in Northern Wu varieties situated near Huai Chinese. It furthermore would place unrelated varieties such as Old Xiang in this category, and also includes Hangzhounese despite its linguistically complex situation. Therefore, more elaborate systems have developed, but they still mostly delineate the same regions. Regardless of the justification, the Wu region has been clearly outlined, and Li's boundary in some ways has remained the de facto standard.

In Jerry Norman's usage, Wu dialects can be considered "central dialects" or dialects that are clearly in a transition zone containing features that typify both northern and southern Chinese varieties.

Dialectologists traditionally establish linguistic boundaries based on several overlapping isoglosses of linguistic features. One of the critical historical factors for these boundaries lies in the movement of the population of speakers. This is often determined by the administrative boundaries established during imperial times. As such, imperial boundaries are essential for delineating one variety from another, and many varieties' isogloss clusters line up perfectly with the county boundaries established in imperial times, although some counties contain more than one variety and others may span several counties. Another factor that influences movement and transportation, as well as the establishment of administrative boundaries, is geography. Northernmost Zhejiang and Jiangsu are very flat—being in the middle of a river delta, and as such are more uniform than the more mountainous regions farther south towards Fujian. The Taihu varieties, like Mandarin in the flat northern plains, are more homogeneous than Southern Wu, which has a significantly greater diversity of linguistic forms, likely a direct result of the geography. Coastal varieties also share more featural affinities, likely because the East China Sea provides a means of transportation. The same phenomenon can be seen with Min varieties.

It has also been noted that Huizhou Chinese and the Tongtai branch of Huai Chinese share significant similarities with Wu Chinese.

=== Wu subgroups ===
Wu is divided into two major groups: Northern Wu (Chinese: 北部吳語; pinyin: Běibù Wúyǔ) and Southern Wu (Chinese: 南部吳語; pinyin: Nánbù Wúyǔ), which are not mutually intelligible. Individual words spoken in isolation may be comprehensible among these speakers, but the flowing discourse of everyday life mostly is not. Another lesser group, Western Wu, is synonymous with the Xuanzhou division, which not only has a larger influence from the surrounding Mandarin varieties than much of Northern Wu but also has very unique phonetic innovations, making it typologically quite different from the rest of Wu. Southern Wu is well known among linguists and sinologists as being one of the most internally-diverse among the Sinitic groups, with very little mutual intelligibility between varieties across subgroups.

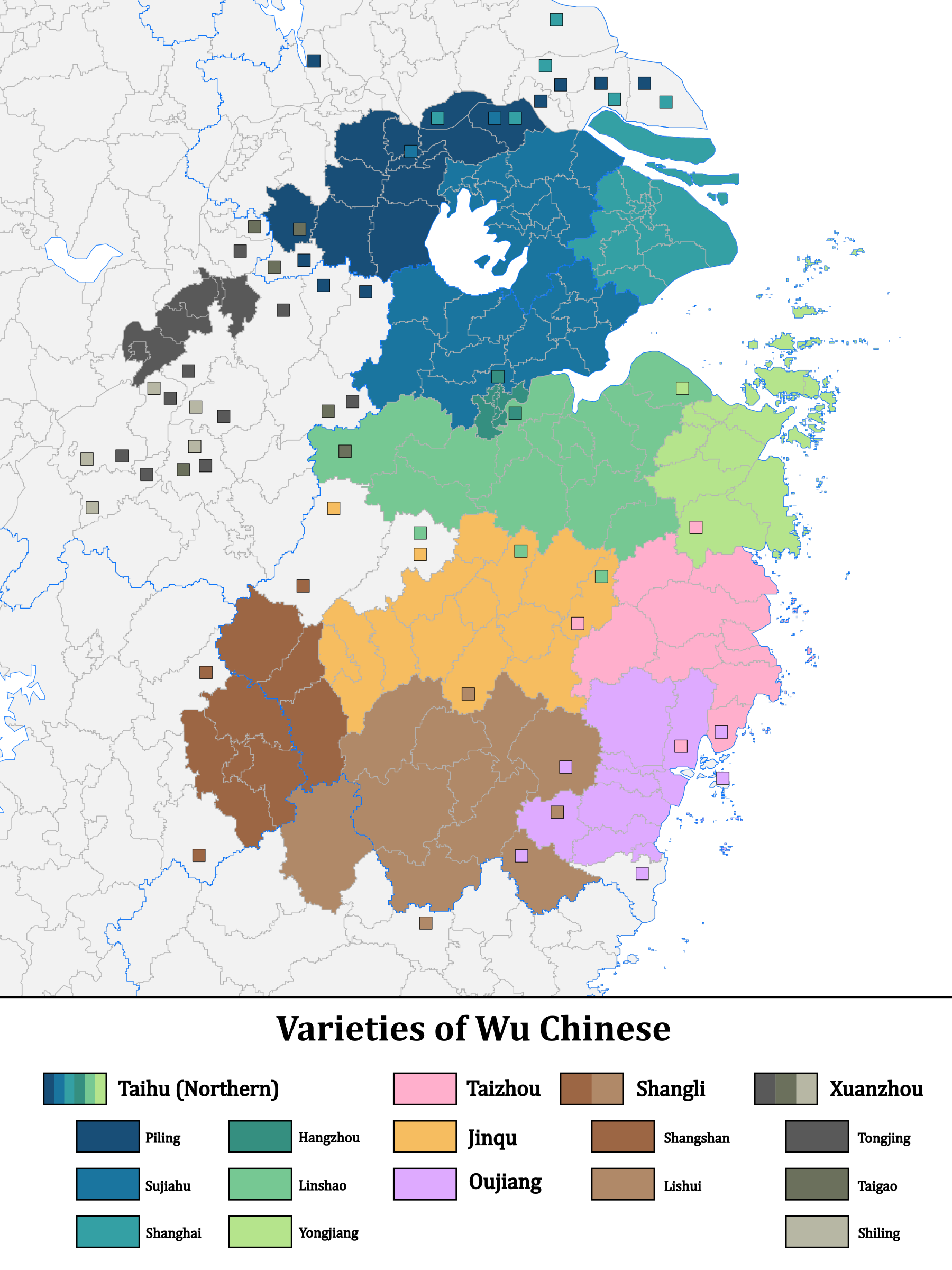
Map of the main subgroups of Wu in its core area. Note that this map does not align with that of the original Language Atlas of China, but instead with the second edition of the Atlas

In the first edition of Li's Language Atlas of China, Wu was divided into six groups (片):

- Taihu (太湖片) (ie. varieties around Lake Tai): Also often referred to as Northern Wu (北部吳語), as well as Yunhe Wu (運河片). Spoken in southern Jiangsu and northern Zhejiang, namely in Changzhou, Wuxi, Suzhou, eastern Nantong, Jiaxing, most of Huzhou, most of Hangzhou, Shaoxing, most of Ningbo, and Zhoushan prefectures, Shanghai municipality, as well as parts of Zhenjiang, Taizhou, and Nanjing prefectures in Jiangsu. This group makes up the largest population among all Wu speakers, estimated to be 47.26 million in 2012. The local varieties of this region are mostly mutually intelligible with one another. The Atlas further divides this group into the following subgroups (小片):
  - Suhujia (蘇滬嘉), referring to Suzhou, Shanghai, and Jiaxing.
  - Tiaoxi or Shaoxi (苕溪), referring to Huzhou
    - The above two groups are merged in some publications, resulting in a Sujiahu (蘇嘉湖) group, with around 7.57 million speakers excluding Shanghai. Note that the "hu" here refers to Huzhou rather than Shanghai.
    - A parallel Shanghai branch has also been suggested due to reasons such as Shanghai's unique history and the merged Suhujia-Tiaoxi branch being "too populous". The Shanghai branch can itself be subdivided into Jiading (嘉定), Songjiang (松江), Liantang (練塘), and Chongming (崇明) clusters. The Shanghai branch has around 15.86 million speakers.
  - Piling (毗陵; 'near Nanjing'), referring to Changzhou, with around 8.14 million speakers.
  - Hangzhou (杭州), which includes only Hangzhounese, with around 8.97 million speakers.
  - Linshao (臨紹), referring to Lin'an and Shaoxing, with around 8.97 million speakers.
  - Yongjiang (甬江), referring to Ningbo, with around 4.49 million speakers.
- Taizhou (台州): A pluricentric variety, spoken in and around Taizhou prefecture, Zhejiang. Taizhounese, as it is also called, is the closest to Northern Wu among the Southern varieties. Spoken by around 6.25 million people.
- Oujiang (甌江): Spoken in and around the Wenzhou prefecture, Zhejiang, by around 4.92 million speakers. This variety is the very distinctive and is both internally and externally highly mutually unintelligible. Some dialectologists even treat it as a variety separate from the rest of Wu by using the monosyllable Ou, the abbreviated form of Wenzhou, suffixed with the term "language", hence Ou Chinese (甌語). It is also dubbed Dong'ou (東甌) by Zhengzhang Shangfang.
- Wuzhou (婺州): Spoken in and around Jinhua prefecture, Zhejiang.
- Chu–Qu (處衢): Spoken in and around Lishui and Quzhou prefectures in Zhejiang as well as in eastern parts of Shangrao prefecture in Jiangxi. It is further subdivided into Longqu (龍衢) and Chuzhou (處州) subbranches in the Atlas.
- Xuanzhou (宣州): spoken in the linguistically highly diverse southern parts of Anhui, as well as in Gaochun and Lishui counties, Nanjing prefecture, by around 3.38 million speakers. The Atlas divides the branch into Taigao (太高), Tongjing (銅涇), and Shiling (石陵) subbranches, with around 2.60, 0.48, and 0.20 speakers respectively.

Cao Zhiyun rearranged some of the Southern Wu divisions based on a larger corpus of data, which was later adopted by the second edition of Li's Atlas. According to Cao, it can be divided into three broad divisions:

- Jinqu (金衢), which contains much of Jinhua prefecture, eastern parts of Quzhou prefecture (including Quzhou itself), and Jinyun county in Lishui prefecture. Spoken by around 6.39 million speakers.
- Shangli (上麗), which has 6.37 million speakers and is divided into two subdivisions:
  - Shangshan (上山), which contains the Wu-speaking parts of Shangrao prefecture and western Quzhou prefecture, spoken by 3.78 million speakers.
  - Lishui (麗水), which contains much of Lishui prefecture, Taishun county in Wenzhou prefecture, and Pucheng county in Nanping prefecture, Fujian, spoken by around 2.59 million speakers.

Oujiang and Taizhou remained unchanged, the latter due to it not being included in the study.

== Phonology ==
Wu varieties typically possess a larger phonological inventory than many Sinitic languages. Many varieties also have tone systems known for highly complex tone sandhi. Phonologies of Wu varieties are diverse and hard to generalize. As such, only typologically significant features will be discussed here. For more information, refer to individual varieties' pages.

In terms of consonants, those in initial positions are more plentiful than those in finals. Finals typically only permit two consonant phonemes, a singular nasal and a glottal stop. Some varieties however, may deviate from this and have features such as the addition of -/k/, or the omission of the glottal stop. Wu varieties typically preserve Qieyun system voiced initials (/b/, /d/, /ɡ/, /z/, /v/, etc.) though some varieties have lost this feature. Implosives are also occasionally found in Wu varieties, primarily in suburban Shanghainese varieties, as well as in Yongkangese.

Wu languages have typologically high numbers of vowels and are on par with Germanic languages in having the largest vowel quality inventories in the world. The Jinhui variety, spoken in Shanghai's Fengxian District, can be analyzed to have 20 vowel qualities. The abnormal number of vowels in Wu is due in part to rimes ending in glottal stops may be analysed as a short vowel in many varieties, as well as unique sound shifts, such as the tensing of Qieyun system shan (山) and xian (咸) rimes, among other factors.

Both breathy and creaky voice are also found in Wu varieties. Breathy voice appears in Northern Wu and may act as a depressor that lowers the pitch of the entire syllable's realization. Creaky voice, on the other hand, is found in Taizhounese, and is associated with the rising tone category (上聲).

Xuanzhou Wu is phonologically very unique and has a host of complex syllables, such as:

- /tʃɦʯəi^{35}/ 水; 'water' (Yanchi township, Xuancheng prefecture 宣城雁翅)
- /ɾ̥ɦiɔ^{55}/ 條; 'strip' (Jingxian 涇縣)

=== Tones ===
Wu varieties typically have 7–8 tonemes, though varieties may have as many as 12 tones or as few as 5. Many merge the historical light rising category (陽上) with the light departing (陽去). The reflexes of the checked tone categories (入聲) may be complex. Jinhuanese irregularly merges it with other tone categories, while Wenzhounese has lengthened tone contours rather than the typological norm of short, contourless tones.

Tone sandhi in Sinitic languages can occur for phonological, syntactic, or morphological reasons, but most varieties use it only to a limited extent. This stands in stark contrast with Wu, in which all three can trigger tone sandhi. Examples of situations that can trigger unique tone sandhi chains include (but are not limited to):

- Polysyllabic terms

結棍; 'sturdy', 'awesome' /tɕiɪʔ^{44>33} kuəŋ^{334>44}/ (Shanghainese)

- Verb-object compounds

笑別人; 'to laugh at others' /siæ^{523>51} bəʔ^{23>22} ȵin^{223>33}/ (Suzhounese)

- Verb-complementizer compounds

弄錯; 'to do incorrectly' /loŋ^{113>23} tsʰou^{45}/ (Hangzhounese)

- Particles such as aspect markers or sentence final particles

老過; 'have been old' /lɒ^{113} ku^{33>52}/ (Shaoxingese)

- Numeral-classifier compounds

九斤; 'nine pounds (of)' /tɕiɵ^{424>42} tɕin^{55>33}/ (Chongmingese)

- Reduplication

桶桶; 'every bucket' /dao^{113>341} dao^{113>0}/ (Tangxinese)

- Contractions and ellipsis
- Specification

板凳; '(plank) chair' /pɛ̃^{34>44} təŋ^{53}/ (Xiaoshanese)

- Erhua

麻雀兒; 'sparrow' /mɤa^{313>33} tsiəʔ-i^{44>55}/ (Jinhuanese)

The relevant changed tone is highlighted in bold.

Tone sandhi in Sinitic languages can typically be classified as left- or right-dominant systems, depending on whether the leftmost or rightmost item keeps its tone. Both systems exist in Wu Chinese, with most varieties having both concurrently. Right-dominant is more associated with changes in part of speech, whereas left-dominant is typically seen in polysyllabic terms. Minimal pairs between types of sandhi also exist, such as /tsʰɑ^{33} vɛ̃^{213}/ 炒飯; 'to fry rice' and /tsʰɑ^{334} vɛ̃^{51}/ 炒飯; 'fried rice' in Zhenhainese, or /tɕiɵ^{42} ʔʋ^{33}/ 九壺; 'nine flasks' and /tɕiɵ^{42} ʔʋ^{55}/ 酒壺; 'wine flask' in Chongmingese.

== Grammar ==
Wu languages' grammar is largely similar to that of Standard Chinese, though they do diverge in quite striking ways, such as in verb-object-complementizer phrases. Since differences exist between varieties, only general trends will be included below.

=== Syntax ===
Much like other Chinese languages, Wu languages have classifiers, primarily mark verbs by aspect (though it has been suggested that there is some evidence of tenses in Old Shanghainese), have a great number of particles (including sentence-final particles), possess SVO word order with topic-fronting.

Topic-fronting is more common in Wu Chinese than in most other Sinitic languages. It is commonly seen in closed questions, in which the topic is dislocated to avoid confusion.

昨-夜 小張 有 條 大-魚 釣-牢。
zo-yi shiaeci yau diae dou-ngeu tiae-leo
yesterday-night Xiaozhang have CL big-fish catch-PTCL
Xiaozhang caught a big fish yesterday night. (Wenzhounese)

Word order at times differs between Wu and other Chinese varieties. In the aforementioned verb-object-complementizer (VOC) phrases, VOC is common in Wu whereas VCO is dominant in Mandarin.

我 講 渠 弗-過。
ngao kon ge feq-ciue
1S speak 3S NEG-over
I can't help him. (Kaihuanese)

Similarly, ditransitive constructions typically see the direct object placed in front of the indirect object, whereas the opposite is true for Mandarin varieties.

撥 本-書 佢。
poeq pen-shiu gei
give CL-book 3S
Give me a book. (Tiantainese)

The verb "to give", 撥 is a checked tone variant of 把 and is commonly found in Wu languages. It is also used to mark the passive voice.

茶杯 撥 俚 敲-破-哉。
zope peq li khau-phu-tse
teacup by 3S strike-shatter-PTCL
The teacup was smashed by him. (Suzhounese)

Reduplication is common, and many varieties make greater use of it than Standard Chinese. For instance, verbal reduplication can be used to indicate the imperative mood, as well as the perfect aspect.

話 講講 靈清。
wa kan-kan lin-chin
word say-say clear
Speak clearly. (Hangzhounese)

飯 吃吃 再 過去。
vae kiq-kiq tse chi
rice eat-eat then go
We'll go after we finish our meal. (Xiaoshanese)

Elision of the negation particle in closed question constructions is also common in Northern Wu but ungrammatical in Standard Chinese. In some varieties, this triggers its own tone sandhi patterns.

儂 要 ~~勿~~ 要 吃飯？
non- iau- ~~veq~~- iau chiq-ve
2S want ~~NEG~~ want eat.rice
Do you want to eat (a meal)? (Shanghainese)

要要 in the above sentence is pronounced /iɔ^{334>34} iɔ^{334>22}/ rather than the expected left-prominent pattern, which would be /iɔ^{334>33} iɔ^{334>44}/.

=== Morphology ===
Much like other Chinese languages, Wu languages are analytic, lack inflection, and most morphemes are monosyllabic. Words in Wu are typically polysyllabic ciyu (詞語), which are composed of multiple morphemes. Common bound morphemes include:

- 阿～: 阿魚; 'fish'; aq-ng (Shanghainese); 阿飛; 'gangster'; aq-fi (Yuyaonese); 阿爺; 'grandfather'; a-yi (Wenzhounese)
- ～頭: 鼻頭; 'nose'; biq-dei (Changzhounese), 外頭; 'outside'; nga-deu (Shaoxingese); 磚頭; 'brick'; ciuan-tieu (Jinhuanese)
- ～子: 角子; 'coin'; kau-tsy (Yongkangese), 車子; 'automobile'; tsho-tsy (Kunshanese)

- ～則, (Note: This is not the etymological spelling (本字) of the term, but instead is a very common phonetic match.) the checked tone variant of 子: 牙刷則; 'toothbrush'; ngo-shiuq-tseq (Yixingese); 扇則; 'fan'; shoe-tseq (Changshunese)

- ～兒: 攤兒; 'stall'; than-ng (Quzhounese), 蓋兒; 'lid'; ken (Huangyanese)

AAB adjectival reduplication, where it has an intensive meaning as seen in terms such as 筆筆直; 'very straight', 石石硬; 'very firm', is more common in Wu than Standard Chinese.

== Vocabulary ==
For more terms, refer to the Wu Swadesh lists on Wiktionary.

Wu Chinese varieties share a number of lexical innovations and retentions, though it does also have a considerable number of loanwords from Old Mandarin via the literary layer from the Southern Song dynasty.

Wu Chinese common shared lexica include:

- Personal pronouns, namely those cognate with 爾; 'you' and 佢; 'he/she/it', as well as 儂; 'person', 'plural'
- A large number of grammatical particles derived from 個, such as the possessive, demonstratives, and certain adverbs (eg. 'so, such')
- A fricative-initial negator, ie. 弗/勿
- Substrate words, such as 白相; 'to play', 活猻; 'monkey', 落蘇; 'aubergine'
- 物事; 'thing' and 事體; 'matter'
- Kinship terminology such as 呣媽; 'mother', 娘舅; 'maternal uncle'
- Basic verbs such as 汏; 'to wash', 縛; 'to tie', 撥; 'to give'

Many of the above are also exhibited in Hangzhounese.

Old Mandarin loanwords are often geographically distributed along trade routes out of Hangzhou. Such terms include:

- 立; 'to stand' (cf. native 徛)
- 穿; 'to wear' (cf. native 着)
- 多少; 'how many' (cf. native 幾)

=== Western loanwords ===
Foreign influence in the port of Shanghai has caused Wu varieties, especially in the North, to gain a number of loanwords from languages such as English and French through Chinese Pidgin English. Some loanwords even entered mainstream Chinese and so can also be found in other Chinese languages. Such loanwords include:

- 水門汀; sy-men-thin, from English cement
- 巧克力; chiau-kheq-liq, from English chocolate
- 沙發; so-faq, from English sofa
- 違司; 'rag'; we-sy, from English waste
- 阿拉加; aq-la-ka, from French à la carte
- 凡士林; ve-zy-lin, from English vaseline
- 骯三; 'low-quality'; aon-se, from English on sale
- 引擎; yin-jin, from English engine
- 馬賽克; mo-se-kheq, from English mosaic
- 羅宋; lu-son, from English Russian. Spread to other Chinese varieties in terms such as 羅宋湯; Luósòngtāng; 'borscht'.
- 谷貓迎; 'good morning'; koq-mau-gnin and 谷拿脱; 'good night'; koq-ne-theq, from English good morning and good night respectively

Terms above provided in Shanghainese.

=== Literary and colloquial pronunciations ===
Wu, like other Chinese languages, have literary and colloquial readings of many characters. The literary layer was brought to the region during the Southern Song dynasty when the imperial court was moved to Lin'an, today Hangzhou. Common features of literary sound changes include:

- Palatalization of dorsals

- 家: /ko^{53}/, /tɕia^{53}/ (Ningbonese)
- 孝: /hau^{412}/, /ɕiau^{412}/ (Yixingese)
- 交: /kɔ^{334}/, /tɕiɔ^{334}/ (Lanxinese)

- Lowering of high back rounded vowels

- 馬: /mo^{214}/, /ma^{214}/ (Tiantainese)
- 大: /do^{212}/, /da^{212}/ (Shangraonese)

- Frication of historical ri-initial (日) syllables

- 仁: /ȵin^{213}/, /zən^{213}/ (Chuanshanese)
- 日: /ȵieʔ^{22}/, /zeʔ^{22}/ (Cixinese)
- 熱: /ȵiəʔ^{212}/, /ʑyəʔ^{212}/ (Jinhuanese)

Words do not necessarily have to use only literary or only colloquial pronunciations, eg. 大學; 'university'; da-ghoq /da^{11} ɦoʔ^{44}/ (Shanghainese): da is literary, whereas ghoq is colloquial.

== Orthography ==
Wu Chinese is primarily written in Chinese characters. Since most speakers are in the People's Republic of China, Simplified Chinese characters are often used. Phonetic matching is often used becaue of the lack of knowledge regarding the etymologies of many terms though texts such as the Great Dictionary of Shanghainese (上海話大詞典) serve as de facto recommended standardized forms, as is seen in government media.

=== Romanization ===
Wu Chinese does not have any government-recognized romanization system. Adapted forms of Hanyu Pinyin are commonly used because of the relative familiarity of the system by speakers of Wu Chinese. Online communities such as Wu-Chinese and Wugniu have created pluricentric romanization systems, largely based on 19th- and 20th-century Western textual sources.

== Literature ==
The genres of kunqu opera and tanci song, appearing in the Ming dynasty, were the first instances of the use of Wu dialect in literature. By the turn of the 20th century it was used in several novels that had prostitution as a subject. In many of these novels, Wu is mainly used as dialogue of prostitute characters. In one work, Shanghai Flowers by Han Bangqing, all of the dialogue is in Wu. Wu originally developed in genres related to oral performance. It was used in manners related to oral performance when it proliferated in written literature and it was widely used in fiction about prostitutes, a particular genre, and not in other genres. Donald B. Snow, author of Cantonese as Written Language: The Growth of a Written Chinese Vernacular, compared the development of Wu in this manner to the patterns of Baihua and Japanese vernacular writing.

According to Jean Duval, author of "The Nine-Tailed Turtle: Pornography or 'fiction of exposure", at the time The Nine-tailed Turtle by Zhang Chunfan (張春帆) was published, it was one of the most popular novels written in the Wu dialect. Magnificent Dreams in Shanghai (海上繁華夢) by Sun Jiazhen (孫家振) was another example of a prostitute novel with Wu dialogue from the turn of the 20th century.

Snow wrote that Wu literature "achieved a certain degree of prominence" by 1910. After 1910 there had been no novels which were as popular as The Nine-tailed Turtle or the critical acclaim garnered by Shanghai Flowers. In the popular fiction of the early 20th century the usage of Wu remained in use in prostitute dialogue but, as asserted by Snow, "apparently" did not extend beyond that. In 1926 Hu Shih stated that of all of the Chinese dialects, within literature, Wu had the brightest future. Snow concluded that instead Wu dialect writing became "a transient phenomenon that died out not long after its growth gathered steam."

Snow argued that the primary reason was the increase of prestige and importance in Baihua, and that one other contributing reason was changing market factors since Shanghai's publishing industry, which grew, served all of China and not just Shanghai. Duval argued that many Chinese critics had a low opinion of Wu works, mainly originating from the eroticism within them, and that contributed to the decline in Wu literature.

== See also ==
- Chinatowns in Queens § Flushing
- Hua Baoshan
- Huizhou Chinese, a group of Sinitic languages that has similarities with Wu
- Jiangnan, Wu (region)
  - Speakers of Wu Chinese
  - Wuyue
  - Wuyue culture
- List of varieties of Chinese
- Romanization of Wu Chinese
