= Xuanzhou Wu =

Dialect

- Native to: People's Republic of China
- Region: Southern Anhui and bordering areas
- Speakers: 3.38 million (2012)
- Language family: Sino-Tibetan: Sinitic; Chinese; Wu; Xuanzhou Wu

Language codes
- ISO 639-3: None (mis)
- Glottolog: xuan1238
- Linguasphere: 79-AAA-dc (Tai-gao) + 79-AAA-dd (Tong-jing) + 79-AAA-de (Shi-ling) (together comprising parts of "remnant" west-Wu or Xuan-zhou)

Xuanzhou Wu (Chinese: 宣州吳語; pinyin: Xuānzhōu Wúyǔ) is the western Wu Chinese language, spoken in and around Xuancheng, Anhui province. The language has declined since the Taiping Rebellion, with an influx of Mandarin-speaking immigrants from north of the Yangtze River.

== Dialects ==
Xuancheng dialect is representative.

- Xuancheng
- Tong–Jing
  - Tongling dialect
  - Jing County dialect
  - Dunchang dialect
  - Fanchang dialect
  - Hui-Shui dialect
  - Maijie dialect
  - Maya dialect
  - Qidu dialect
  - Qingyi dialect
  - Shu-Xi dialect
  - Shuiyang dialect
  - Shu-Xi dialect
  - Tongling dialect
- Shi–Ling
  - Shitai dialect
  - Lingyang (陵阳) dialect
  - Gui-Chi dialect
  - Huang-Shan dialect
  - Jing-Xian dialect
  - Qing-Yang dialect
- Tai–Gao
  - Taiping dialect
  - Gaochun dialect
  - etc.
