= Linguistic Atlas of Chinese Dialects =

2008 atlas of Chinese language features

- Editor: Cao Zhiyun
- Original title: 汉语方言地图集; Hànyǔ Fāngyán Dìtú Jí
- Language: Chinese
- Subject: Dialect geography
- Publisher: Commercial Press
- Publication date: 2008
- Publication place: China
- Media type: Print

The Linguistic Atlas of Chinese Dialects (Chinese: 汉语方言地图集; pinyin: Hànyǔ Fāngyán Dìtú Jí), edited by Cao Zhiyun and published in 2008 in three volumes, is a dialect atlas documenting the geography of varieties of Chinese. Unlike the Language Atlas of China (1987), which aims to map the boundaries of both minority languages and Chinese dialect groups, the new atlas is a collection of maps of various features of dialects, in the tradition of the Atlas linguistique de la France and its successors.

== Methods ==
Top-level groups of Chinese varieties identified in the Language Atlas of China, used in the selection of survey sites for the dialect atlas

The project spanned 8 years, from 2001 to 2007. A year of preparatory work began in December 2001, including selecting survey sites, codifying fieldwork procedures and conducting trial surveys.

Survey sites for the Atlas

The 930 sites throughout China and Taiwan were selected so that there was usually one site per county in southeast China and one site in every three or four counties in the Mandarin and Jin areas, preferably in non-contiguous counties. Thus, for example, there were 92 sites each in Guangdong and Hubei, but only 19 in Sichuan and 21 in Shaanxi. The metropolitan district of each of 36 cities – provincial capitals plus Suzhou, Xiamen and Meizhou – was included as a survey site. The remaining 894 sites were generally chosen to be representative of rural dialects of their county, so dialect islands were omitted.

A questionnaire was compiled, to elicit the pronunciation of 425 characters representing common Chinese morphemes, the local term for 470 items and the local form of 110 grammatical constructions. Of the 930 sites selected, 91 sites were identified as key sites representing various dialect subgroups, to be subject to additional surveys. At these sites tone sandhi phenomena were to be investigated, and a much longer character list would be used.

Fieldwork was conducted between December 2002 and December 2006, and the resulting data entered into a geographic information system. The 46 fieldworkers, 34 of whom held doctoral degrees in Chinese dialectology, were assigned to areas they were already familiar with. A single informant was used from each site, typically a male born between 1931 and 1945 who had spent almost all of his life at the site. This was consistent with the usual practice in dialect geography elsewhere in the world of using nonmobile, older, rural males (NORMs), as such informants are considered more likely to reflect the traditional speech of the area.

The maps were compiled and collated throughout 2007.

== Contents ==
The finished work consists of 510 maps, each containing data for all 930 sites, in three volumes:

1. Yǔyīn juǎn 语音卷 [Phonetics], ISBN 978-7-100-05774-5. These 205 maps trace various significant phonetic developments from earlier forms of Chinese, such as the development of the tonal categories, voiced initial obstruents, initial consonants in palatal environments and consonantal codas.
2. Cíhuì juǎn 词汇卷 [Lexicon], ISBN 978-7-100-05784-4. Most of the 203 lexicon maps show the particular expression used at each site for a given concept, displayed as Chinese characters standing for cognate morphemes.
3. Yǔfǎ juǎn 语法卷, [Grammar], ISBN 978-7-100-05785-1. The 102 grammar maps show the distribution of different syntactic constructions or grammatical morphemes.

In each map of the atlas, the different forms are classified, but the classifications are not explained, and must be deduced by the reader. A digital version of the atlas is in preparation, to include additional maps and the full survey data.

== See also ==
- Languages of China
- Demographics of the People's Republic of China
- Languages of Hong Kong
- Languages of Macau
