= Taizhou dialect =

Wu dialect of Zhejiang, China

Taizhou
- Native to: People's Republic of China
- Region: Zhejiang
- Language family: Sino-Tibetan: Sinitic; Chinese; Wu; Taizhou Wu; Taizhou

Language codes
- ISO 639-3: –
- ISO 639-6: tzoj
- Glottolog: None

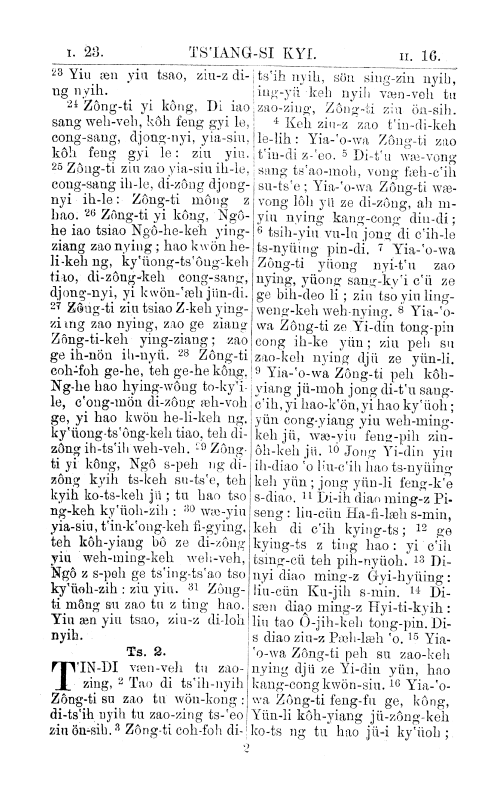
Bible in Taizhou Romanised (Genesis), published by the British and Foreign Bible Society.

The Taizhou dialect (Taizhou dialect: T'e-tsiu wa; simplified Chinese: 台州话; traditional Chinese: 台州話; pinyin: Tāizhōuhuà) is a dialect of Wu Chinese. It is spoken in the city of Taizhou in Zhejiang province, China. It is only partially intelligible with Shanghainese.

== Phonetics ==
=== Consonants ===
Romanization	(IPA)	Examples
p	[p]	百班冰包
p'	[pʰ]	拍派拼泡
b	[b]	白排病刨
m	[m]	麥買命貓
f	[f]	弗反風飛
v	[v]	佛飯縫肥
t	[t]	搭單東刀
t'	[tʰ]	塔攤通討
d	[d]	達談動逃
n	[n]	捺難農腦
l	[l]	辣懶弄老
k	[k]	格干公告
k'	[kʰ]	客看空考
g	[ɡ]	狂渠
ng	[ŋ]	我牙耳咬
h	[h]	好虎海漢
'	[ɦ]	號害寒何
ky	[c]	今记吉九
ky'	[cʰ]	轻气挈吃
gy	[ɟ]	琴奇杰求
ny	[ȵ]	日念人繞
hy	[ç]	許希訓晓
y	[j]	陽耶園有
ts	[ts]	只子早珍
ts'	[tsʰ]	七此草稱
dz	[dz]	遲查丈
s	[s]	息思手身
z	[z]	十字就善
c	[tɕy], [tʃ]	珠轉種祝
c'	[tɕʰy], [tʃʰ]	取穿充出
dj	[dʑy], [dʒ]	住著重濁
sh	[ɕy], [ʃ]	說水
j	[ʑy], [ʒ]	樹從
w	[w]	華會活還
	[ʔ]	烏音愛安

- [m] and [ŋ] are syllabic consonants

=== Vowels ===
Monophthongs	i	w	ü
a [a]	ia [ia]	wa [ua]	-
e [e]	-	we [ue]	-
u [u]	iu [iu]	wu [u]	-
æn [ɛ̃]	iæn [iɛ̃]	wæn [uɛ̃]	-
ön [ø̃]	in [iẽ]	wön [uø̃]	ün [yø̃]
-	-	-	-
æ [ɛ]	[ɹ̩]	o [o]	ô [ɔ]
eo [ɤ]	i [i]	ü [y]	-

Diphthongs	i	w	ü
ao [aɒ]	iao [iaɒ]	-	-
ang [aŋ]	iang [iaŋ]	uang [uaŋ]	-
ông [ɔŋ]	-	uông [uɔŋ]	üông [yɔŋ]
ong [oŋ]	-	-	üong [yoŋ]
eng [əŋ]	ing [iŋ]	weng [uəŋ]	üing [yŋ]

Glottals	i	w	ü
æh [æʔ]	-	-	-
ah [aʔ]	iah [iaʔ]	-	-
eh [əʔ]	ih [iʔ]	weh [uəʔ]	üih [yʔ]
ôh [ɔʔ]	-	-	üôh [yɔʔ]
oh [oʔ]	-	-	üoh [yoʔ]
