= Karlgren–Li reconstruction of Middle Chinese =

Phonetic notation for Middle Chinese

The Karlgren–Li reconstruction of Middle Chinese is a representation of the sounds of Middle Chinese devised by Bernhard Karlgren, revised by Li Fang-Kuei in 1971 to remedy a number of minor defects.

== Sources for Middle Chinese ==
The Qieyun rime dictionary was created by Lu Fayan in 601 as a guide to proper pronunciation, particularly for the reading of classic texts. The dictionary divided characters between the four tones, which were subdivided into 193 rhyme groups and then into homophone groups. The pronunciation of each homophone group is given by a fanqie formula, a pair of common characters respectively indicating the initial and final sounds of the syllable. Lu Fayan's work was very influential, and led to a series of expanded and corrected versions following the same structure, the most important of which is the Guangyun (1007–08). The Qieyun was thought lost until the mid-20th century, and scholars worked from the Guangyun. Fortunately it was later found that the Guangyun had preserved the phonological system of the Qieyun with no significant change. The Qing dynasty scholar Chen Li analysed the fanqie spellings of the Guangyun, determining which initial and final spellers represented the same sounds, and thus enumerating the initials and finals of the underlying system. However this method gave no indication of how these were pronounced.

A series of rime tables from the Song dynasty incorporated a more sophisticated analysis, though the language had changed since the time of the Qieyun. The initials were identified and categorized by place and manner of articulation. Finals were classified into 16 rhyme classes (攝 shè). Within each rhyme class, syllables were classified as either "open" (開 kāi) or "closed" (合 hé), as belonging to one of the four tones, and as belonging to one of four divisions (等 děng), indicated by rows of the table. The Qing philologists found that some of the finals of the rime dictionaries were always placed in the first row, some always in the second and some always in the fourth, and they were thus named finals of divisions I, II and IV respectively. The remaining finals were spread across the second, third and fourth rows, and were later called division III finals.

== Karlgren's reconstruction ==
Karlgren believed that the Qieyun system (represented in his work by the later Guangyun) reflected the standard speech of the Sui-Tang capital Chang'an (modern Xi'an), which spread across the empire except for Fujian. He attempted to determine the sounds of this "Ancient Chinese" (now called Middle Chinese) by applying the comparative method to data that he had collected on modern dialects, as well as the pronunciations of Chinese loanwords in other languages. Since the discovery of an early copy of the Qieyun dictionary in 1947, most scholars believe it reflects a combination of reading pronunciation standards from the capitals of the late Northern and Southern dynasties period.

Karlgren's transcription involved a large number of consonants and vowels, many of them very unevenly distributed; indeed he disdained phonemic analysis as a "craze". In a few cases he was unable to distinguish the pronunciations of ancient finals, and thus gave them identical transcriptions. His notation, based on Johan August Lundell's Swedish Dialect Alphabet, went through several revisions from his Études sur la phonologie chinoise (1915–1926) through to the Compendium of Phonetics in Ancient and Archaic Chinese (1954). The same notation was used in his Grammata Serica Recensa (1957), a dictionary of Middle and Old Chinese that remains a standard reference, even though Karlgren's reconstruction of Old Chinese has been superseded by those of Li Fang-Kuei and William Baxter, among others.

In the early 1970s, Li Fang-Kuei used an amended version of Karlgren's transcription as a point of departure for his reconstruction of Old Chinese phonology. Li addressed some of the criticisms of Karlgren's system, revising some initials and distinguishing finals that Karlgren had combined. Although Karlgren's view of Middle Chinese as a single spoken variety is no longer widely held, his transcription, as revised by Li, is still widely used as a notation for the Qieyun categories.

=== Initials ===
Li replaced Karlgren's indicator of aspiration, a reversed apostrophe, with the letter h for convenience. While Karlgren had originally reconstructed the voiced stop initials as aspirated, Li treated them as unaspirated. Li also recast Karlgren's alveolar dentals as retroflex, citing the similar distribution shown by the retroflex affricates.

Initials with traditional names						Notes
幫 p-	滂 ph-	並 b-	明 m-			
端 t-	透 th-	定 d-	泥 n-		來 l-	divisions I and IV only
知 ṭ-	徹 ṭh-	澄 ḍ-	娘 ṇ-			retroflex, division II only
精 ts-	清 tsh-	從 dz-		心 s-	邪 z-	divisions I, III and IV
莊 tṣ-	初 tṣh-	崇 dẓ-		生 ṣ-		retroflex, division II only
章 tś-	昌 tśh-	船 dź-	日 ńź-	書 ś-	禪 ź-	alveolo-palatals, division III only
見 k-	溪 kh-	羣 g-	疑 ng-	曉 x-	匣 γ-	
影 ·-	云 j-	以 ji-				the centred dot represents a glottal stop

Most scholars now believe that the dź- and ź- initials were interchanged in the rime tables, which were compiled after those sounds had merged in daily speech.

=== Vowels ===
Karlgren used a selection of vowel symbols from the Swedish Dialect Alphabet, here shown with IPA equivalents where different:

	Unrounded			Rounded
	Front	Central	Back	Back
high	i			u
upper mid	e			o
mid		ə		
lower mid	ä (ɛ)			å (ɔ)
near-low	ɛ (æ)	ɒ (ɐ)		
low	a		â (ɑ)	

In addition, ậ denotes a shorter (or centralized) variant of â, while ă, ĕ and ə̆ denote shorter variants of a, e and ə, respectively.

=== Finals ===
Karlgren divided the division III finals into two groups:

- type α (mixed) finals could occur in rows 2, 3 and 4 of the rime tables, and with all kinds of initials.
- type β (pure) finals could only occur in row 3 of the rime tables, and only with labial, velar or laryngeal initials. These finals also conditioned labiodentalization in Late Middle Chinese.

Li made a number of changes to remedy limitations of Karlgren's system:

- He replaced Karlgren's -i̯- with the more convenient and conventional -j-.
- Where Karlgren had combined a pair of finals as -i, Li distinguished them as -i and -ï.
- Similarly a pair of finals initially treated as -ai became -ai and -aï.
- Karlgren had also not been able to distinguish the so-called chóngniǔ doublets of division III finals, and treated them as type α division III finals. Li introduced the spelling -ji- for finals occurring in the fourth row of the rime tables, retaining -j- for those occurring in the third row.

Li's changes to the symbols were intended as purely notational devices, rather than suggested pronunciations.

Karlgren's spellings for open finals, which could occur in the level, rising or departing tones, are given below, with the names of their Guangyun rhyme groups, and grouped by the broad rhyme classes (攝 shè) of the rime tables. Where unrounded (kāi) and rounded (hé) finals occur in the same Guangyun rhyme group, Karlgren marked the latter with a -w- medial. Where they are split between two Guangyun rhyme groups, he marked the rounded final with a -u- medial.

Vocalic codas
Rhyme class	Division				
Rhyme class	I	II	IIIα	IIIβ	IV
果 guǒ	歌戈 -(u)â		歌戈 -j(u)â		
假 jiǎ		麻 -(w)a	麻 -ja		
遇 yù	模 -uo		魚 -jwo		
遇 yù			虞 -ju		
蟹 xiè	咍灰 -(u)ậi	皆 -(w)ăi	祭 -j(w)(i)äi		齊 -i(w)ei
蟹 xiè	泰 -(w)âi	夬 -(w)ai		廢 -j(w)ɐi	
蟹 xiè		佳 -(w)aï			
止 zhǐ			支 -j(w)(i)ĕ		
止 zhǐ			脂 -(j)(w)i		
止 zhǐ			之 -ï	微 -j(w)ĕi	
效 xiào	豪 -âu	肴 -au	宵 -j(i)äu		蕭 -ieu
流 liú	侯 -ə̆u		尤 -jə̆u		
流 liú			幽 -jiə̆u		

Finals ending in nasals -m, -n and -ng could occur in the level, rising or departing tones, with parallel finals ending in -p, -t and -k placed in the entering tone.

Nasal codas
Rhyme class	Division				
Rhyme class	I	II	IIIα	IIIβ	IV
咸 xián	談 -âm	銜 -am	鹽 -j(i)äm		添 -iem
咸 xián	覃 -ậm	咸 -ăm		嚴凡 -j(w)ɐm	
深 shēn			侵 -j(i)əm		
山 shān	寒桓 -(u)ân	刪 -(w)an		元 -j(w)ɐn	
山 shān		山 -(w)ăn	仙 -j(w)(i)än		先 -i(w)en
瑧 zhēn	痕魂 -(u)ən		臻 -jɛn	欣文 -j(u)ən	
瑧 zhēn			真諄 -j(u)(i)ĕn		
宕 dàng	唐 -(w)âng		陽 -j(w)ang		
梗 gěng		庚 -(w)ɐng		庚 -j(w)ɐng	
梗 gěng		耕 -(w)ɛng	清 -j(w)äng		青 -i(w)eng
曾 zēng	登 -(w)əng		蒸 -jəng		
通 tōng	東 -ung		東 -jung		
通 tōng	冬 -uong		鍾 -jwong		
江 jiāng		江 -ång			

Notes:
- 嚴 and 凡 are barely distinguished

=== Tones ===
The rising tone is marked with a trailing colon, the departing tone with a trailing hyphen. The level and entering tones are unmarked.

=== Coblin's revision ===
W. South Coblin made further simplifications, without sacrificing any contrasts:

- the initial ·- is written ʔ-
- the vowels ậ and ə̆ are written ə
- the vowel ĕ is written e
- the medial -u- is written -w-

== See also ==
- Baxter's transcription for Middle Chinese
