= Baxter's transcription for Middle Chinese =

Alphabetic notation for Middle Chinese phonology

William H. Baxter's transcription for Middle Chinese is an alphabetic notation recording phonological information from medieval sources, rather than a reconstruction. It was introduced by Baxter as a reference point for his reconstruction of Old Chinese phonology.

== Sources for Middle Chinese ==
The centre of the study of Chinese historical phonology is the Qieyun, a rime dictionary created by Lu Fayan in 601 CE as a guide to the proper reading of classic texts. The dictionary divided characters between the four tones, which were subdivided into 193 rhyme groups and then into homophone groups. The pronunciation of each homophone group is given by a fanqie formula, a pair of common characters respectively indicating the initial and final sounds of the syllable. Lu Fayan's work was very influential, and led to a series of expanded and corrected versions following the same structure. The most important of these was the Guangyun (1007–08), in which the number of rhyme groups was increased to 206, though without significantly changing the phonological system of the Qieyun. Since the Qieyun was thought lost until the mid-20th century, most scholarship has been based on the Guangyun, and its rhyme categories are still used. The Qing dynasty scholar Chen Li analysed the fanqie spellings of the Guangyun, determining which initial and final spellers represented the same sounds, and thus enumerating the initials and finals of the underlying system.

A series of rime tables from the Song dynasty applied a sophisticated analysis to the Qieyun system, though the language had changed over the centuries between the two. The initials were identified and categorized by place and manner of articulation. Finals were classified into 16 rhyme classes (攝 shè). Within each rhyme class, syllables were classified as either "open" (開 kāi) or "closed" (合 hé), as belonging to one of the four tones, and as belonging to one of four divisions (等 děng), indicated by rows of the table. The Qing philologists found that some of the finals of the rime dictionaries were always placed in the first row, some always in the second and some always in the fourth, and they were thus named finals of divisions I, II and IV respectively. The remaining finals were spread across the second, third and fourth rows, and were later called division III finals. The division III finals can be further subdivided on the basis of their distribution:

- Independent or pure division III finals occur only the third row of the rime tables, and occur only with labial, velar or laryngeal initials.
- Mixed division III finals occur in the second, third and fourth rows of the rime tables.
- The so-called chóngniǔ are doublets of division III finals, one occurring in the third row of the rime tables and the other in the fourth, but not distinguished in any other way. These finals also occur only with labial, velar or laryngeal initials.

== Baxter's notation ==
There have been many attempts to reconstruct the sounds or phonemes of the Qieyun system, conventionally called Early Middle Chinese, yielding a series of alphabetic transcriptions. Each of these is disputed to some extent, and many scholars doubt that the system corresponds to any single form of speech. The custom in Chinese scholarship is to neutrally describe a syllable with a string of six characters identifying its 攝 shè, whether it is 開 kāi or 合 hé, the division, tone, Guangyun rime and initial. Needing a reference point for his reconstruction of Old Chinese phonology, Baxter designed an alphabetical presentation of the same information, rather than a reconstruction. His system is a significant simplification of the Karlgren–Li reconstruction of Middle Chinese, but retains a similar structure, especially in the treatment of medials and vowels.

=== Initials ===
Baxter's transcriptions of the traditional initials are as follows:

Initials with traditional names
	stops and affricate			nasal	resonant	fricative		glide	Division
	tenuis	aspirate	voiced	nasal	resonant	tenuis	voiced	glide	Division
Labials	幫 p-	滂 ph-	並 b-	明 m-					all
Dentals	端 t-	透 th-	定 d-	泥 n-					I and IV
Lateral					來 l-				I, III and IV
Retroflex stops	知 tr-	徹 trh-	澄 dr-	娘 nr-					II and III
Dental sibilants	精 ts-	清 tsh-	從 dz-			心 s-	邪 z-		I, III and IV
Retroflex sibilants	莊 tsr-	初 tsrh-	崇 dzr-			生 sr-	俟 zr-		II and III
Palatals	章 tsy-	昌 tsyh-	禪 dzy-	日 ny-		書 sy-	船 zy-	以 y-	III
Velars	見 k-	溪 kh-	群 g-	疑 ng-					all
Laryngeals	影 ʔ-					曉 x-	匣/云 h-		all

Notes:

- -r-, -y- and -h- do not represent separate segments, but retroflex, palatalized and aspirated articulation respectively of the preceding consonant.
- The initial h- represents a voiced fricative ([ɣ] or [ɦ]) while x- represents its voiceless counterpart ([x] or [h]).
- The traditional initial 云 is the palatal allophone of h- 匣, occurring before division III finals (those containing a medial -j- or -i-), and are thus transcribed identically in Baxter's system. It can be labeled distinctly as hj-, even though not all division III finals start with -j-.
- In the rime tables, the initial hj- 云 is combined with y 以 as a single initial 喻.
- The initial ʔ- is substituted with '- (apostrophe) in the ASCII-only version

=== Finals ===
Finals with vocalic endings could occur in the level, rising or departing tones; the few that occurred only in the departing tone are marked with -H in the following table. The chóngniǔ doublets of division III finals are not distinguished in the traditional categories. Adopting a purely notational device of Li Fang-Kuei, Baxter used the spelling -ji- for finals occurring in the fourth row of the rime tables, retaining -j- for those occurring in the third row.

Vocalic codas
Rhyme class	開 kāi					合 hé				
Rhyme class	Div. I	Div. II	III mixed	III indep.	Div. IV	Div. I	Div. II	III mixed	III indep.	Div. IV
果 guǒ	歌 -a		歌 -ja			戈 -wa		戈 -jwa		
假 jiǎ		麻 -æ	麻 -jæ				麻 -wæ			
遇 yù			魚 -jo							
遇 yù	模 -u		虞 -ju							
蟹 xiè	咍 -oj	皆 -ɛj	祭 -j(i)ejH		齊 -ej	灰 -woj	皆 -wɛj	祭 -jw(i)ejH		齊 -wej
蟹 xiè		佳 -ɛɨ					佳 -wɛɨ			
蟹 xiè	泰 -ajH	夬 -æjH		廢 -jojH		泰 -wajH	夬 -wæjH		廢 -jwojH	
止 zhǐ			支 -j(i)e					支 -jw(i)e		
止 zhǐ			脂 -(j)ij					脂 -(j)wij		
止 zhǐ			之 -i	微 -jɨj					微 -jwɨj	
效 xiào	豪 -aw	肴 -æw	宵 -j(i)ew		蕭 -ew					
流 liú	侯 -uw		尤 -juw	幽 -jiw (Note: The 幽 -jiw final also occurs after a few dental and sibilant initials, where it is spelled -iw.)						

The -j- of division III finals is omitted after palatal initials, which end in -y-.

Finals ending in nasals -m, -n and -ng could occur in the level, rising or departing tones, with parallel finals ending in -p, -t and -k placed in the entering tone.

In Old Chinese: A New Reconstruction (Baxter & Sagart, 2014), the finals -ɛɨ and -wɛɨ (佳) are replaced by -ea and -wea.

Nasal codas
Rhyme class	開 kāi					合 hé				
Rhyme class	Div. I	Div. II	III mixed	III indep.	Div. IV	Div. I	Div. II	III mixed	III indep.	Div. IV
咸 xián	談 -am	銜 -æm		嚴 -jæm					凡 -jom	
咸 xián	覃 -om	咸 -ɛm	鹽 -j(i)em		添 -em					
深 shēn			侵 -(j)im							
山 shān	寒 -an	刪 -æn		元 -jon		桓 -wan	刪 -wæn		元 -jwon	
山 shān		山 -ɛn	仙 -j(i)en		先 -en		山 -wɛn	仙 -jw(i)en		先 -wen
瑧 zhēn	痕 -on		臻 -in (Note: The 臻 -in final occurs only after retroflex sibilants, and is in complementary distribution with 真 -in.)	殷 -jɨn (Note: This final is called 欣 in the Guangyun.)		魂 -won			文 -jun	
瑧 zhēn			真 -(j)in					諄 -(j)win		
宕 dàng	唐 -ang		陽 -jang			唐 -wang		陽 -jwang		
梗 gěng		庚 -æng		庚 -jæng			庚 -wæng		庚 -jwæng	
梗 gěng		耕 -ɛng	清 -jieng (Note: The 清 -jieng final is spelled -jeng after dental and sibilant initials.)		青 -eng		耕 -wɛng	清 -jwieng		青 -weng
曾 zēng	登 -ong		蒸 -ing			登 -wong		蒸 -wing		
通 tōng	東 -uwng		東 -juwng							
通 tōng	冬 -owng		鍾 -jowng							
江 jiāng		江 -æwng								

The vowels æ, ɛ and ɨ are spelled ⟨ae⟩, ⟨ea⟩ and ⟨+⟩ in the ASCII transcription of the Baxter system.

=== Tones ===
The rising tone is marked with a trailing X, the departing tone with a trailing H. The level and entering tones are unmarked.
