= Historical Chinese phonology =

Historical Chinese phonology deals with reconstructing the sounds of historical varieties of Chinese. Since Chinese is written with logographic characters rather than alphabetically or with a syllabary, the methods employed in Historical Chinese phonology differ considerably from those employed in other language families such as the Indo-European languages, due to the lack of recorded pronunciations.

Chinese is documented over a long period of time, with the earliest oracle bone writings dated to c. 1250 BC. However, since the writing is mostly with logographic characters, which do not directly specify the phonology of the language, reconstruction is generally quite difficult, and depends to a large extent on auxiliary sources that more directly document the language's phonology. On the basis of these sources, historical Chinese is divided into the following basic periods:

- Old Chinese, broadly from about 1250 BC to 25 AD, when the Han dynasty came back to power after the Xin dynasty. More narrowly, reconstructed "Old Chinese" is based on the rhymes of early poetry such as the Shijing and the phonological components of Chinese characters, and is assumed to represent the language of c. 1000–700 BC.
- Eastern Han Chinese (25–220AD) is widely considered to be the middle ground between Old Chinese and Middle Chinese, as well as being the ancestor of Proto-Min. It is attested from texts such as the Shiming, the Shuowen Jiezi, commentaries on the Chinese classics, and Buddhist works transcribed, translated and/or glossed into Chinese.
- Middle Chinese, broadly from about the 5th century AD (Northern and Southern dynasties, Sui, Tang, Song) through to 12th century AD. More narrowly, reconstructed "Middle Chinese" is usually based on the detailed phonetic evidence of the Qieyun rime dictionary (601 AD), later expanded into the Guangyun. The Qieyun describes a compromise between the northern and southern varieties, and such rhyming dictionaries were essential to write and read aloud poetry with a rhyming pattern.
- Modern varieties, from about the 13th century AD (in the beginning of the Yuan dynasty, in which Early Mandarin was developed) to the present. Most modern varieties appear to have split off from a Late Middle Chinese koine from around 800 AD (with the exception of Min around 100 AD and Wu around 500 AD).

== Overview ==
Middle Chinese had a structure much like many modern varieties, with largely monosyllabic words, little or no derivational morphology, four tone-classes (though three phonemic tones), and a syllable structure consisting of an initial consonant, glide, main vowel and final consonant, with a large number of initial consonants and a fairly small number of final consonants. Aside from the glide, no clusters could occur at the beginning or end of a syllable.

Old Chinese, on the other hand, had a significantly different structure. Most scholars have concluded that there were no tones, a lesser imbalance between possible initial and final consonants, and a significant number of initial and final clusters. There was a well-developed system of derivational and possibly inflectional morphology, formed using consonants added onto the beginning or end of a syllable. This system is similar to the system reconstructed for Proto-Sino-Tibetan and still visible, for example, in the written Tibetan language; it is also largely similar to the system that occurs in the more conservative Mon–Khmer languages, such as modern Khmer (Cambodian).

The main changes leading to the modern varieties have been a reduction in the number of consonants and vowels and a corresponding increase in the number of tones (typically through a pan-East-Asiatic tone split that doubled the number of tones while eliminating the distinction between voiced and unvoiced consonants). This has led to a gradual decrease in the number of possible syllables. In Standard Mandarin, this has progressed to a farther extent than elsewhere, with only about 1,200 possible syllables. The result, in Mandarin especially, has been the proliferation of the number of two-syllable compound words, which have steadily replaced former monosyllabic words, to the extent that the majority of words in Standard Mandarin are now composed of two syllables.

== Periodization of Chinese ==
The terms "Old Chinese" and "Middle Chinese" refer to long periods of time in and of themselves, during which significant changes occurred. Although there is no standard system for subdividing these periods, the following is an approximate chronology leading from the oldest writings in the oracle bone script up through modern Standard Mandarin:

1. Axel Schuessler uses the term Early Zhou Chinese to refer to the language from the earliest records down to the end of the Western Zhou period (c. 1250 to 771 BC).
2. W. A. C. H. Dobson uses the term Early Archaic Chinese to refer to the same period ("10th to 9th century BC"), although Schuessler suggests that the term should refer to a slightly later period.
3. Dobson uses the term Late Archaic Chinese to refer to the "4th to 3rd century BC"; that is, the period near the beginning of the Han dynasty.
4. Late Han Chinese (LHC) is c. 200 AD. This is around the time that Min Chinese varieties diverged from the others.
5. Old Northwest Chinese (ONWC), c. 400 AD, is a reconstruction by Weldon South Coblin of the language of the northwestern Chinese provinces of Gansu and Shaanxi that is immediately ancestral to a set of northwestern dialects documented by various early Tang dynasty authors.
6. Early Middle Chinese (EMC), c. 600 AD, is the language of the Qieyun rime dictionary, the first stage for which we have direct and detailed phonetic evidence. This evidence is not enough by itself to directly determine the sound system of the language, however, as it only subdivides characters into an initial consonant and non-initial portion, without further decomposing the latter into phonemes.
7. Late Middle Chinese (LMC), c. 1000 AD, is the native language of the authors of the Yunjing rime table and the oldest stage that can be reconstructed from modern non-Min varieties by the comparative method.
8. Early Mandarin, c. 1300 AD (sometimes specifically given as 1269–1455. The Yuan dynasty conquered the whole of China in 1279 and was overpowered by the Ming dynasty in 1368), was the language inferred in the 'Phags-pa script, the first alphabetic writing system for Chinese. It is also documented in the Zhōngyuán Yīnyùn (中原音韻 "Sounds and Rhymes of the Central Plains", an opera manual of 1324 AD written by Zhou Deqing).
9. Middle Mandarin, up through c. 1800 (sometimes specifically given as 1455–1795), documented in numerous Chinese, Korean and European sources. Among these are Chinese-Korean pedagogical texts such as Hongmu Chôngyun Yôkhun (1455) and Sasông T’onghae (1517); the Portuguese-Chinese dictionary (1583–1588) of the Christian missionaries Matteo Ricci and Michele Ruggieri; a dictionary by a friar, Basilio Brollo (1692-1694), also known as Basile da Glemona, a grammar of Mandarin by Francisco Varo (1703) and Chinese rhyme manuals such as the Yunlüe Huitong (1642).
10. Modern Standard Chinese, a standardized form of the dialect of Beijing that is little changed from the 19th century. It was promulgated during the Republic of China in 1932. Today, it is the standard variety in the PRC, founded by Mao Zedong in 1949.

== Chinese native phonological traditions ==
A native tradition of Chinese phonology developed in the Middle Chinese period. Chinese linguists had long compiled dictionaries and attempted to identify the pronunciation of difficult characters by specifying homophone characters. During the early centuries AD, however, the more advanced method of fanqie was developed, which allowed the pronunciation of any syllable to be specified unambiguously by using one character to indicate the initial consonant and another to indicate the remainder. By the sixth century AD, systematic attempts were made to compile lists of all characters and specify their pronunciation by way of fanqie, culminating in rime dictionaries such as the Qieyun (601 AD).

During the next few centuries, the increasing influence of Buddhism and Buddhist scholars brought Chinese linguists in touch with the tradition of Sanskrit grammar, which included a highly advanced understanding of phonology and phonetics, including a system of analyzing sounds by distinctive features, such as place of articulation and type of phonation. This led to rime tables such as the Yunjing (c. 1150 AD), a sophisticated analysis of the sound system of the Qieyun.

During the Qing dynasty (1644–1912), scholars such as Duan Yucai diligently studied the sound system of Middle and Old Chinese. Through careful examination of rime tables, rime dictionaries and patterns of rhyming among poets of various eras, these scholars were able to work out the system of categories of rhymes in Old Chinese, and discover additional Middle Chinese categories that had previously been overlooked. However, progress in Chinese linguistics was seriously hampered by the lack of any concept of a phoneme — i.e. a basic unit of sound, including vowels and vowel-like segments as well as consonants. This made it impossible to go beyond determination of systems of rhyming categories to reconstruction of the actual sounds involved.

In some ways, the lack of native Chinese development of the concept of a unit of sound is surprising, as it had already been developed by Sanskrit grammarians such as Pāṇini by the 4th century BC at the latest, and the phonological analysis of the Yunjing shows a close familiarity with the tradition of Sanskrit grammar. Furthermore, some non-Chinese writing systems within the Chinese cultural orbit, such as the Korean script and especially the Tibetan script, were developed under the close influence of Indian writing systems and have the concept of phoneme directly embedded in them. (Furthermore, the 'Phags-pa script, an alphabetic script of Tibetan origin, had been used to write Chinese itself during the Mongolian Yuan dynasty, c. 1270–1360, although it later fell out of use.) It seems likely, however, that

1. The strong influence and long tradition of Chinese writing, which included no concept of an alphabet and always treated the rhyming part of a syllable as a single unit, made it difficult to independently develop the concept of a unit of sound.
2. Lack of knowledge of Sanskrit by most Chinese scholars precluded direct reading of the original works on Sanskrit grammar.
3. Cultural attitudes that treated Koreans, Tibetans, Mongolians and most other foreigners as "barbarians" made it difficult for scientific knowledge from these cultures to diffuse into China.

== Modern methods of reconstruction ==
As a result, the first reconstructions of the actual sound systems of Old and Middle Chinese were only done in the early 20th century, by Swedish sinologist Bernhard Karlgren. Armed with his knowledge of Western historical linguistics, he performed field work in China between 1910 and 1912, creating a list of 3,100 Chinese characters and collecting phonological data on the pronunciation of these characters in 19 Mandarin dialects as well as the dialects of Shanghai (Wu), Fuzhou (Eastern Min), and Guangdong (Cantonese). He combined this with the Sino-Japanese and Sino-Vietnamese pronunciations as well as previously published material on nine other dialects, along with the fanqie analysis of the Guangyun rime dictionary (a later version of the Qieyun of 601 AD). In 1915, he published his reconstruction of Middle Chinese, which underlies in one form or another all subsequent reconstructions. Walter Simon and Henri Maspero also made great contributions in the field during the early days of its development. Karlgren himself had no direct access to the Qieyun, which was thought lost; however, fragments of the Qieyun were discovered in the Dunhuang Caves in the 1930s, and a nearly complete copy was discovered in 1947 in the Palace Museum.

Karlgren was also instrumental in early reconstruction of Old Chinese. His early work on Middle Chinese made various suggestions about Old Chinese, and a detailed reconstruction appeared in Grammata Serica (1940), a dictionary of Middle and Old Chinese reconstructions. An expanded version, Grammata Serica Recensa, was published in 1957 and is still a commonly cited source.

The reconstruction of Middle Chinese draws its data (in approximate order of importance) from:

- Rime dictionaries and rime tables of the Middle Chinese era, such as the Qieyun (601 AD) and Yunjing (c. 1150 AD).
- Modern Chinese speaking variants such as Yue, Hakka, Mandarin, Min, Wu etc.
- Sino-Xenic data — Chinese loanwords borrowed in large numbers into Vietnamese, Japanese and Korean, especially during the period of 500–1000 AD. This large-scale borrowing led to the so-called Sino-Vietnamese, Sino-Japanese and Sino-Korean vocabularies of these languages.
- Other early cases of Chinese words borrowed into foreign languages or transcribed in foreign sources, e.g. Sanskrit works in India.
- Early cases of transliteration of foreign words from other languages such as Sanskrit and Tibetan into Chinese.
- Chinese written in the 'Phags-pa script, a brief period (c. 1270–1360) when Chinese was written in an alphabetic script.
- Transcriptions of Chinese by foreigners, especially the Hangul transcriptions of Koreans such as Sin Sukchu (15th century) and works by various Christian missionaries and other Westerners, the oldest of which is Matteo Ricci's Portuguese–Chinese dictionary of 1583–1588. (Although these transcriptions, as well as the 'Phags-pa evidence, are significant in providing extensive documentation of earlier forms of Mandarin Chinese, their importance for reconstructing Middle Chinese pales in comparison with the much greater breadth provided by the pronunciation of Chinese variants and Sino-Xenic languages, despite their later attestation.)

Karlgren suggested that the Middle Chinese documented in the Qieyun was a live language of the Sui-Tang period. Today, with direct access to the Qieyun, this notion has been replaced by the view that the sound system in the Qieyun represents (or proposes) a literate reading adopted by the literate class of the period throughout the country, not any live language that once existed. For example, in some cases a former three-way distinction A, B, C among initials or finals gave way to a situation where one dialect group of the Qieyun period merged AB vs. C, while another group merged A vs. BC. In these cases, the Qieyun specifies A, B, C as all distinct, even though no living dialect of the time period made such a three-way distinction, and any earlier dialect that did make this distinction would have differed in other ways from the Qieyun system.

The reconstruction of Old Chinese is more controversial than that of Middle Chinese since it has to be extrapolated from the Middle Chinese data. Phonological information concerning Old Chinese is chiefly gained from:

- The rhymed texts written before the Qin dynasty, chiefly the Shijing, the earliest anthology of Chinese poetry.
- The fact that characters sharing the same phonetic component had very similar pronunciations when the characters were first created.
- Comparison of Old Chinese with other Sino-Tibetan dialects.

== Old Chinese phonology ==
There are disagreements over exactly what the Old Chinese (OC) syllable looked like. The following is an approximate consensus, based on the system of William Baxter and (earlier) Li Fang-Kuei:

1. A syllable consisted of an initial consonant, an optional medial glide /r/ (but no /j/ or /w/), a main vowel, an optional final (coda) consonant, and an optional post-final consonant /s/ or /ʔ/. There were also various pre-initial consonants. (In recent systems, Baxter also constructs a distinction between "tightly bound" pre-initials /C-/ and "loosely bound" pre-initials /Cə/. The tightly bound pre-initials interact in complex ways with the initial to produce EMC initials, but the loosely bound pre-initials mostly just disappear. Their presence, however, is revealed by the use of a "phonetic complement" with the corresponding tightly bound pre-initial in their character, and sometimes by early borrowings into other languages, especially Hmong–Mien languages and Tai languages.) Pre-initial and post-final consonants were frequently used in morphological derivation.
2. There was no MC-style tone, but there was a distinction of some sort between type-A and type-B syllables. Depending on the linguist, the distinction is variously thought to reflect either presence or absence of prefixes, an accentual or length distinction on the main vowel, or some sort of register distinction (e.g. pharyngealization of the initial consonant in type-A syllables). These different reconstructions may not be mutually exclusive (e.g. an earlier prefix distinction may have developed into a later register distinction).
3. Compared with EMC, there were no palatal or retroflex consonants, but there were labiovelar consonants (e.g. /kʷ/). Baxter also reconstructs voiceless resonants, e.g. /m̥/, /n̥/.
4. There were on the order of six main vowels: /a/, /i/, /e/, /o/, /u/, /ə/ (or /ɨ/).
5. The system of final (coda) consonants was similar to EMC; however, there was no /wŋ/. Baxter also reconstructs final /r/, later becoming /n/.

== From Old Chinese to Early Middle Chinese ==
=== Initial consonants ===
==== Palatalisation of velar initials ====
William H. Baxter pointed out that some of the words that were reconstructed with Middle Chinese palatal initials were perhaps words that had velar initials in Old Chinese. For example, Baxter indicated that 熱, reconstructed as nyet in Middle Chinese, was perhaps pronounced as ngjet in Old Chinese. He noted the distinction between 支 (tsye), which had a MC palatal initial, and 技, which had a velar initial in MC (gjeX, III), despite their common phonetic component. Some modern Min and Hakka varieties nonetheless retain velar initials in both. The two are reconstructed by Baxter to be kje and grjeʔ respectively in Old Chinese. Baxter posited that the medial -rj- cluster had blocked palatalisation.

==== Lenition of OC /ɡ/ ====
The voiced velar plosive, *ɡ, was lenited to a voiced fricative (*ɣ~ɦ) during this development from Old Chinese to Middle Chinese. According to Laurent Sagart, this change is reflected when the Old Chinese plosive occurred in type A syllables. This is supported by Baxter's observation that modern Min dialects show a difference in pronunciation between 厚 and 後, both of which belong to the Middle Chinese 匣 initial (reconstructed as *ɣ~ɦ). For the first character, the Fuzhou dialect, Amoy Hokkien and the Teochew dialect, show pronunciations with a velar plosive (*k-). This pronunciation is consistent with an earlier pronunciation with a velar plosive, most likely the Old Chinese *ɡ. The second character is pronounced by these dialects with a null initial, possibly reflecting a voiced laryngeal in Old Chinese. The OC *ɡ remained intact in Type B syllables, which correspond to Division III Middle Chinese words.

==== Retroflex initials ====
The loss of the reconstructed OC medial "r", or the r-infix in Sagart's reconstruction, had not only influenced vowel quality in Middle Chinese but had also caused the retroflexion of coronal consonants.

==== Sonorant fortition ====
Both Baxter and Sagart have pointed out that Old Chinese had a series of voiceless sonorants, which typically do not occur in most modern varieties. These voiceless sonorants are *hm /m̥/, *hn /n̥/, *hng /ŋ̊/, *hngw /ŋ̊ʷ/, *hl /l̥/, and possibly *hr /r̥/. Their reflexes in Middle Chinese are postulated to be:

Old Chinese voiceless sonorants and corresponding Middle Chinese reflexes
OC sonorant	MC reflex (Note: (j) corresponds to developments from a Type B syllable. The MC palatal sibilant reflex sy is only found in Type B syllables.)
*hm-	x(w)-, x(w)j-
*hn-	th-, thr(j)-, sy-
*hng-	x(j)-
*hngw-	xw(j)-
*hl-	th-, sy-, thr(j)-
*hr-	x-(?), thrj-, th(r)-

Additionally, the OC lateral consonant /*l/ is shown to have fortified to a coronal plosive /d/ in Type A syllables. Meanwhile, it developed into /j/ in Type B syllables, which palatalised in Middle Chinese. Sagart pointed out, however, that these changes are not true if the lateral is preceded by a reconstructed prefix. This position, whereby OC /l/ underwent fortition to become a plosive, is upheld by Baxter. Baxter pointed out xiesheng contacts between plosive series, sibilants and MC y-, and made the following reconstructions:

脫	tuō	<	thwat	<	*hlot	'take off clothes'
兌	duì	<	dwaj^{H}	<	*los < *lots	'glad'
說	shuō	<	sywet	<	*hljot	'speak', 'explain'
悅	yuè	<	jwet	<	*ljot	'pleased', 'glad'

Note that these reconstructions included voiceless sonorants, of which the developments have been consistent with their fortition and reflexes.

According to Sagart, this fortition was impeded if the lateral was preceded by an unspecified consonant or minor syllable. He reconstructs 林 as *Cə-lim, yielding MC lim. Furthermore, MC /l/ was said to have derived from an OC /*r/.

=== Medials and finals ===
The following are the main developments that produced Early Middle Chinese (EMC) from Old Chinese (OC):

- Type-B syllables developed a /j/ glide. This glide combined with a previous coronal consonant to produce new palatal consonants. It also sometimes turned a preceding velar or laryngeal into a palatal sibilant and/or raised a following main vowel. (Contrarily, type-A syllables often lowered a following main vowel, with a high vowel diphthongizing, e.g. /i/ becoming /ej/.)
- The /r/ glide eventually disappeared, but before doing this it turned a previous coronal consonant into a retroflex consonant, and fronted (and often centralized) a following main vowel.
- Changes to final consonants: /r/ became /n/; /j/ dropped after /a/; /k/ dropped before /s/; /t/ before /s/ became /j/ (which remained, even after /a/).
- Tones developed from the former suffixes (post-final consonants), with MC tone 3 ("departing", reconstructed as having falling pitch) developing from /s/, tone 2 ("rising", reconstructed as having rising pitch) developing from /ʔ/, and tone 1 ("level", reconstructed as having level pitch) from other syllables. As the suffixes were part of the derivational morphology of OC, this often produced MC tonal variation, either in a single word or in semantically related words.
- Back vowels /o/ and /u/, when followed by a coronal consonant (/j/, /n/, /r/, /t/), broke into /w/ plus a front vowel.
- Labiovelar initials were reanalyzed as a velar followed a /w/ glide, which merged with /w/ from breaking of /o/ and /u/.
- The main vowel developed in various complicated ways, depending on the surrounding sounds. For example, in type-A syllables, according to Baxter's reconstruction, OC /ɨj/ became /-ɛj/ after /r/; otherwise, /-ej/ after coronal initials, /-oj/ after velar initials, and /-woj/ after labial initials. In type-B syllables, however, OC /ɨj/ became /-ij/ after /r/ or coronal initial, but /-jɨj/ otherwise.

Note that OC type-B syllables correspond closely to division-III, and (in Baxter's reconstruction at least) to EMC syllables with /i/ or /j/.

== From Early Middle Chinese to Late Middle Chinese ==
To a large degree, Late Middle Chinese (LMC) of c. 1000 AD can be viewed as the direct ancestor of all Chinese varieties except Min Chinese; in other words, attempting to reconstruct the parent language of all varieties excluding Min leads no farther back than LMC. See below for more information.

Exactly which changes occurred between EMC and LMC depends on whose system of EMC and/or LMC reconstruction is used. In the following, Baxter's EMC reconstruction is compared to Pulleyblank's LMC reconstruction. To the extent that these two systems reflect reality, they may be significantly farther apart than the 400 or so years normally given between EMC and LMC, since Baxter's EMC system was designed to harmonize with Old Chinese while Pulleyblank's LMC system was designed to harmonize with later Mandarin developments. Furthermore, Baxter considers all the distinctions of the Qieyun to be real, while many of them are clearly anachronisms that no longer applied to any living form of the language in 600 AD. Finally, some of the resulting "changes" may not be actual changes at all so much as conceptual differences in the way the systems have been reconstructed; these are noted below.

Changes mostly involve initials, medials, and main vowels.

- The class of EMC palatals is lost, with palatal sibilants becoming retroflex sibilants and the palatal nasal becoming a new phoneme /ɻ/.
- A new class of labiodentals emerges, from EMC labials followed by /j/ and an EMC back vowel.
- EMC complex medial /jw/ becomes /y/ [ɥ], producing a six-way medial distinction between none, /i/, /ji/, /w/, /y/, /jy/. The phonemic glides /i/ and /y/ are vocalic [i] and [y] before short vowels /a/ and /ə/, but semivocalic [j] and [ɥ] before long vowel /aː/.
- The eight-way EMC distinction in main vowels is significantly modified, developing into a system with high vowels /i/, /y/, /u/ and (marginally) /ɨ/, and non-high vowels /a/, /ə/, /aː/. However, this is best analyzed as a system with a four-way main vowel distinction between no vowel and the three phonemic vowels /a/, /ə/, /aː/; high vowels are then analyzed as phonemically consisting of a medial and no main vowel (/ɨ/ is phonemically a syllable containing only a bare consonant, with no medial and no main vowel).
- High front medials/main vowels /i/ and /y/ are lost after EMC retroflex sibilants, prior to merging with palatals; contrarily, a /j/ sometimes appears after guttural consonants.

Few changes to final consonants occur; the main ones are the loss of /j/ after a high vowel, the disappearance of /ɨ/ (which might or might not be reckoned as a final consonant) in the rhyme /-ɛɨ/, and (potentially) the appearance of /jŋ/ and /jk/ (which are suspect in various ways; see below).

The tones do not change phonemically. However, allophonically they evidently split into a higher-pitched allophone in syllables with voiceless initials, and a lower-pitched allophone in syllables with voiced initials. All modern Chinese varieties reflect such a split, which produces a new set of phonemic tones in most varieties due to later loss of voicing distinctions.

The following changes are in approximate order.

=== Labiodentalization ===
Early Middle Chinese (EMC) labials (/p, pʰ, b, m/) become Late Middle Chinese (LMC) labiodentals (/f, f, bv, ʋ/, possibly from earlier affricates) in certain circumstances involving a following glide. When this happens, the glide disappears. Using Baxter's reconstruction, the triggering circumstances can be expressed simply as whenever a labial is followed by a glide /j/ and the main vowel is a back vowel; other reconstructions word the rule differently. According to Baxter, however, labiodentalization might have occurred independently of each other in different areas. For example, some variants retain OC /m/ before the glide, while in other variants, it had developed into a labiodental initial (微): compare Cantonese 文 man^{4} and Mandarin 文 wén.

=== Vowel changes and mergers ===
In approximate order:

a. Some early changes

1. /-e-/ (without medial /j/) becomes /-jie-/ after labial, velar and glottal consonants, /-ie-/ elsewhere. (Along with certain later changes, this means that, synchronically, an LMC speaker cannot distinguish original Division IV syllables from original III-4 chongniu syllables; likewise for Division III vs. III-3 chongniu. This explains why these chongniu pairs end up in grades 3 and 4, respectively.) A change of this sort occurs in all modern reconstructions of EMC and LMC, and is responsible for the creation of Division IV.
2. /ŋ/ and /k/ after a non-high front vowel (/æ/, /ɛ/, /e/) become /jŋ/ and /jk/ (often viewed as palatalized final consonants). This may not be a real change; Pulleyblank's EMC system already includes /jŋ/ and /jk/, whereas they are not present in any modern dialect. The most direct evidence for these sounds comes from Sino-Vietnamese vocabulary, which was borrowed from LMC and does reflect the sounds. In Pulleyblank's LMC system, /jŋ/ only occurs in the rhymes /-aːjŋ/ and /-iajŋ/, which contrast with /-aŋ/ and /-iaŋ/; likewise for /-jk/. (/-a-/ and /-aː-/ do not contrast before velar finals, except possibly after EMC retroflex sibilants.) These contrasts would be reflected in some other way in a system without /-jŋ/ and /-jk/.
3. The sequence /-ɛɨ/ merges into /-ɛj/. In some dialects, however, it instead remains separate (perhaps in the form /-ɛ/, not otherwise occurring in Baxter's system). According to Abraham Y.S. Chan, the former change was characteristic of the Luoyang dialect, while the latter reflected the Jinling dialect. The distinction between the two surfaces in Standard Mandarin as a respective distinction between ai and ya, or pai/pei and pa.

b. Mergers of high-front finals

1. EMC finals /je/, /ij/, /i/, /jɨj/ merge into /i/; likewise /jɨ-/ (which occurs before /n/ and /t/) becomes /i-/.
2. The hekou equivalents of the above (with additional medial /w/) become /yj/.
3. The III-4 chongniu equivalents of both of the above become /ji/ and /jyj/, respectively.

c. Changes involving high back vowels, mostly generating /ə/

1. EMC final /u/ becomes /uə/; likewise, /ju/ becomes /juə/. (Possibly not a real change.)
2. The EMC sequence /-uw-/ becomes /-əw-/, and /-jow-/ becomes /-yw-/.
3. All remaining /-o-/, except in the sequences /-oj/ and /-om/, become /ə/.
4. All non-final /-jə-/ become /-i-/, and /-wə-/ become /-u-/.

d. Changes involving non-high vowels

1. When there is no medial /j/, remaining /-æ-/ and /-ɛ-/ become /-aː-/.
2. All remaining /-æ-/, /-e-/, /-ɛ-/, /-o-/ become /-a-/.

e. Changes involving medials

1. Non-final /-jwi-/ and /-wji-/ become /-jy-/, while /-jw-, wj-, -wi-, -ju-/ become /-y-/.
2. The medials /-i-/ and /-j-/ merge into a single phoneme, with /-i-/ occurring before /-a-/ and /-ə-/, and /-j-/ elsewhere (before /-aː-/ and high vowels). Medial /-u-/ and /-w-/ merge in the same way.

f. Medial and similar changes triggered by specific initials

1. /j/ appears between a guttural consonant (velar or laryngeal) and a directly following /-aː-/. This sets the stage for palatalized syllables in Standard Mandarin such as jia and xian.
2. A final /i/ directly following a dental sibilant becomes /ɨ/ (presumably [z̩]).
3. After an EMC retroflex sibilant, a directly following high-front vowel or glide (/i/ or /j/, along with front-rounded /y/ or /ɥ/, if reconstructed) is removed, specifically:
  1. A glide /j/ is lost.
  2. A main vowel /i/ becomes /ə/ if non-final.
  3. A main vowel /i/ becomes /ɨ/ (presumably [ʐ̩]) if final.
  4. If high front-rounded vocalics are reconstructed, they unround (/y/ -> /u/, /ɥ/ -> /j/).

=== Late changes to initial consonants ===
- EMC palatals become retroflex, with palatal sibilants merging with retroflex sibilants and palatal /ɲ/ becoming a new phoneme /ɻ/ (still reflected as such in Standard Mandarin).
- Voiced consonants are thought to have become breathy voiced. This is a non-phonemic change; it is postulated to account for the breathy-voiced consonants still present in Wu Chinese, and the common outcome elsewhere of originally voiced consonants as unvoiced aspirates. Karlgren reconstructed breathy voicing for EMC as well, but this is no longer thought to be the case due to lack of any evidence for it in borrowings to or from EMC (especially involving Sanskrit and Middle Indic languages, which had a distinction between normally voiced and breathy-voiced consonants). This may have occurred to differing extents in different places:
  - Among the two Chinese varieties that have not merged voiced and unvoiced consonants, Wu reflects the EMC voiced consonants as breathy voiced, but Old Xiang reflects them as normally voiced.
  - Gan and Hakka reflect all EMC voiced consonants as unvoiced aspirates, but many others (e.g. Mandarin) only have such aspirated consonants in syllables within the yang ping tone, the light-level tone. Similarly, many words in Hokkien Min that are read with the yang ping tone are unaspirated, developing from Old Chinese and Middle Chinese voiced initials. Some words have aspirated readings, however, which led some linguists to believe that there may be a voiced aspirated series in the Proto-Min language, which had branched off from Old Chinese before it developed into Middle Chinese.

== From Late Middle Chinese to Standard Mandarin ==
=== Initials ===
- Voiced stops and sibilants were devoiced; the stops became aspirated in syllables with tone 1 and unaspirated otherwise.
- Retroflex stops merged into retroflex affricates.
- Sonorants: retroflex nasal merged into alveolar nasal; /ɻ/, formerly palatal nasal in EMC, became /ɻ~ʐ/ or sometimes the syllable er; velar nasal was dropped.
- Before high front vowel or glide, velars ("back-tooth" stops and "throat" fricatives) and alveolar sibilants palatalized and merged as a new series of alveolo-palatal sibilants.
- The glottal stop /ʔ/ was dropped; before a high front glide, the voiced velar fricative /ɣʰ/ was dropped.
- Labiodentals: /v/, devoiced, merged into /f/; /ʋ/ became /w/. (LMC labiodentals resulted from EMC labials preceding /j/ + back vowel.)

The following table illustrates the evolution of initials from Early Middle Chinese, through Late Middle Chinese, to Standard Mandarin.

Mapping of EMC, LMC, and Standard Mandarin initials
EMC	LMC	Old Mandarin	Modern Standard Mandarin
/m/	/m/	/m/	/m/
/m/	/ɱ/ before /j/ followed by back vowel	/v/	/w/
/n/	/n/	/n/	/n/
/ɳ/	/ɳ/	/n/	/n/
/ɲ/	/ɲ/	/ʒ/	/ʐ~ɻ/ or syllable [əɻ]
/ŋ/	/ŋ/	dropped or /n/	dropped or /n/
/l/	/l/	/l/	/l/
/p/, /pʰ/, /b/	/p/, /pʰ/, /bʰ/	/p/, /pʰ/	/p/, /pʰ/
/p/, /pʰ/, /b/	/f/, /v/ before /j/ followed by back vowel	/f/	/f/
/t/, /tʰ/, /d/	/t/, /tʰ/, /dʰ/	/t/, /tʰ/	/t/, /tʰ/
/ʈ/, /ʈʰ/, /ɖ/	/ʈ/, /ʈʰ/, /ɖʰ/	/ʈʂ/, /ʈʂʰ/	/ʈʂ/, /ʈʂʰ/
/tʃ/, /tʃʰ/, /dʒ/	/ʈʂ/, /ʈʂʰ/, /ɖʐʰ/	/ʈʂ/, /ʈʂʰ/	/ʈʂ/, /ʈʂʰ/
/tɕ/, /tɕʰ/, /dʑ/	/tɕ/, /tɕʰ/, /dʑ/	/ʈʂ/, /ʈʂʰ/	/ʈʂ/, /ʈʂʰ/
/ts/, /tsʰ/, /dz/	/ts/, /tsʰ/, /dzʰ/	/ts/, /tsʰ/	/ts/, /tsʰ/
/ts/, /tsʰ/, /dz/	/ts/, /tsʰ/, /dzʰ/	/ts/, /tsʰ/	/tɕ/, /tɕʰ/ before /i/, /y/, or /j/
/k/, /kʰ/, /ɡ/	/k/, /kʰ/, /ɡʰ/	/tɕ/, /tɕʰ/ before /i/, /y/, or /j/	/tɕ/, /tɕʰ/
/k/, /kʰ/, /ɡ/	/k/, /kʰ/, /ɡʰ/	/k/, /kʰ/	/k/, /kʰ/
/ʃ/, /ʒ/	/ʂ/, /ʐ/	/ʂ/	/ʂ/
/ɕ/, /ʑ/	/ɕ/, /ʑ/	/ʂ/	/ʂ/
/s/, /z/	/s/, /zʰ/	/s/	/s/
/s/, /z/	/s/, /zʰ/	/s/	/ɕ/ before /i/, /y/, or /j/
/x/, /ɣ/	/x/, /ɣʰ/ or dropped before /j/	/ɕ/ before /i/, /y/, or /j/	/ɕ/
/x/, /ɣ/	/x/, /ɣʰ/ or dropped before /j/	/x/	/x/
/ʔ/	/ʔ/	dropped	dropped

=== Finals ===
In general, Mandarin preserves the LMC system of medials and main vowels fairly well (better than most other varieties) but drastically reduces the system of codas (final consonants). The systematic changes to medials and main vowels are loss of the chongniu distinctions i/ji and y/jy (which occur in all modern varieties) and loss of the distinction between /a/ and /aː/. All final stop consonants are lost, and final nasals are reduced to a distinction between /n/ and /ŋ/.

The exact changes involving finals are somewhat complex and not always predictable, in that in many circumstances there are multiple possible outcomes. The following is a basic summary; more information can be found in the table of EMC finals in Middle Chinese.

Changes to medials:

- LMC medial classes /ji/ and /i/ merge, losing the /j/; likewise for /jy/ and /y/.
- LMC front medials /i/ and /y/ (and corresponding main vowels) are lost after retroflex consonants. The operation of this change is exactly as for the similar change that occurred after EMC retroflexes. The difference between EMC retroflex and palatal sibilants is sometimes reflected in Mandarin, for example between she (EMC retroflex) and shi (EMC palatal).
- LMC medial /u/ is lost after labials, and /y/ unrounds to /i/.
- LMC medial /u/ is sometimes lost after /l/ and /n/.
- Various other changes occur after particular initials.

Changes to main vowels:

- Long vowel /aː/ shortens.
- Various other complex changes; see Middle Chinese.

Changes to codas:

- LMC coda /m/ becomes /n/.
- LMC stop codas /p,t,k/ are dropped, with /k/ sometimes becoming /j/ and /w/.
- LMC complex codas /wŋ/ and /wk/ become simple codas; likewise for /jŋ/ and /jk/, but often with effects on the preceding vowel.

=== Tones ===
A tone split occurs as a result of the loss of the voicing distinction in initial consonants. The split tones then merge back together except for Middle Chinese tone 1; hence Middle Chinese tones 1,2,3 become Mandarin tones 1,2,3,4. (Some syllables with original Mandarin tone 3 move to tone 4; see below.) Syllables with a final stop consonant, originally toneless, get assigned to one of the four modern tones; for syllables with Middle Chinese unvoiced initials, this happens in a completely random fashion.

The specific relationship between Middle Chinese and modern tones:

V− = unvoiced initial consonant (全清 quánqīng or 次清 cìqīng)
L = sonorant initial consonant (次濁 cìzhuó)
V+ = voiced initial consonant (not sonorant) (全濁 quánzhuó)

Middle Chinese	Tone	Ping (平)			Shang (上)			Qu (去)			Ru (入)		
Middle Chinese	Initial	V−	L	V+	V−	L	V+	V−	L	V+	V−	L	V+
Standard Chinese	Tone name	Yin Ping (陰平, 1)	Yang Ping (陽平, 2)		Shang (上, 3)		Qu (去, 4)				redistributed with no pattern	to Qu	to Yang Ping
Standard Chinese	Tone contour	55	35		214		51				redistributed with no pattern	to 51	to 35

== Branching off of the modern varieties ==
Most modern Chinese varieties can be viewed as descendants of Late Middle Chinese (LMC) of c. 1000 AD. For example, all modern varieties other than Min Chinese have labiodental fricatives (e.g. /f/), a change that occurred after Early Middle Chinese (EMC) of c. 600 AD. In fact, some post-LMC changes are reflected in all modern varieties, such as the loss of the chongniu distinction (between e.g. /pian/ and /pjian/, using Edwin Pulleyblank's transcription). Other changes occurring in most modern varieties, such as the loss of initial voiced obstruents and corresponding tone split, are areal changes that spread across existing dialects; possibly the loss of chongniu distinctions can be viewed in the same way.

Min Chinese, on the other hand, is known to have branched off even before Early Middle Chinese (EMC) of c. 600 AD. Not only does it not reflect the development of labiodental fricatives or other LMC-specific changes, but a number of features already present in EMC appear never developed. An example is the series of retroflex stops in EMC, which developed from earlier alveolar stops followed by /r/, and which later merged with retroflex sibilants. In Min, the corresponding words still have alveolar stops. This difference can be seen in the words for "tea" borrowed into various other languages: For example, Spanish te, English tea vs. Portuguese chá, English chai, reflecting the Amoy (Southern Min) [te] vs. Standard Mandarin [ʈʂʰa].

In the case of distinctions that appear to have never developed in Min, it could be argued that the ancestral language did in fact have these distinctions, but they later disappeared. For example, it could be argued that Min varieties descend from a Middle Chinese dialect where retroflex stops merged back into alveolar stops instead of merging with retroflex sibilants. However, this argument cannot be made if there are distinctions in Min that do not appear in EMC (and which reflect ancient features going back to Old Chinese or – ultimately – even Proto-Sino-Tibetan, so that they cannot be explained as secondary developments), and this does indeed appear to be the case. In particular, Proto-Min (the reconstructed ancestor of the Min varieties) appears to have had six series of stops corresponding to the three series (unvoiced, unvoiced aspirated, voiced) of Middle Chinese. The additional three series are voiced aspirated (or breathy voiced), unvoiced "softened", and voiced "softened".

Evidence for the voiced aspirated stops comes from tonal distinctions among the stops. When voiced stops became unvoiced in most varieties and triggered a tone split, words with these stops moved into new lowered (so-called yang) tone classes, while words with unvoiced stops appeared in raised (so-called yin) tone classes. The result is that the yin classes have words with both aspirated and unaspirated stops, while the yang classes have only one of the two, depending on how the formerly voiced stops developed. Min varieties, however, have both kinds of words in yang classes as well as yin classes. This has caused scholars to reconstruct voiced aspirates (probably realized as breathy voiced consonants) in Proto-Min, which develop into unvoiced aspirates in yang-class words.

In addition, in some Min varieties, some words with EMC stops are reflected with stops while others are reflected with "softened" consonants, typically voiced fricatives or approximants. Such "softened stops" occur in both yin and yang classes, suggesting that Proto-Min had both unvoiced and voiced "softened stops". Presumably "softened stops" were actually fricatives of some sort, but it is unclear exactly what they were.

Scholars generally assume that these additional Proto-Min sounds reflect distinctions in Old Chinese that vanished in Early Middle Chinese but remained in Proto-Min. Until recently, no reconstructions of Old Chinese specifically accounted for the Proto-Min distinctions, but the recent reconstruction of William Baxter and Laurent Sagart accounts for both voiced aspirates and softened stops. According to them, voiced aspirates reflect Old Chinese stops in words with particular consonant prefixes, while softened stops reflect Old Chinese stops in words with a minor syllable prefix, so that the stop occurred between vowels. The postulated development of the softened stops is very similar to the development of voiced fricatives in Vietnamese, which likewise occur in both yin and yang varieties and are reconstructed as developing from words with minor syllables.

== See also ==
- Old Chinese phonology
- Standard Chinese phonology
- Sino-Xenic pronunciations
