= Chongniu =

Pairs of Middle Chinese syllables

Chóngniǔ (simplified Chinese: 重纽; traditional Chinese: 重紐; lit. 'repeated button') or rime doublets are certain pairs of Middle Chinese syllables that are consistently distinguished in rime dictionaries and rime tables, but without a clear indication of the phonological basis of the distinction.

== Description ==
Rime dictionaries such as the Qieyun and Guangyun divided words by tone and then into rhyme groups. Each rhyme group was subdivided into homophone groups preceded by a small circle called a niǔ (紐, 'button'). The pronunciation of each homophone group was indicated by a fǎnqiè formula, a pair of characters having respectively the same initial and final sound as the word being described. By systematically analysing the fanqie, it is possible to identify equivalent initial and final spellers, and thus enumerate the initials and finals, but not their phonetic values. Rime tables such as the Yunjing further analysed the syllables distinguished by the rime dictionaries into initial consonant, 'open' (kāi 開) or 'closed' (hé 合), divisions (I–IV), broad rhyme class and tone. The closed distinction is generally considered to represent lip rounding.

The interpretation of the divisions has long been the most obscure part of traditional phonology. The finals implied by the fanqie may be divided into four broad classes based on the initials with which they co-occur. Because these classes correlate with rows in the rime tables, they are conventionally named divisions I–IV. Finals of divisions I, II and IV occur only in the corresponding rows of the rime tables, but division-III finals are spread across the second, third and fourth rows.

In most cases the different homophone groups within a Qieyun rhyme group are clearly distinguished by having a different initial or through the open/closed distinction in the rime tables. Pairs of syllables that are not so distinguished are known as chongniu, and occur only with certain division-III finals and with labial, velar or laryngeal initials. The distinction is reflected in the rime tables, where these pairs are divided between rows 3 and 4, and their finals are therefore known as chongniu-III and chongniu-IV finals respectively. The pairs are usually distinguished in fanqie spellings:

- The finals of chongniu-III words are usually rendered with other division-III chongniu words, but sometimes with words with retroflex initials.
- The finals of chongniu-IV words are rendered with other division-IV chongniu words or with words with acute initials.

Some Chinese authors refer to chongniu-III and chongniu-IV finals as types B and A respectively, so as to distinguish chongniu-IV finals, which are still division-III finals, from "pure" division-IV finals unrelated to chongniu.

The Middle Chinese notations of Li Fang-Kuei and William Baxter distinguish the chongniu-IV parts, spelt with both "j" and "i", from chongniu-III parts, spelt with only "j"; without any commitment to pronunciation:

The chongniu finals of Middle Chinese
Rhyme group	Li's notation		Baxter's notation	
Rhyme group	Chongniu-III	Chongniu-IV	Chongniu-III	Chongniu-IV
支 zhī	-jĕ	-jiĕ	-je	-jie
支 zhī	-jwĕ	-jwiĕ	-jwe	-jwie
脂 zhī	-i	-ji	-ij	-jij
脂 zhī	-wi	-jwi	-wij	-jwij
祭 jì (Note: This final occurs only in the departing tone.)	-jäi	-jiäi	-jej	-jiej
祭 jì	-jwäi	-jwiäi	-jwej	-jwiej
宵 xiāo	-jäu	-jiäu	-jew	-jiew
鹽 yán	-jäm/p	-jiäm/p	-jem/p	-jiem/p
侵 qīn	-jəm/p	-jiəm/p	-im/p	-jim/p
仙 xiān	-jän/t	-jiän/t	-jen/t	-jien/t
仙 xiān	-jwän/t	-jwiän/t	-jwen/t	-jwien/t
真 zhēn	-jĕn/t	-jiĕn/t	-in/t	-jin/t
諄 zhūn	-juĕn/t	-juiĕn/t	-win/t	-jwin/t

Baxter identifies some other finals that behave like chongniu finals, but do not occur paired within Qieyun rhyme groups:

Chongniu-like finals
Rhyme group	Li's notation		Baxter's notation	
Rhyme group	Chongniu-III	Chongniu-IV	Chongniu-III	Chongniu-IV
庚 gēng	-jɐng		-jæng/k	
庚 gēng	-jwɐng		-jwæng/k	
清 qīng		-jäng		-jieng/k
清 qīng		-jwäng		-jwieng/k
幽 yōu		-jiə̆u		-jiw

Each of the chongniu-IV finals falls within a single Old Chinese rhyme class, but the chongniu-III and non-chongniu parts of 支 zhī and 真 zhēn span two Old Chinese rhyme classes.

== Reflexes of the distinction ==
This distinction is generally not reflected in modern varieties of Chinese, with sporadic exceptions such as Beijing jì for chongniu-IV 悸 in contrast with guì for chongniu-III 匱 or bí for chongniu-IV 鼻 and bèi for chongniu-III 備.

It is, however, reflected in the choice of Chinese characters to represent Old Japanese syllables in the Man'yōgana system, particularly the kō/otsu distinction between i_{1} and i_{2} after velars and labials. These vowels merged as i in later forms of Japanese. In almost all cases, Old Japanese syllables with i_{1} were transcribed with chongniu-IV words, while syllables with i_{2} were transcribed with chongniu-III words or other division-III words. For example, ki_{1} was written with chongniu-IV words 祇, 棄 or 吉, while ki_{2} was written with chongniu-III words 奇 or 寄. There is little independent evidence of the pronunciation of these Old Japanese syllables, but internal reconstruction suggests that i_{1} reflects Proto-Japonic *i, while i_{2} reflects *əi or *ui.

The distinction is reflected most clearly in some Sino-Vietnamese and Sino-Korean readings:

Reflexes of chongniu pairs (Note: Common readings (irregular or regular) are given in parentheses)
Type	Character	Middle Chinese	Beijing	Guangzhou	Sino-Vietnamese	Sino-Korean (Note: Korean forms are given using the Yale romanization of Korean, which is standard for linguistic work.)
chongniu-III	乙	'it	yi (yǐ)	jat^{1} (jyut^{3})	ất	īl (ul)
chongniu-IV	一	'jit	yi (yī)	jat^{1}	nhất	īl
chongniu-III	𪔗	'in	yīn	jan1	ân	in
chongniu-IV	因	'jin	yīn	jan1	nhân	in
chongniu-III	碑	pje	bēi	bei^{1}	bi	pi
chongniu-IV	卑	pjie	bēi	bei^{1}	ti	pi
chongniu-III	筆	pit	bi (bǐ)	bat^{1}	bất (bút) (Note: Reading bất, which arose through regular sound changes, is very rarely attested, for instance: in Nam Hoa tự điển; irregular reading bút is diachronically a pre-Middle-Chinese loan yet is accepted as Sino-Vietnamese.)	phil
chongniu-IV	必	pjit	bi (bì)	bat^{1} (bit^{1})	tất	phil
chongniu-III	貧	bin	pín	pan^{4}	bần	bin
chongniu-IV	嬪	bjin	pín	pan^{4}	tần	bin
chongniu-III	珉	min	mín	man^{4}	mân	min
chongniu-IV	民	mjin	mín	man^{4}	dân	min
chongniu-III	縻	mje	mí	mei^{4}	mi	mi
chongniu-IV	彌	mjie	mí	mei^{4}	di	mi
chongniu-III	銘	meng	míng	ming^{4}	minh	myeng
chongniu-IV	名	mjieng	míng	ming^{4}	*dinh (danh) (Note: Only regular, southern reading danh is attested; the northern regular reading *dinh could have hypothetically arisen through regular sound changes but is not attested.)	myeng
chongniu-III	愆	khjen	qiān	hin^{1}	khiên	ken
chongniu-IV	遣	khjienX	qiǎn	hin^{2}	khiển	kyen
chongniu-III	奄	'jem	yān	jim^{1}	yêm	em
chongniu-IV	厭	'jiemX	yàn	jim^{3}	yếm	yem

In Sino-Vietnamese, labial initials have become dentals before division-IV chongniu finals, possibly reflecting an earlier palatal element. Even so, the labial initials of some Chongniu-IV words remained labials in Sino-Vietnamese instead of becoming dentals; for instances: "narrow" 褊 EMCh pjianʼ > Beijing biăn vs. SV biển, (Note: mistranscribed as biên in Meier & Peyrot (2017) & Shimizu (2012)) "stab, quick" 剽 EMCh *pʰjiawʰ > Beijing piào vs. SV phiếu, "gourd" 瓢 EMCh bjiaw > Beijing piáo vs. SV biều, and "cotton" 棉 EMCh. mjian > Beijing mián vs. SV miên. This phenomenon can be explained as resulting from "chronological and possibly also stylistic differences": some words might have been borrowed early, when chongniu-III vs. chongniu-IV distinction did not manifest yet as palatisation in Chinese or could not yet be represented as palatalisation in Vietnamese; others might have been borrowed late, when the distinction had been lost.

Sino-Korean shows a palatal glide where division-IV chongniu finals follow velar or laryngeal initials.

== Interpretations ==
The nature of the distinction within Middle Chinese is disputed, with some scholars ascribing it to a medial and others to the main vowel.

Most linguists now accept the proposal of Sergei Yakhontov that Middle Chinese syllables in division II had a medial *-r- in Old Chinese. (Note: Yakhontov originally spelled this medial as *-l.) William Baxter, following earlier ideas of Edwin Pulleyblank, suggested that chongniu-III syllables had medials *-rj- in Old Chinese, while their chongniu-IV counterparts had a medial *-j- before a front vowel. The later revision by Baxter and Laurent Sagart elides the *-j- medial, treating such "Type B" syllables as unmarked, in contrast to "Type A" syllables, which they reconstructed with pharyngealized initials. In this system, Middle Chinese chongniu-III or chongniu-IV syllables are all Type B syllables, which were distinguished by the presence or absence, respectively, of a medial *-r- in Old Chinese.
