= Chen Li (scholar) =

Chinese scholar (1810–1882)

- Born: 1810
- Died: 1882 (aged 71–72)
- Scientific career
- Institutions: Xuehaitang Academy

Chinese name
- Traditional Chinese: 陳澧
- Simplified Chinese: 陈澧
Transcriptions
Standard Mandarin
- Hanyu Pinyin: Chén Lǐ
Yue: Cantonese
- Jyutping: Can4 Lai5

Chen Li (1810–1882) was a Cantonese scholar of the evidential research school, known for his contributions to historical Chinese phonology.

Chen Li's family originally came from Shaoxing prefecture in Zhejiang province, moving to Nanjing in the early Ming dynasty. Chen's grandfather moved to Guangzhou, where his two sons remained after his death. Chen Li was the first in his family to register as a Guangzhou resident. He passed the provincial examination in 1832, but was unsuccessful in the imperial examination seven times. He also sat examinations at the Xuehaitang Academy in Guangzhou, headed by Ruan Yuan, and taught there as co-director for several decades from 1840.

In his pioneering Qièyùn kǎo (切韻考 "An examination of the Qieyun", 1842), Chen systematically analysed the pairs of characters (fanqie) used to indicate pronunciations of words in the Guangyun, a Song dynasty redaction of the Qieyun dictionary published in 601. Chen was able to enumerate the initials and finals of the phonological system of these dictionaries, now known as Middle Chinese, and demonstrate subtle differences from those of the later rhyme tables. This analysis would be repeated, though less thoroughly, in the 20th century by the Swedish linguist Bernhard Karlgren, who was unaware of Chen's work at the time. Chen's collected essays (東塾集 Dōngshú jí), published in 1892 after his death, include a much-quoted early description of the phonology of Cantonese in comparison with the categories of Middle Chinese.

Chen was one of several Guangzhou scholars who sought to reconcile the moral concerns of Neo-Confucianism with the analytical methods of Han learning, a reaction against Neo-Confucianism ("Song learning"). In his Hànrú tōngyì (漢儒通義 "Comprehensive meanings of the Han Confucians", 1856), Chen defended the philosophical significance of Han learning. In later works he argued that Zhu Xi, the founder of Neo-Confucianism, was also concerned with philology.
