= Middle Chinese =

Chinese pronunciation system (601 AD)

- Ancient Chinese
- 漢語 xanH ngjoX
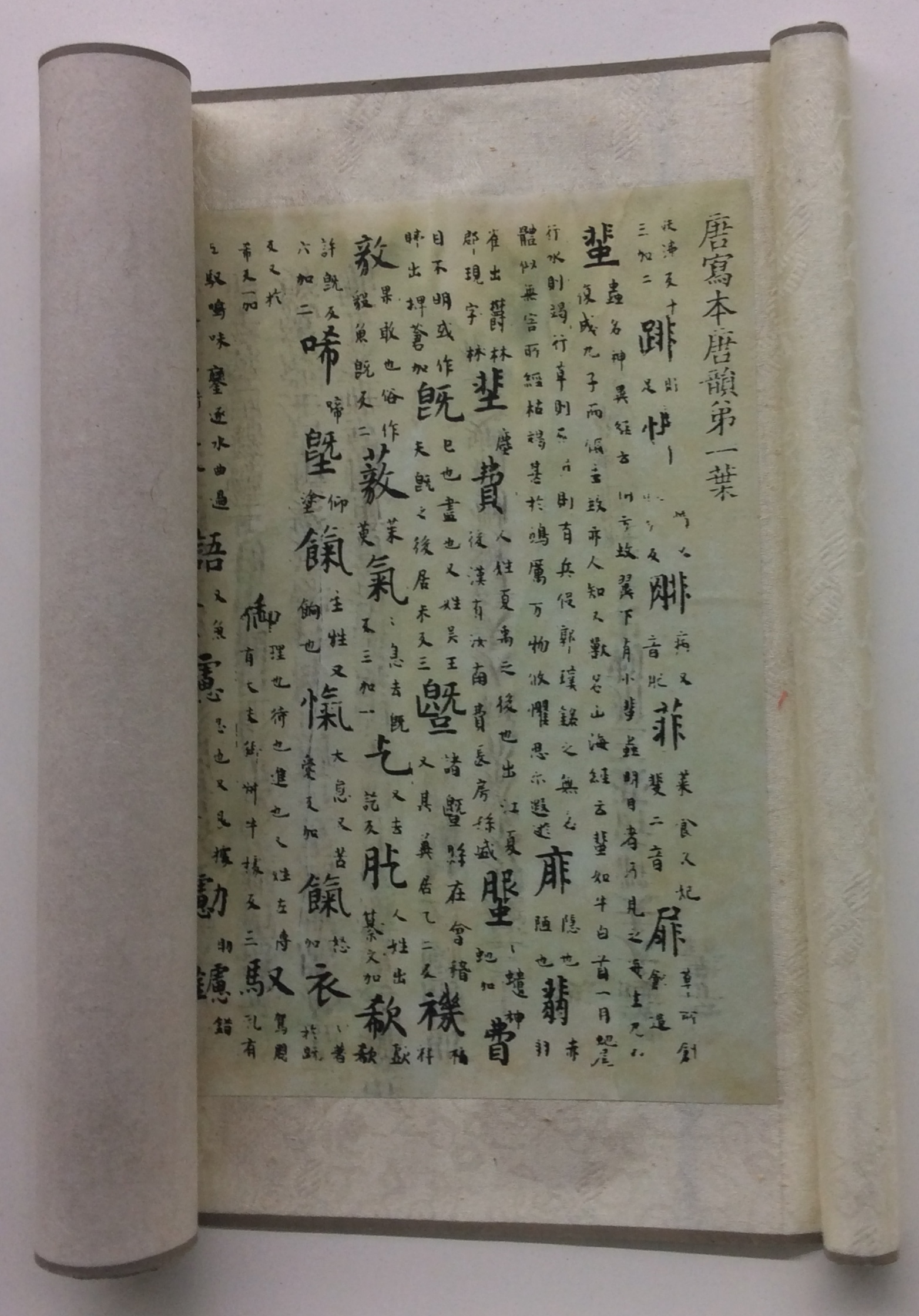
- Part of the Tangyun, an 8th-century edition of the Qieyun dictionary
- Native to: China
- Era: 4th–12th centuries Northern and Southern dynasties, Sui, Tang, Five Dynasties and Ten Kingdoms period, Song
- Language family: Sino-Tibetan: Sinitic; Chinese; Middle Chinese
- Early forms: Old Chinese: Eastern Han Chinese
- Writing system: Chinese characters

Language codes
- ISO 639-3: ltc
- Glottolog: midd1344

Chinese name
- Traditional Chinese: 中古漢語
- Simplified Chinese: 中古汉语
Transcriptions
Standard Mandarin
- Hanyu Pinyin: Zhōnggǔ Hànyǔ
- Wade–Giles: chung^{1}-ku^{3} Han^{4}-yü^{3}
- IPA: [ʈʂʊ́ŋ kù xân ỳ]
Wu
- Wugniu: tson^{1} ku^{3} hoe^{5} gniu^{4}
- IPA: Shanghainese: [tsoŋ˥ ku˧ hø˧ ȵy˦]
Yue: Cantonese
- Yale Romanization: Jūnggú Honyúh
- Jyutping: zung^{1} gu^{2} hon^{3} jyu^{5}
- IPA: [tsʊŋ˥ ku˧˥ hɔn˧ jy˩˧]
Southern Min
- Tâi-lô: tiong-kóo Hàn-gú

Middle Chinese (formerly known as Ancient Chinese) or the Qieyun system (QYS) is the historical variety of Chinese recorded in the Qieyun, a rhyme dictionary first published in 601 and followed by several revised and expanded editions. The Swedish linguist Bernhard Karlgren thought that the dictionary recorded a speech standard of the capital Chang'an of the Sui and Tang dynasties. However, based on the preface of the Qieyun, most scholars now believe that it records a compromise between northern and southern reading and poetic traditions from the late Northern and Southern dynasties period. This composite system contains important information for the reconstruction of the preceding system of Old Chinese phonology (early 1st millennium BC).

The fanqie method used to indicate pronunciation in these dictionaries, though an improvement on earlier methods, proved awkward in practice. The mid-12th-century Yunjing and other rime tables (aka rhyme tables) incorporate a more sophisticated and convenient analysis of the Qieyun phonology. The rime tables attest to a number of sound changes that had occurred over the centuries following the publication of the Qieyun. Linguists sometimes refer to the system of the Qieyun as Early Middle Chinese and the variant revealed by the rime tables as Late Middle Chinese.

The dictionaries and tables describe pronunciations in relative terms, but do not give their actual sounds. Karlgren was the first to attempt a reconstruction of the sounds of Middle Chinese, comparing its categories with modern varieties of Chinese and the Sino-Xenic pronunciations used in the reading traditions of neighbouring countries. Several other scholars have produced their own reconstructions using similar methods.

The Qieyun system is often used as a framework for Chinese dialectology. With the exception of Min varieties, which show independent developments from Old Chinese, modern Chinese varieties can be largely treated as divergent developments from Middle Chinese. The study of Middle Chinese also provides for a better understanding and analysis of Classical Chinese poetry, such as the study of Tang poetry.

== Sources ==
The reconstruction of Middle Chinese phonology is largely dependent upon detailed descriptions in a few original sources. The most important of these is the Qieyun rime dictionary (601) and its revisions. The Qieyun is often used together with interpretations in Song dynasty rime tables such as the Yunjing, Qiyin lüe, and the later Qieyun zhizhangtu and Sisheng dengzi. The documentary sources are supplemented by comparison with modern Chinese varieties, pronunciation of Chinese words borrowed by other languages—particularly Japanese, Korean and Vietnamese—transcription into Chinese characters of foreign names, transcription of Chinese names in alphabetic scripts such as Brahmi, Tibetan and Uyghur, and evidence regarding rhyme and tone patterns from classical Chinese poetry.

=== Rhyme dictionaries ===
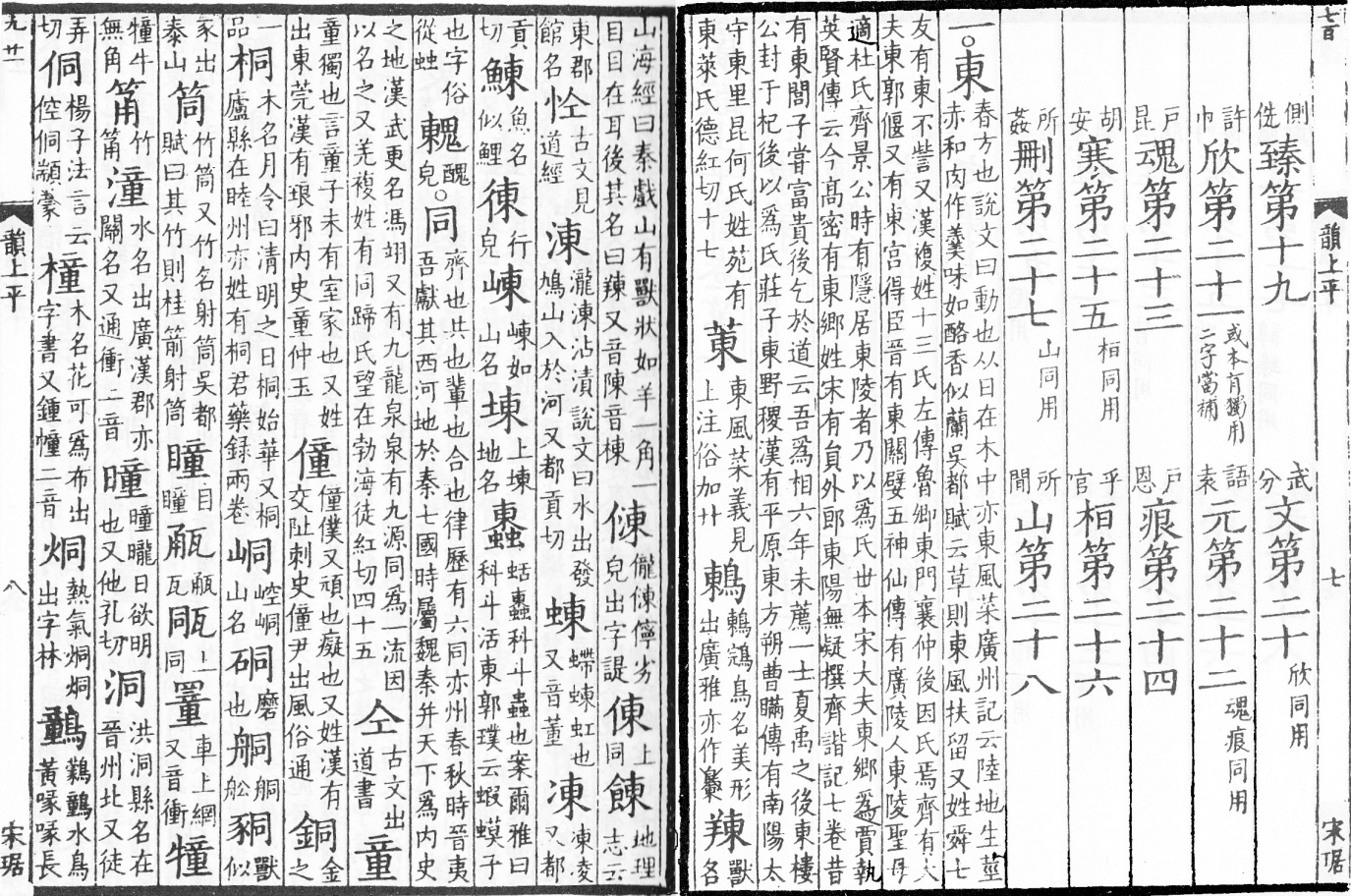
The start of the first rhyme class of the Guangyun (東 dōng 'east')

Chinese scholars of the Northern and Southern dynasties period were concerned with the correct recitation of the classics. Various schools produced dictionaries to codify reading pronunciations and the associated rhyme conventions of regulated verse. (Note: Karlgren used the French spelling "rime" in his English-language writing, and this practice has been followed by several other authors.) The Qieyun (601) was an attempt to merge the distinctions in six earlier dictionaries, which were eclipsed by its success and are no longer extant. It was accepted as the standard reading pronunciation during the Tang dynasty, and went through several revisions and expansions over the following centuries.

The Qieyun is thus the oldest surviving rhyme dictionary and the main source for the pronunciation of characters in Early Middle Chinese (EMC). At the time of Bernhard Karlgren's seminal work on Middle Chinese in the early 20th century, only fragments of the Qieyun were known, and scholars relied on the Guangyun (1008), a much expanded edition from the Song dynasty. However, significant sections of a version of the Qieyun itself were subsequently discovered in the caves of Dunhuang, and a complete copy of Wang Renxu's 706 edition from the Palace Library was found in 1947.

The rhyme dictionaries organize Chinese characters by their pronunciation, according to a hierarchy of tone, rhyme and homophony. Characters with identical pronunciations are grouped into homophone classes, whose pronunciation is described using two fanqie characters, the first of which has the initial sound of the characters in the homophone class and second of which has the same sound as the rest of the syllable (the final). The use of fanqie was an important innovation of the Qieyun and allowed the pronunciation of all characters to be described exactly; earlier dictionaries simply described the pronunciation of unfamiliar characters in terms of the most similar-sounding familiar character.

The fanqie system uses multiple equivalent characters to represent each particular initial, and likewise for finals. The categories of initials and finals actually represented were first identified by the Cantonese scholar Chen Li in a careful analysis published in his Qieyun kao (1842). Chen's method was to equate two fanqie initials (or finals) whenever one was used in the fanqie spelling of the pronunciation of the other, and to follow chains of such equivalences to identify groups of spellers for each initial or final. For example, the pronunciation of the character 東 was given using the fanqie spelling 德紅, the pronunciation of 德 was given as 多特, and the pronunciation of 多 was given as 德河, from which we can conclude that the words 東, 德 and 多 all had the same initial sound.

The Qieyun classified homonyms under 193 rhyme classes, each of which is placed within one of the four tones. A single rhyme class may contain multiple finals, generally differing only in the medial (especially when it is /w/) or in so-called chongniu doublets.

=== Rime tables ===
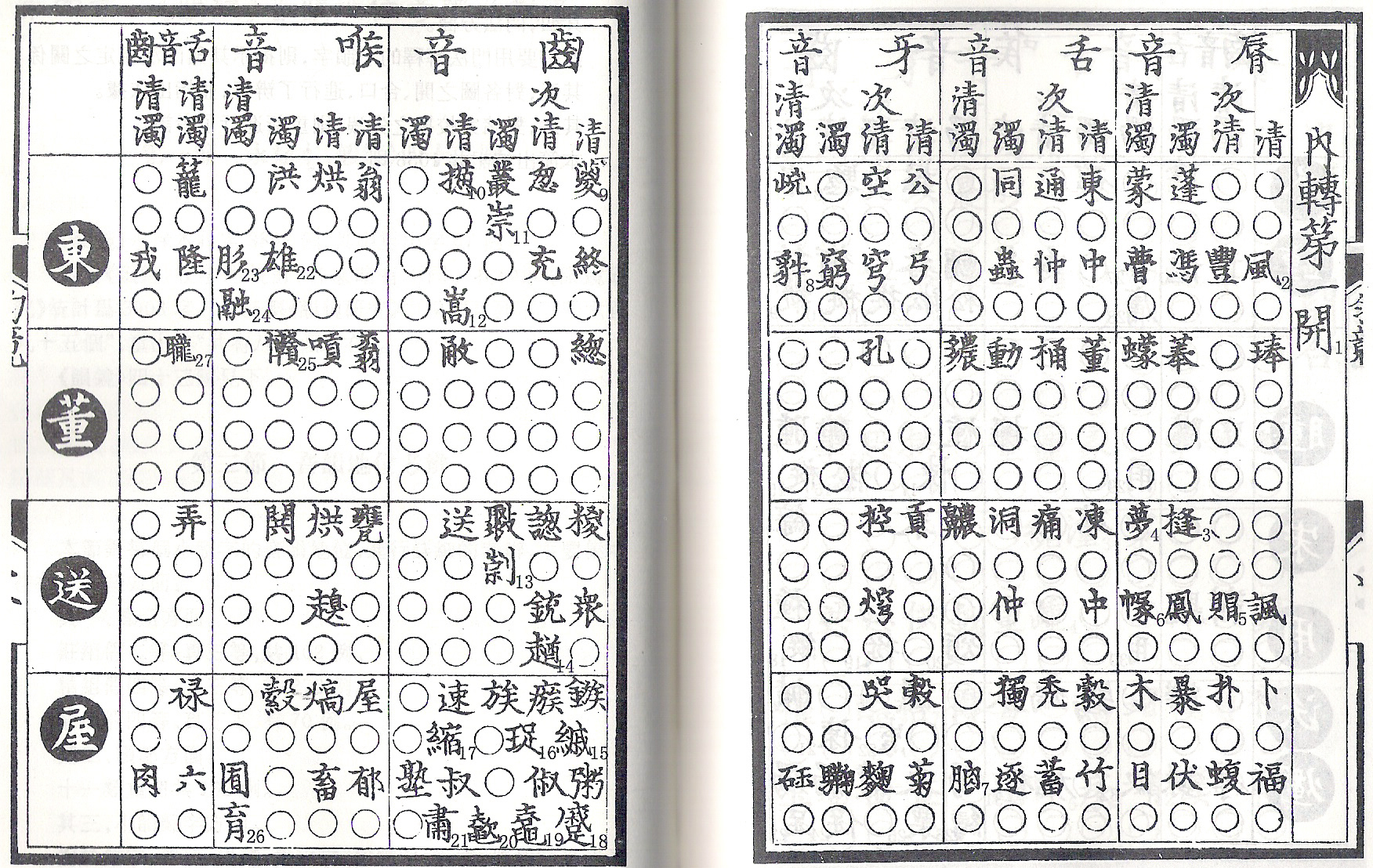
The first table of the Yunjing, covering the Guangyun rhyme classes 東 dōng, 董 dǒng, 送 sòng and 屋 wū (/-k/ in Middle Chinese)

The Yunjing (c. 1150 AD) is the oldest of the so-called rime tables, which provide a more detailed phonological analysis of the system contained in the Qieyun. The Yunjing was created centuries after the Qieyun, and the authors of the Yunjing were attempting to interpret a phonological system that differed in significant ways from that of their own Late Middle Chinese (LMC) dialect. They were aware of this, and attempted to reconstruct Qieyun phonology as well as possible through a close analysis of regularities in the system and co-occurrence relationships between the initials and finals indicated by the fanqie characters. However, the analysis inevitably shows some influence from LMC, which needs to be taken into account when interpreting difficult aspects of the system.

The Yunjing is organized into 43 tables, each covering several Qieyun rhyme classes, and classified as:

- One of 16 broad rhyme classes (shè)—each described as either "inner" or "outer". The meaning of this is debated but it has been suggested that it refers to the height of the main vowel, with "outer" finals having an open vowel (/ɑ/ or /a/, /æ/) and "inner" finals having a mid or close vowel.
- "Open mouth" or "closed mouth", indicating whether lip rounding is present. "Closed" finals either have a rounded vowel (e.g. /u/) or rounded glide.

Each table has 23 columns, one for each initial consonant. Although the Yunjing distinguishes 36 initials, they are placed in 23 columns by combining palatals, retroflexes, and dentals under the same column. This does not lead to cases where two homophone classes are conflated, as the grades (rows) are arranged so that all would-be minimal pairs distinguished only by the retroflex vs. palatal vs. alveolar character of the initial end up in different rows.

Each initial is further classified as follows:

- Place of articulation: labials, alveolars, velars, affricates and sibilants, and laryngeals
- Phonation: voiceless, voiceless aspirated, voiced, nasal or liquid

Each table also has 16 rows, with a group of 4 rows for each of the four tones of the traditional system in which finals ending in /p/, /t/ or /k/ are considered to be checked tone variants of finals ending in /m/, /n/ or /ŋ/ rather than separate finals in their own right. The significance of the 4 rows within each tone is difficult to interpret, and is strongly debated. These rows are usually denoted I, II, III and IV, and are thought to relate to differences in palatalization or retroflexion of the syllable's initial or medial, or differences in the quality of similar main vowels (e.g. /ɑ/, /a/, /ɛ/). Other scholars do not view them not as phonetic categories, but instead as formal devices exploiting distributional patterns in the Qieyun to achieve a compact presentation.

Each square in a table contains a character corresponding to a particular homophone class in the Qieyun, if any such character exists. From this arrangement, each homophone class can be placed in the above categories.

=== Modern dialects and Sino-Xenic pronunciations ===
The rime dictionaries and rime tables identify categories of phonetic distinctions but do not indicate the actual pronunciations of these categories. The varied pronunciations of words in modern varieties of Chinese can help, but most modern varieties descend from a Late Middle Chinese koiné and cannot very easily be used to determine the pronunciation of Early Middle Chinese. During the Early Middle Chinese period, large amounts of Chinese vocabulary were systematically borrowed by Vietnamese, Korean and Japanese (collectively the Sino-Xenic pronunciations), but many distinctions were inevitably lost in mapping Chinese phonology onto foreign phonological systems.

For example, the following table shows the pronunciation of the numerals in three modern Chinese varieties, as well as borrowed forms in Vietnamese, Korean and Japanese:

| | | Modern Chinese varieties | | | Sino-Vietnamese | Sino-Korean(Yale) | Sino-Japanese | | Middle Chinese (Note: Middle Chinese forms are given in Baxter's transcription, in which -X and -H denote the rising and departing tones respectively.) |
| | | Beijing | Suzhou | Guangzhou | Sino-Vietnamese | Sino-Korean(Yale) | Go-on | Kan-on | Middle Chinese |
|---|---|---|---|---|---|---|---|---|---|
| 1 | 一 | yī | iəʔ^{7} | jat1 | nhất | il | ichi | itsu | ʔjit |
| 2 | 二 | èr | ɲi^{6} | ji6 | nhị | i ← zi | ni | ji | nyijH |
| 3 | 三 | sān | sɛ^{1} | saam1 | tam | sam | san | | sam |
| 4 | 四 | sì | sɨ^{5} | sei3 | tứ | sa ← so | shi | | sijH |
| 5 | 五 | wǔ | ŋ^{6} | ng5 | ngũ | wo | go | | nguX |
| 6 | 六 | liù | loʔ^{8} | luk6 | lục | ^{l}yuk | roku | riku | ljuwk |
| 7 | 七 | qī | tsʰiəʔ^{7} | cat1 | thất | chil | shichi | shitsu | tshit |
| 8 | 八 | bā | poʔ^{7} | baat3 | bát | phal | hachi | hatsu | pɛt |
| 9 | 九 | jiǔ | tɕiʏ^{3} | gau2 | cửu | kwu | ku | kyū | kjuwX |
| 10 | 十 | shí | zəʔ^{8} | sap6 | thập | sip | jū ← zifu | | dzyip |

=== Transcription evidence ===
Although the evidence from Chinese transcriptions of foreign words is much more limited, and is similarly obscured by the mapping of foreign pronunciations onto Chinese phonology, it serves as direct evidence of a sort that is lacking in all the other types of data, since the pronunciation of the foreign languages borrowed from—especially Sanskrit and Gandhari—is known in great detail.

For example, the nasal initials /m n ŋ/ were used to transcribe Sanskrit nasals in the early Tang, but later they were used for Sanskrit unaspirated voiced initials /b d ɡ/, suggesting that they had become prenasalized stops [ᵐb] [ⁿd] [ᵑɡ] in some northwestern Chinese dialects.

== Methodology ==
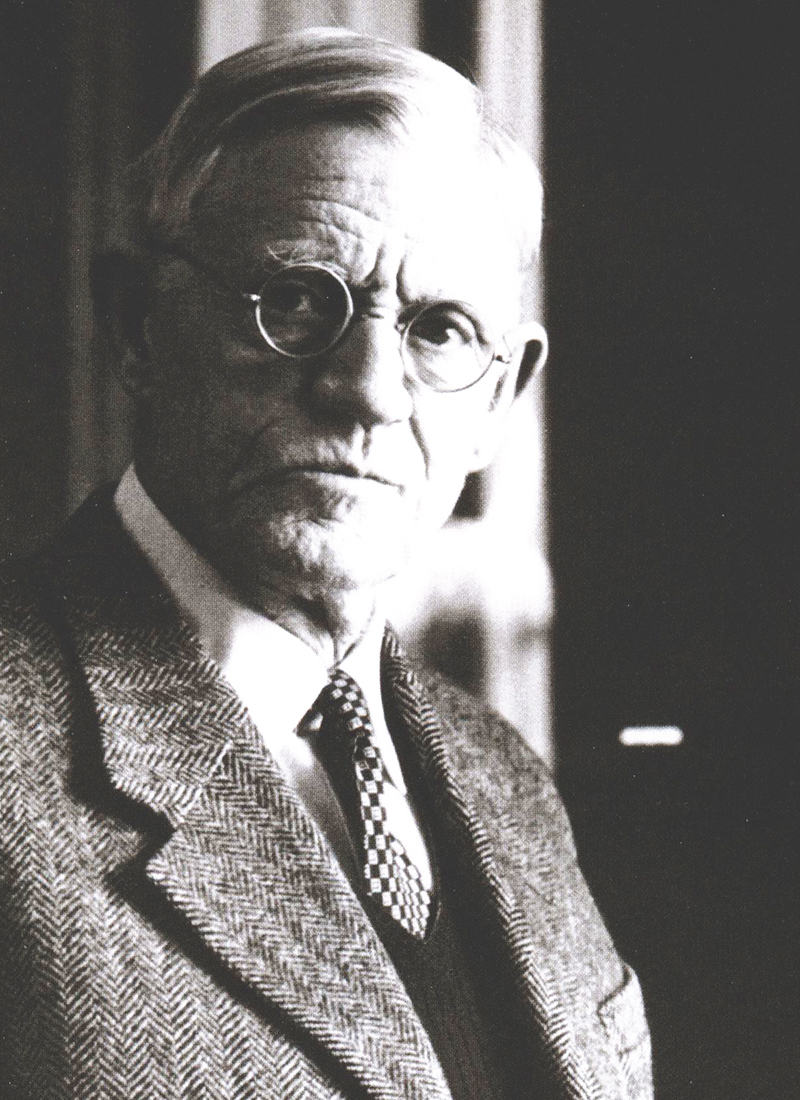
Bernhard Karlgren

The rime dictionaries and rime tables yield phonological categories, but with little hint of what sounds they represent. At the end of the 19th century, European students of Chinese sought to solve this problem by applying the methods of historical linguistics that had been used in reconstructing Proto-Indo-European. Volpicelli (1896) and Schaank (1897) compared the rime tables at the front of the Kangxi Dictionary with modern pronunciations in several varieties, but had little knowledge of linguistics.

Bernhard Karlgren, trained in transcription of Swedish dialects, carried out the first systematic survey of modern varieties of Chinese. He used the oldest known rime tables as descriptions of the sounds of the rime dictionaries, and also studied the Guangyun, at that time the oldest known rime dictionary. Unaware of Chen Li's study, he repeated the analysis of the fanqie required to identify the initials and finals of the dictionary. He believed that the resulting categories reflected the speech standard of the capital Chang'an of the Sui and Tang dynasties. He interpreted the many distinctions as a narrow transcription of the precise sounds of this language, which he sought to reconstruct by treating the Sino-Xenic and modern dialect pronunciations as reflexes of the Qieyun categories. A small number of Qieyun categories were not distinguished in any of the surviving pronunciations, and Karlgren assigned them identical reconstructions.

Karlgren's transcription involved a large number of consonants and vowels, many of them very unevenly distributed. Accepting Karlgren's reconstruction as a description of medieval speech, Chao Yuen Ren and Samuel E. Martin analysed its contrasts to extract a phonemic description. Hugh M. Stimson used a simplified version of Martin's system as an approximate indication of the pronunciation of Tang poetry. Karlgren himself viewed phonemic analysis as a detrimental "craze".

Older versions of the rime dictionaries and rime tables came to light over the first half of the 20th century, and were used by such linguists as Wang Li, Dong Tonghe and Li Rong in their own reconstructions. Edwin Pulleyblank argued that the systems of the Qieyun and the rime tables should be reconstructed as two separate (but related) systems, which he called Early and Late Middle Chinese, respectively. He further argued that his Late Middle Chinese reflected the standard language of the late Tang dynasty.

The preface of the Qieyun recovered in 1947 indicates that it records a compromise between northern and southern reading and poetic traditions from the late Northern and Southern dynasties period (a diasystem). Most linguists now believe that no single dialect contained all the distinctions recorded, but that each distinction did occur somewhere. Several scholars have compared the Qieyun system to cross-dialectal descriptions of English pronunciations, such as John C. Wells's lexical sets, or the notation used in some dictionaries. For example, the words "trap", "bath", "palm", "lot", "cloth" and "thought" contain four different vowels in Received Pronunciation and three in General American; these pronunciations and others can be specified in terms of these six cases.

Although the Qieyun system is no longer viewed as describing a single form of speech, linguists argue that this enhances its value in reconstructing earlier forms of Chinese, just as a cross-dialectal description of English pronunciations contains more information about earlier forms of English than any single modern form. The emphasis has shifted from precise phones to the structure of the phonological system. Li Fang-Kuei, as a prelude to his reconstruction of Old Chinese, produced a revision of Karlgren's notation, adding new notations for the few categories not distinguished by Karlgren, without assigning them pronunciations. This notation is still widely used, but its symbols, based on Johan August Lundell's Swedish Dialect Alphabet, differ from the familiar International Phonetic Alphabet. To remedy this, William H. Baxter produced his own notation for the Qieyun and rime table categories for use in his reconstruction of Old Chinese. (Note: By convention, Middle Chinese reconstructions are shown without an asterisk, while Old Chinese reconstructions are almost always shown preceded by an asterisk.)

All reconstructions of Middle Chinese since Karlgren have followed his approach of beginning with the categories extracted from the rime dictionaries and tables, and using dialect and Sino-Xenic data (and in some cases transcription data) in a subsidiary role to fill in sound values for these categories. Jerry Norman and W. South Coblin have criticized this approach, arguing that viewing the dialect data through the rime dictionaries and rime tables distorts the evidence. They argue for a full application of the comparative method to the modern varieties, supplemented by systematic use of transcription data.

== Phonology ==
Traditional Chinese syllable structure

The traditional analysis of the Chinese syllable, derived from the fanqie method, is into an initial consonant, or "initial", (shēngmǔ 聲母) and a final (yùnmǔ 韻母). Modern linguists subdivide the final into an optional "medial" glide (yùntóu 韻頭), a main vowel or "nucleus" (yùnfù 韻腹) and an optional final consonant or "coda" (yùnwěi 韻尾). Most reconstructions of Middle Chinese include the glides /j/ and /w/, as well as a combination /jw/, but many also include vocalic "glides" such as /i̯/ in a diphthong /i̯e/. Final consonants /j/, /w/, /m/, /n/, /ŋ/, /p/, /t/ and /k/ are widely accepted, sometimes with additional codas such as /wk/ or /wŋ/. Rhyming syllables in the Qieyun are assumed to have the same nuclear vowel and coda, but often have different medials.

Middle Chinese reconstructions by different modern linguists vary. These differences are minor and fairly uncontroversial in terms of consonants; however, there is a more significant difference as to the vowels. The most widely used transcriptions are Li Fang-Kuei's modification of Karlgren's reconstruction and William Baxter's typeable notation.

=== Initials ===
The preface of the Yunjing identifies a traditional set of 36 initials, each named with an exemplary character. An earlier version comprising 30 initials is known from fragments among the Dunhuang manuscripts. In contrast, identifying the initials of the Qieyun required a painstaking analysis of fanqie relationships across the whole dictionary, a task first undertaken by the Cantonese scholar Chen Li in 1842 and refined by others since. This analysis revealed a slightly different set of initials from the traditional set. Moreover, most scholars believe that some distinctions among the 36 initials were no longer current at the time of the rime tables, but were retained under the influence of the earlier dictionaries.

Early Middle Chinese (EMC) had three types of stops: voiced, voiceless, and voiceless aspirated. There were five series of coronal obstruents, with a three-way distinction between dental (or alveolar), retroflex and palatal among affricates and fricatives, and a two-way dental/retroflex distinction among stop consonants. The following table shows the initials of Early Middle Chinese, with their traditional names and approximate values:

Early Middle Chinese initials with traditional names
| | | Labial (Note: The rhyme tables describe a later stage in which labiodental fricatives were also distinguished.) | Dental (Note: It is not clear whether these had an alveolar or dental articulation. They are mostly alveolar in modern Chinese varieties.) | Retroflex stop (Note: Karlgren reconstructed these as palatal stops, but most scholars now believe they were retroflex stops.) | Dental sibilant | Retroflex sibilant | Palatal (Note: The retroflex and palatal sibilants were treated as a single series in the rime tables. Chen Li was the first to realize (in 1842) that they were distinguished in the Qieyun.) | Velar | Laryngeal (Note: The point of articulation of the fricatives is not clear, and varies between the modern varieties.) |
|---|---|---|---|---|---|---|---|---|---|
| Stop or affricate | tenuis | 幫 p | 端 t | 知 ʈ | 精 ts | 莊 ʈʂ | 章 tɕ | 見 k | 影 ʔ |
| Stop or affricate | aspirate | 滂 pʰ | 透 tʰ | 徹 ʈʰ | 清 tsʰ | 初 ʈsʰ | 昌 tɕʰ | 溪 kʰ | |
| Stop or affricate | voiced | 並 b | 定 d | 澄 ɖ | 從 dz | 崇 ɖʐ | 禪 dʑ (Note: The initials 禪 and 船 are reversed from their positions in the rime tables, which are believed to have confused them.) | 群 ɡ | |
| Nasal | | 明 m | 泥 n | 娘 ɳ | | | 日 ɲ | 疑 ŋ | |
| Fricative | voiceless | | | | 心 s | 生 ʂ | 書 ɕ | | 曉 x |
| Fricative | voiced | | | | 邪 z | 俟 ʐ (Note: The ʐ initial occurs in only two words 俟 and 漦 in the Qieyun, and is merged with ɖʐ in the Guangyun. It is omitted in many reconstructions, and has no standard Chinese name.) | 船 ʑ | | 匣/云 ɣ (Note: In the rime tables, the palatal allophone of ɣ (云) is combined with j (以) as a single laryngeal initial 喻. However in the Qieyun system j patterns with the palatals.) |
| Approximant | | | 來 l | | | | 以 j | | |

Old Chinese had a simpler system with no palatal or retroflex consonants; the more complex system of EMC is thought to have arisen from a combination of Old Chinese obstruents with a following /r/ and/or /j/.

Bernhard Karlgren developed the first modern reconstruction of Middle Chinese. The main differences between Karlgren and newer reconstructions of the initials are:

- The reversal of /ʑ/ and /dʑ/. Karlgren based his reconstruction on the Song dynasty rime tables. However, because of mergers between these two sounds between Early and Late Middle Chinese, the Chinese phonologists who created the rime tables could rely only on tradition to tell what the respective values of these two consonants were; evidently they were accidentally reversed at one stage.
- Karlgren also assumed that the EMC retroflex stops were actually palatal stops based on their tendency to co-occur with front vowels and /j/, but this view is no longer held.
- Karlgren assumed that voiced consonants were actually breathy voiced. This is now assumed only for LMC, not EMC.

Other sources from around the same time as the Qieyun reveal a slightly different system, which is believed to reflect southern pronunciation. In this system, the voiced fricatives /z/ and /ʐ/ are not distinguished from the voiced affricates /dz/ and /ɖʐ/, respectively, and the retroflex stops are not distinguished from the dental stops.

Several changes occurred between the time of the Qieyun and the rime tables:

- Palatal sibilants merged with retroflex sibilants.
- /ʐ/ merged with /ɖʐ/ (hence reflecting four separate EMC phonemes).
- The palatal nasal /ɲ/ also became retroflex, but turned into a new phoneme /ɻ/ rather than merging with any existing phoneme.
- The palatalized allophone of /ɣ/ (云) merged with /j/ (以) as a single initial /j/ (喻).
- A new series of labiodentals emerged from labials in certain environments, typically where both fronting and rounding occurred (e.g. /j/ plus a back vowel in William Baxter's reconstruction, or a front rounded vowel in Chan's reconstruction). However, modern Min dialects retain bilabial initials in such words, while modern Hakka dialects preserve them in some common words.
- Voiced obstruents gained phonetic breathy voice (still reflected in the Wu Chinese varieties).

The following table shows a representative account of the initials of Late Middle Chinese.

Late Middle Chinese initials
| | | Labial | Dental | Retroflex stop | Dental sibilant | Retroflex sibilant | Velar | Laryngeal |
|---|---|---|---|---|---|---|---|---|
| Stop or affricate | tenuis | 幫 p | 端 t | 知 ʈ | 精 ts | 照 ʈʂ | 見 k | 影 ʔ |
| Stop or affricate | aspirate | 滂 pʰ | 透 tʰ | 徹 ʈʰ | 清 tsʰ | 穿 ʈsʰ | 溪 kʰ | |
| Stop or affricate | breathy voiced | 並 bʱ | 定 dʱ | 澄 ɖʱ | 從 dzʱ | 牀 (ɖʐʱ) (Note: This initial was not included in the lists of 30 initials in the Dunhuang fragments, and was probably not phonemically distinct from 禪 ʐʱ by that time.) | 群 ɡʱ | |
| Nasal | | 明 m | 泥 n | 娘 ɳ (Note: This initial, which was not included in the lists of 30 initials in the Dunhuang fragments, later merged with n.) | | | 疑 ŋ | |
| Fricative | voiceless | 非, 敷 f (Note: These initials were probably indistinguishable at the LMC stage, but was retained to record their origin from different Qieyun initials. A distinction between [f] and [fʰ] would be unusual, but the two initials might have been distinguished at an earlier phase as affricates [pf] and [pfʰ].) | | | 心 s | 審 ʂ | | 曉 x |
| Fricative | breathy voiced | 奉 vʱ | | | 邪 zʱ | 禪 ʐʱ | | 匣 ɣʱ |
| Approximant | | 微 ʋ (Note: This initial becomes [w] in Mandarin dialects and [v] or [m] in some southern dialects.) | 來 l | | | 日 ɻ (Note: This initial was derived from the EMC palatal nasal. In northern dialects it has become [ʐ] (or [ɻ]), while southern dialects have [j], [z], [ɲ], or [n].) | | 喻 ʜ |

The voicing distinction is retained in modern Wu and Old Xiang dialects, but has disappeared from other varieties. In Min dialects the retroflex stops have merged with the dental stops, while elsewhere they have merged with the retroflex sibilants. In the south these have also merged with the dental sibilants, but the distinction is retained in most Mandarin dialects. The palatal series of modern Mandarin dialects, resulting from a merger of palatal allophones of dental sibilants and velars, is a much more recent development, unconnected with the earlier palatal consonants.

=== Finals ===
The remainder of a syllable after the initial consonant is the final, represented in the Qieyun by several equivalent second fanqie spellers. Each final is contained within a single rhyme class, but a rhyme class may contain between one and four finals. Finals are usually analysed as consisting of an optional medial, either a semivowel, reduced vowel or some combination of these, a vowel, an optional final consonant and a tone. Their reconstruction is much more difficult than the initials due to the combination of multiple phonemes into a single class.

The generally accepted final consonants are semivowels /j/ and /w/, nasals /m/, /n/ and /ŋ/, and stops /p/, /t/ and /k/. Some authors also propose codas /wŋ/ and /wk/, based on the separate treatment of certain rhyme classes in the dictionaries. Finals with vocalic and nasal codas may have one of three tones, named level, rising and departing. Finals with stop codas are distributed in the same way as corresponding nasal finals, and are described as their entering tone counterparts.

There is much less agreement regarding the medials and vowels. It is generally agreed that "closed" finals had a rounded glide /w/ or vowel /u/, and that the vowels in "outer" finals were more open than those in "inner" finals. The interpretation of the "divisions" is more controversial. Three classes of Qieyun finals occur exclusively in the first, second or fourth rows of the rime tables, respectively, and have thus been labelled finals of divisions I, II and IV. The remaining finals are labelled division-III finals because they occur in the third row, but they may also occur in the second or fourth rows for some initials. Most linguists agree that division-III finals contained a /j/ medial and that division-I finals had no such medial, but further details vary between reconstructions. To account for the many rhyme classes distinguished by the Qieyun, Karlgren proposed 16 vowels and 4 medials. Later scholars have proposed numerous variations.

=== Tones ===
The four tones of Middle Chinese were first listed by Shen Yue c. 500 AD. The first three, the "even" or "level", "rising" and "departing" tones, occur in open syllables and syllables ending with nasal consonants. The remaining syllables, ending in stop consonants, were described as the "entering" tone counterparts of syllables ending with the corresponding nasals. The Qieyun and its successors were organized around these categories, with two volumes for the even tone, which had the most words, and one volume each for the other tones.

The pitch contours of modern reflexes of the four Middle Chinese tones vary so widely that linguists have not been able to establish the probable Middle Chinese values by means of the comparative method. Karlgren interpreted the names of the first three tones literally as level, rising and falling pitch contours, respectively, and this interpretation remains widely accepted. Accordingly, Pan and Zhang reconstruct the level tone as mid (˧ or 33), the rising tone as mid rising (˧˥ or 35), the departing tone as high falling (˥˩ or 51), and the entering tone as ˧3ʔ. Some scholars have voiced doubts about the degree to which the names were descriptive, because they are also examples of the tone categories.

Some descriptions from contemporaries and other data seem to suggest a somewhat different picture. For example, the oldest known description of the tones, which is found in a Song dynasty quotation from the early 9th century Yuanhe Yunpu 元和韻譜 (no longer extant):

Level tone is sad and stable. Rising tone is strident and rising. Departing tone is clear and distant. Entering tone is straight and abrupt. (Note: 「平聲哀而安，上聲厲而舉，去聲清而遠，入聲直而促」, translated in Ting (1996), p. 152)

In 880, the Japanese monk Annen, citing an account from the early 8th century, stated

the level tone was straight and low, ... the rising tone was straight and high, ... the departing tone was slightly drawn out, ... the entering tone stops abruptly. (Note: The word translated "straight" (直 zhí) could mean level or rising with a constant slope.)

Based on Annen's description, other similar statements and related data, Mei Tsu-lin concluded that the level tone was long, level and low, the rising tone was short, level and high, the departing tone was somewhat long and probably high and rising, and the entering tone was short (as the syllable ended in a voiceless stop) and probably high.

The tone system of Middle Chinese is strikingly similar to those of its neighbours in the Mainland Southeast Asia linguistic area—proto-Hmong–Mien, proto-Tai and early Vietnamese—none of which is genetically related to Chinese. Moreover, the earliest strata of loans display a regular correspondence between tonal categories in the different languages. In 1954, André-Georges Haudricourt showed that Vietnamese counterparts of the rising and departing tones corresponded to final /ʔ/ and /s/, respectively, in other (atonal) Austroasiatic languages. He thus argued that the Austroasiatic proto-language had been atonal, and that the development of tones in Vietnamese had been conditioned by these consonants, which had subsequently disappeared, a process now known as tonogenesis. Haudricourt further proposed that tone in the other languages, including Middle Chinese, had a similar origin. Other scholars have since uncovered transcriptional and other evidence for these consonants in early forms of Chinese, and many linguists now believe that Old Chinese was atonal.

Around the end of the first millennium AD, Middle Chinese and the southeast Asian languages experienced a phonemic split of their tone categories. Syllables with voiced initials tended to be pronounced with a lower pitch, and by the late Tang dynasty, each of the tones had split into two registers conditioned by the initials, known as the "upper" and "lower". When voicing was lost in most varieties (except in the Wu and Old Xiang groups and some Gan dialects), this distinction became phonemic, yielding up to eight tonal categories, with a six-way contrast in unchecked syllables and a two-way contrast in checked syllables. Cantonese maintains these tones and has developed an additional distinction in checked syllables, resulting in a total of nine tonal categories. However, most varieties have fewer tonal distinctions. For example, in Mandarin dialects the lower rising category merged with the departing category to form the modern falling tone, leaving a system of four tones. Furthermore, final stop consonants disappeared in most Mandarin dialects, and such syllables were reassigned to one of the other four tones.

=== Changes from Old to Modern Chinese ===
Middle Chinese had a structure similar to many modern varieties, especially conservative ones like Cantonese, with largely monosyllabic words, little or no derivational morphology, three tones, and a syllable structure consisting of initial consonant, glide, main vowel and final consonant, with a large number of initial consonants and a fairly small number of final consonants. Without counting the glide, no clusters could occur at the beginning or end of a syllable.

Old Chinese, on the other hand, had a significantly different structure. There were no tones, a smaller imbalance between possible initial and final consonants, and many initial and final clusters. There was a well-developed system of derivational and possibly inflectional morphology, formed using consonants added onto the beginning or end of a syllable. The system is similar to the system reconstructed for Proto-Sino-Tibetan and still visible, for example, in Classical Tibetan; it is also largely similar to the system that occurs in the more conservative Austroasiatic languages, such as modern Khmer.

The main changes leading to the modern varieties have been a reduction in the number of consonants and vowels and a corresponding increase in the number of tones (typically through a Pan-East-Asiatic tone split that doubled the number of tones and eliminated the distinction between voiced and unvoiced consonants). That has led to a gradual decrease in the number of possible syllables. Standard Mandarin has only about 1,300 possible syllables, and many other varieties of Chinese even fewer (for example, modern Shanghainese has been reported to have only about 700 syllables). The result in Mandarin, for example, has been the proliferation of the number of two-syllable compound words, which have steadily replaced former monosyllabic words; most words in Standard Mandarin now have two syllables.

== Grammar ==
The extensive surviving body of Middle Chinese (MC) literature of various types provides much source material for the study of MC grammar. Due to the lack of morphological development, grammatical analysis of MC tends to focus on the nature and meanings of the individual words themselves and the syntactic rules by which their arrangement together in sentences communicates meaning.

== See also ==
- Karlgren–Li reconstruction of Middle Chinese
- Baxter's transcription for Middle Chinese
