= Li Fang-Kuei =

Chinese-American linguist (1902–1987)

- Born: August 20, 1902; Guangzhou, Guangdong
- Died: 21 August 1987 (aged 85); San Mateo County, California, United States

Academic background
- Education: Tsinghua University; University of Michigan; University of Chicago
- Thesis: Mattole: An Athabaskan Language (1928)
- Doctoral advisor: Edward Sapir

Academic work
- Discipline: Linguistics
- Institutions: Yale University; Harvard University; Academia Sinica; University of Washington; University of Hawaiʻi
- Notable students: W. South Coblin; David R. Knechtges

Chinese name
- Chinese: 李方桂
Transcriptions
Standard Mandarin
- Hanyu Pinyin: Lǐ Fāngguì
- Gwoyeu Romatzyh: Lii Fangguey
- Wade–Giles: Li^{3} Fang^{1}-kuei^{4}
- IPA: [lì fáŋkwêɪ]
Yue: Cantonese
- Yale Romanization: Léih Fōng-gwai
- Jyutping: Lei^{5} Fong^{1}-gwai^{3}

Li Fang-Kuei (Chinese: 李方桂; pinyin: Lǐ Fāngguì; 20 August 1902 – 21 August 1987) was a Chinese-American linguist known for his studies of the varieties of Chinese, his reconstructions of Old Chinese and Proto-Tai, and his documentation of Dene languages in North America.

== Biography ==
Li Fang-Kuei was born on 20 August 1902 in Guangzhou during the final years of the Qing dynasty to a minor scholarly family from Xiyang, a small town in Shanxi roughly 50 kilometers (31 mi) south of Yangquan. Li's father Li Guangyu (李光宇) received his imperial examination degree in 1880, and served in minor official posts in the late 19th to early 20th century.

Li was one of the first Chinese people to study linguistics outside China. Originally a student of medicine, he switched to linguistics when he went to the United States in 1924. He earned a BA in linguistics at the University of Michigan in 1926 after only two years of study. He then did graduate study under Edward Sapir at the University of Chicago, where he was Sapir's first graduate student. From Sapir he learned phonetics, field methods, and American Indian languages. Sapir also encouraged him to study East and Southeast Asian languages, leading to his work on Thai and Sino-Tibetan. Li was also a student of Leonard Bloomfield at this time, from whom Li learned Germanic linguistics and textual analysis. Li also studied Indo-European linguistics, especially Greek and Latin, from Carl Darling Buck at Chicago, and in 1928 Buck secured a 6-month fellowship at Harvard University for him, where he studied Sanskrit and Tibetan.

Li conducted field studies of the indigenous languages of the Americas. His first exposure to fieldwork was his study of the Mattole language of northern California. He received an MA in 1927 and a PhD in 1928. His dissertation Mattole: An Athabaskan Language was published in 1930. Following the completion of his PhD, Li traveled to Europe during 1928–1929 with letters of recommendation from Franz Boas, and visited linguists there including Walter Simon. Li also spent 3 months in 1929 in Canada's Northwest Territories, living on an island in the middle of the Mackenzie River conducting fieldwork on the Hare language.

After his fieldwork on Hare, in 1929 he returned to China and, along with Y. R. Chao and Luo Changpei, became a researcher at the Institute of History and Philology (歷史語言研究所; Lìshǐ yǔyán yánjiūsuǒ) of the Academia Sinica then located at Beijing. From this point on, he performed field studies of several Tai languages, including the Longzhou and Wuming dialects spoken by the Zhuang people, while at the same time conducting deep investigations into Old Chinese and Tibetan. Li's revisions of Bernhard Karlgren's reconstructions of Middle Chinese and Old Chinese were widely used by students of ancient Chinese from their publication in the 1970s until the late 1990s.

Li taught Chinese language and linguistics at Yale University from 1938 to 1939, and after World War II taught at Harvard University from 1946 to 1948. During the same period he was working on a dictionary at the Harvard–Yenching Institute, followed by another year teaching at Yale from 1948 to 1949, where his students included Nicholas Bodman. In 1949, he became professor of Chinese at the University of Washington, where he taught from 1949 to 1969, after which he taught at the University of Hawaiʻi until his retirement in 1974. In 1977, he published a comparative reconstruction of Tai languages, the result of more than forty years of research. He also worked at Academia Sinica, now in Taiwan, in 1973.

Li died in San Mateo County, California, survived by his wife Xu Ying (徐櫻) and their daughter Lindy Li Mark, a professor of anthropology who taught at California State University, Hayward, and the Chinese University of Hong Kong, as well as their son Peter Li and daughter Annie Li. His alma mater Tsinghua University began to publish his complete works in 2005.

== Selected works ==
- Li Fang-Kuei. Mattole: An Athabaskan Language. Chicago: University of Chicago Press, 1930. 152 pages.
- ——— (1933). "Certain Phonetic Influences of the Tibetan Prefixes upon the Root Initials". Bulletin of the Institute of History and Philology 6.2: 135–157.
- ——— (1956a). "The Inscriptions of the Sino-Tibetan Treaty of 821–822". T'oung p'ao 44: 1–99.
- ——— (1971). 上古音研究 [Studies on Archaic Chinese]. The Tsing Hua Journal of Chinese Studies (in Chinese). IX: 1–61.
- ——— (1972), "Language and Dialects in China". Free China Review XXII, No. 5.
- ——— (1974–1975). "Studies on Archaic Chinese". Monumenta Serica. 31. Translated by Mattos, Gilbert L.: 219–287. doi:10.1080/02549948.1974.11731100. JSTOR 40726172. translation of Li (1971).
- ——— (1977). A handbook of comparative Tai. Manoa: University Press of Hawaii. ISBN 978-0-8248-0540-1.
- ——— (1979) "The Chinese Transcription of Tibetan Consonant Clusters". Bulletin of the Institute of History and Philology Academia Sinica 50: 231–240.
- ——— and W. South Coblin (1987). A study of the old Tibetan inscriptions. (Special publications 91.) Taipei: Academia Sinica.
- ——— (1986). Linguistics East and West: American Indian, Sino-Tibetan, and Thai. Berkeley: Bancroft Library, University of California. Interviews conducted by Ning-Ping Chan and Randy La Polla, with an Introduction by George Taylor.

== See also ==
- Karlgren–Li reconstruction of Middle Chinese
