= Qieyun =

Chinese rhyme dictionary

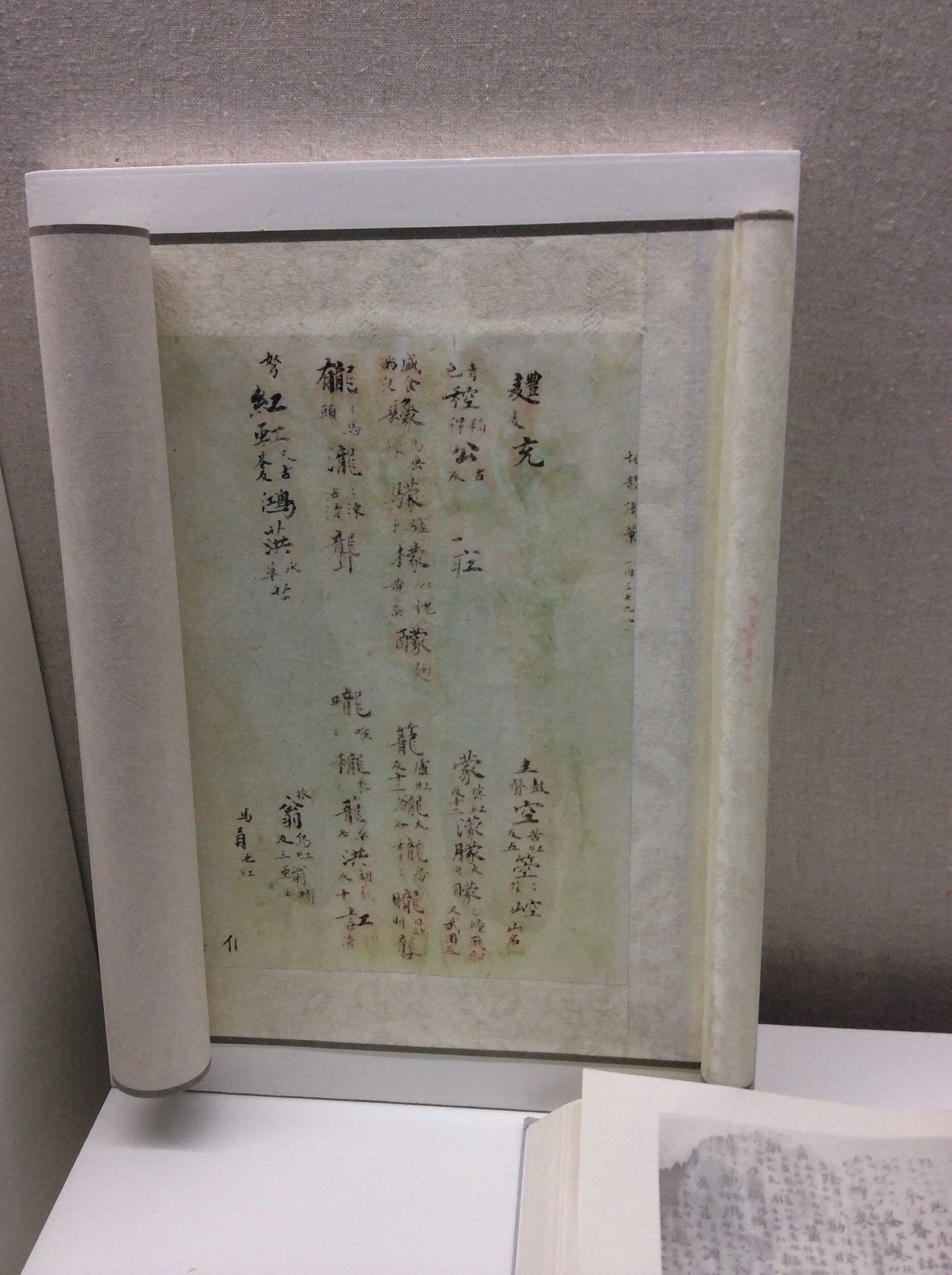
- Qieyun excerpt displayed at the Chinese Dictionary Museum in Jincheng, Shanxi
- Traditional Chinese: 切韻
- Simplified Chinese: 切韵
Transcriptions
Standard Mandarin
- Hanyu Pinyin: Qièyùn
- Gwoyeu Romatzyh: Chiehyunn
- Wade–Giles: Chʻieh^{4}-yün^{4}
- IPA: [tɕʰjê.ŷn]
Wu
- Wugniu: tshiq^{7} yun^{4}
- IPA: Shanghainese: [tɕiɪʔ˧ ɦyn˦]
Yue: Cantonese
- Yale Romanization: Chit wahn
- Jyutping: cit^{3} wan^{5}
- IPA: [tsʰit̚˧.wɐn˨]
Southern Min
- Hokkien POJ: Chhiat-ūn
- Tâi-lô: Tshiat-ūn
Middle Chinese
- Middle Chinese: tshet hjunH (Baxter)

The Qieyun (simplified Chinese: 切韵; traditional Chinese: 切韻; pinyin: Qièyùn) is a Chinese rhyme dictionary that was published in 601 during the Sui dynasty. The book was a guide to proper reading of classical texts, using the fanqie method to indicate the pronunciation of Chinese characters. The Qieyun and later redactions, notably the Guangyun, are important documentary sources used in the reconstruction of historical Chinese phonology.

== History ==
The book was created by Lu Fayan (Lu Fa-yen; 陸法言) in 601. The preface of the Qieyun describes how the plan of the book originated from a discussion with eight of his friends 20 years earlier at his home in Chang'an, the capital of Sui China.

When it grew late and we had been drinking wine for most of the evening, we began discussing the sounds and the rhymes. Modern pronunciations are naturally varied; moreover, those who have written on the sounds and the rhymes have not always been in agreement. ...

So we discussed the rights and wrongs of the North and the South and the comprehensible and incomprehensible of the ancients and moderns. We wanted to select the precise and discard the extraneous, ...

So under the candlelight I took up the brush and jotted down an outline. We consulted each other extensively and argued vigorously. We came close to getting the essence.

— Lu Fayan, Qieyun, preface, translated by S. Robert Ramsey

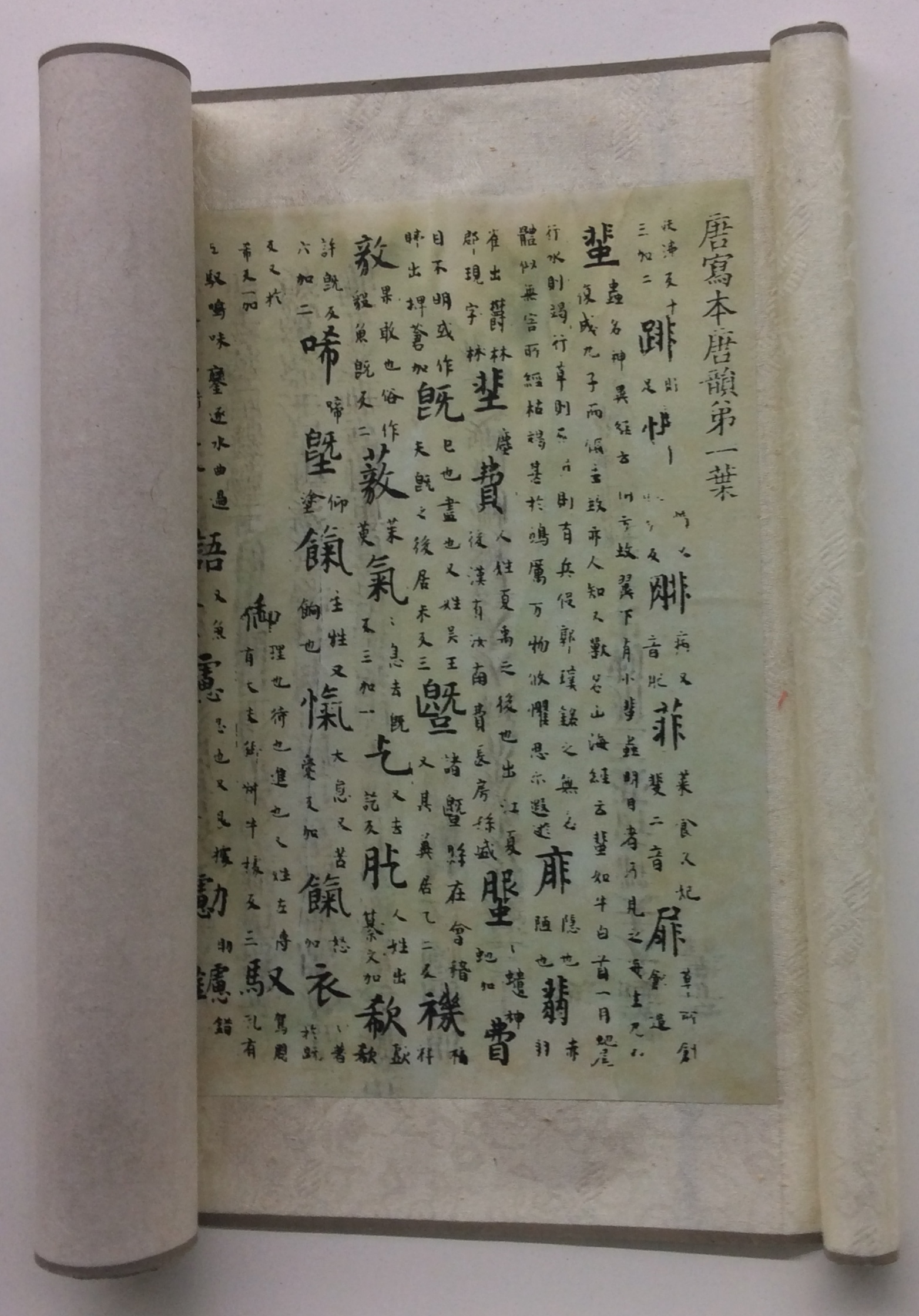
Tangyun excerpt in the Chinese Dictionary Museum

None of these scholars was originally from Chang'an; they were native speakers of differing dialects – five northern and three southern. According to Lu, Yan Zhitui (顏之推) and Xiao Gai (蕭該), both men originally from the south, were the most influential in setting up the norms on which the Qieyun was based. However, the dictionary was compiled by Lu alone, consulting several earlier dictionaries, none of which have survived.

When classical Chinese poetry flowered during the Tang dynasty, the Qieyun became the authoritative source for literary pronunciations and it repeatedly underwent revisions and enlargements. It was annotated in 677 by Zhǎngsūn Nèyán (長孫訥言), revised and published in 706 by Wáng Renxu (王仁煦) as the Kanmiu Buque Qieyun (刊謬補缺切韻; "Corrected and supplemented Qieyun"), collated and republished in 751 by Sun Mian (孫愐) as the Tángyùn (唐韻; "Tang rhymes"), and eventually incorporated into the still-extant Guangyun and Jiyun rhyme dictionaries from the Song dynasty. Although most of these Tang dictionary redactions were believed lost, some fragments were discovered among the Dunhuang manuscripts and manuscripts discovered at Turpan.

The Qieyun reflected the enhanced phonological awareness that developed in China after the advent of Buddhism, which introduced the sophisticated Indian linguistics. The Buddhist Uyghur Kingdom of Qocho used a version of the Qieyun.

During the Tang dynasty, several copyists were engaged in producing manuscripts to meet the great demand for revisions of the work. Particularly prized were copies of Wáng Rénxū's edition made in the early 9th century by Wú Cǎiluán (吳彩鸞), a woman famed for her calligraphy. One of these copies was acquired by Emperor Huizong (1100–1126), himself a keen calligrapher. It remained in the palace library until 1926, when part of the library followed the deposed emperor Puyi to Tianjin and then to Changchun, capital of the puppet state of Manchukuo. After the Japanese surrender in 1945, it passed to a book dealer in Changchun, and in 1947 two scholars discovered it in a book market in Liulichang, Beijing.

Studies of this almost complete copy have been published by the Chinese linguists Dong Tonghe (1948 and 1952) and Li Rong (1956).

== Structure ==
The first entry in the Qieyun

The Qieyun contains 12,158 character entries. These were divided into five volumes, two for the many words of the "level" tone, and one volume for each of the other three tones. The entries were divided into 193 final rhyme groups (each named by its first character, called the yùnmù 韻目, or "rhyme eye"). Each rhyme group was subdivided into homophone groups (xiǎoyùn 小韻 "small rhyme"). The first entry in each homophone group gives the pronunciation as a fanqie formula.

For example, the first entry in the Qieyun, shown at right, describes the character 東 dōng "east". The three characters on the right are a fanqie pronunciation key, marked by the character 反 fǎn "turn back". This indicates that the word is pronounced with the initial of 德 [tək] and the final of 紅 [ɣuŋ], i.e. [tuŋ]. The word is glossed as 木方 mù fāng, i.e. the direction of wood (one of the Five Elements), while the numeral 二 "two" indicates that this is the first of two entries in a homophone group.

Later rhyme dictionaries had many more entries, with full definitions and a few additional rhyme groups, but kept the same structure.

The Qieyun did not directly record Middle Chinese as a spoken language, but rather prescribed standard pronunciations for characters to be used when reading the classics. Linguists have disagreed over what variety of Chinese the dictionary recorded. "Much ink has been spilled concerning the nature of the language underlying the Qieyun," says Norman (1988: 24), who lists three points of view. Some scholars, like Bernhard Karlgren, "held to the view that the Qieyun represented the language of Chang'an"; some "others have supposed that it represented an amalgam of regional pronunciations," technically known as a diasystem. "At the present time, most people in the field accept the views of the Chinese scholar Zhou Zumo" (周祖謨; 1914–1995) that Qieyun spellings were a north–south regional compromise between literary pronunciations from the Northern and Southern dynasties.

== See also ==
- Rime table
- Peiwen Yunfu
