= William H. Baxter =

American linguist

- Born: March 3, 1949 (age 77); New York City, New York, U.S.
- Education: Amherst College (BA); Cornell University (MA, PhD)
- Known for: Reconstruction of Old Chinese
- Scientific career
- Fields: Sinology; Linguistics
- Workplaces: University of Michigan
- Doctoral advisor: Nicholas Bodman

Chinese name
- Chinese: 白一平
Transcriptions
Standard Mandarin
- Hanyu Pinyin: Bái Yīpíng
- IPA: [pǎɪ í.pʰǐŋ]
Yue: Cantonese
- Yale Romanization: Baahk Yātpìhng
- Jyutping: baak6 jat1 ping4
- IPA: [pak̚˨ yɐt̚˥.pʰɪŋ˩]
Middle Chinese
- Middle Chinese: baek 'jit-bjaeng
Old Chinese
- Baxter–Sagart (2014): /*bˤrak ʔi[t].m-breŋ/

William Hubbard Baxter III (Chinese: 白一平; pinyin: Bái Yīpíng; born March 3, 1949) is an American sinologist and linguist specializing in the history of the Chinese language. He is best known for his work on the reconstruction on Old Chinese.

== Biography ==
After graduating from Amherst College, Baxter earned an M.A. and his Ph.D. in linguistics in 1977 from Cornell University. In 1983, he joined the University of Michigan, where he is currently a professor of linguistics and Asian languages and cultures.

Baxter's A Handbook of Old Chinese Phonology is the standard reference for the reconstruction of Old Chinese phonology. Together with Laurent Sagart at the Centre National de la Recherche Scientifique in Paris, he has produced an improved reconstruction of the pronunciation, vocabulary, and morphology of Old Chinese. A reconstruction for nearly 5000 words has been published online. In 2016, Baxter and Sagart were awarded the Leonard Bloomfield Book Award by the Linguistic Society of America for their 2014 book Old Chinese: A New Reconstruction.

== Publications ==
- Baxter, William; Sagart, Laurent (2014). Old Chinese: A New Reconstruction. Oxford University Press. ISBN 978-0-19-994537-5.
- Sagart, Laurent, and William H. Baxter (2012). Reconstructing the *s- prefix in Old Chinese. Language and Linguistics 13: 29–59.
- Shā Jiā’ěr 沙加尔 [Laurent Sagart] and Bái Yīpíng 白一平 [William H. Baxter] (2010). Shànggǔ Hànyǔ de N- hé m- qiánzhuì 上古汉语的 N- 和 m- 前缀. Hàn-Zàng yǔ xuébào 汉藏语学报 [Journal of Sino-Tibetan Linguistics] 4: 62–69.
- Bái Yīpíng 白一平 [William H. Baxter] (2010). "'Yì', 'shì' 'shè' děng zì de gòunǐ hé zhōnggǔ sy- (shūmǔ = shěnsān) de láiyuán" “埶”, “勢”, “設” 等字的構擬和中古 sy-（書母 = 審三） 的來源 . Jiǎnbó 簡帛 5: 161–178.
- Sagart, Laurent, and William H. Baxter (2009). Reconstructing Old Chinese uvulars in the Baxter–Sagart system (version 0.99). Cahiers de linguistique Asie orientale 38: 221–244.
- Baxter, William W. (2006). "Mandarin dialect phylogeny". Cahiers de Linguistique Asie Orientale. 35: 71–114. doi:10.3406/clao.2006.1748.
- Baxter, William W. (2006). "Eulogy: Sergej Anatol′evič Starostin, March 24, 1953 – September 30, 2005". Journal of Chinese Linguistics. 34 (1): 164–166.
- Baxter, William H. (2002). "Where does the 'Comparative Method' come from?". In Fabrice Cavoto (ed.). The linguist's linguist: a collection of papers in honour of Alexis Manaster Ramer. Munich: LINCOM EUROPA. pp. 33–52.
- (2000) (with Alexis Manaster Ramer) Beyond lumping and splitting: probabilistic issues in historical linguistics. In Time depth in historical linguistics, ed. by Colin Renfrew, April McMahon & Larry Trask, 167–188. Cambridge: McDonald Institute for Archaeological Research.
- Baxter, William W. (2000). "Did Proto-Mandarin exist?". Journal of Chinese Linguistics. 28: 100–115.
- (1999) "Reconstructing Proto-'Mandarin' retroflex initials". In Issues in Chinese dialect description and classification (Journal of Chinese Linguistics Monographs, 15), ed. by Richard VanNess Simmons, 1–35. Berkeley: Project on Linguistic Analysis.
- (1999) Eulogy: Nicholas C. Bodman (1913–1997). Journal of Chinese Linguistics 27: 190–191.
- (1998) Response to Oswalt and Ringe. In Nostratic: Sifting the Evidence, ed. by Joseph C. Salmons and Brian D. Joseph, 217–236. Amsterdam: Benjamins.
- (1998) Situating the language of the Lao-tzu: the probable date of the Tao-te-ching. In Lao-tzu and the Tao-te-ching, ed. by Livia Kohn and Michael LaFargue, 231–253. Albany: State University Press of New York, 1998.
- (1997) (with Laurent Sagart) Word formation in Old Chinese. In New approaches to Chinese word formation, ed. by Jerome Packard, 35–76. Berlin: Mouton de Gruyter.
- (1996) Review (with Alexis Manaster Ramer) of Donald A. Ringe, Jr., On calculating the factor of chance in language comparison (Philadelphia: American Philosophical Society, 1992), Diachronica 13: 371–384.
- (1995) "'A stronger affinity … than could have been produced by accident': a probabilistic comparison of Old Chinese and Tibeto-Burman". In The Ancestry of the Chinese Language (Journal of Chinese Linguistics Monographs, 8), ed. by William S-Y. Wang, 1–39. Berkeley: Project on Linguistic Analysis.
- (1995) "Pre-Qièyùn distinctions in the Mǐn dialects". In Papers from the First International Symposium on Languages in Taiwan (Dì 1 jiè Táiwān yǔyán guójì yántǎo huì lùnwén xuǎnjí 第一屆臺灣 語言國際研討會論文選集) ed. by Ts’ao Feng-fu 曹逢甫 and Ts’ai Mei-hui 蔡美慧, 393–406. Taipei: Crane Publishing.
- (1994) Guānyú Shànggǔyīn de sìge jiǎshè 關於上古音的四個假設 (Four hypotheses on Old Chinese phonology). In Zhōngguó jìngnèi yǔyán jì yǔyánxué 中國境內語言暨語言學 (Chinese languages and linguistics), vol. 2: Lìshǐ yǔyánxué 歷史語言學 (Historical linguistics), ed. by Li Jen-kuei 李壬癸, Huang Chu-ren 黃居仁, and T’ang Chih-chen 湯志真, 41–60. Taipei: Institute of History and Philology, Academia Sinica.
- (1994) Reply to Pulleyblank. Journal of Chinese Linguistics 22: 139–160
- (1994) Some phonological correspondences between Chinese and Tibeto-Burman. In Current issues in Sino-Tibetan Linguistics, ed. by Hajime Kitamura, Tatsuo Nishida, and Yasuhiko Nagano, 25–35. Osaka: The Organizing Committee, The 26th International Conference on Sino-Tibetan Languages and Linguistics.
- (1993) Review of Johanna Nichols, Linguistic diversity in space and time (Chicago: University of Chicago Press, 1992), Science 259: 1927–8 (26 March 1993).
- (1993) Pre-Qieyun distinctions in the Min dialects. First International Symposium on Languages in Taiwan, Taipei.
- (1992) A handbook of Old Chinese phonology. Berlin: Mouton de Gruyter, 1992.
- (1991) Zhōu and Hàn phonology in the Shījīng. In Studies in the historical phonology of Asian languages (Current issues in linguistic theory, 77), ed. by William G. Boltz and Michael C. Shapiro, 1–34. Amsterdam: John Benjamins.
- (1991) On the hypothesis of a genetic connection between the Sino-Tibetan languages and the Yeniseian and North-Caucasian languages’ (annotated translation of Sergei Starostin’s ‘Gipoteza o genetičeskix svjazjax sinotibetskix jazykov s enisejskimi i severno-kavkazskimi jazykami’). In Dene-Sino-Caucasian languages: materials from the First International Interdisciplinary Symposium on Language and Prehistory, Ann Arbor, 8–12 November 1988, edited by Vitaly Shevoroshkin. Bochum: Brockmeyer.
- (1989) Review of Marie-Claude Paris, Problèmes de syntaxe et de sémantique en linguistique chinoise, Mémoires de l’Institut des Hautes Études Chinoises, vol. 20 (Paris: Collège de France, Institut des Hautes Études Chinoises, 1981). Journal of the Chinese Language Teachers Association 24: 111–118
- (1987) Review of E. G. Pulleyblank, Middle Chinese: a study in historical phonology (Vancouver: University of British Columbia Press, 1984). Harvard Journal of Asiatic Studies 47.635–656.
- (1986) Old Chinese *-u and *-iw in the Shi-jing. In Contributions to Sino-Tibetan studies (Cornell linguistic contributions, 5), ed. by John McCoy and Timothy Light, 258–282. Leiden: E. J. Brill.
- (1986) Chinese and Japanese CAI at the University of Michigan. Journal of the Chinese Language Teachers Association 21: 19–26.
- (1985) Tibeto-Burman cognates of Old Chinese *-ij and *-ɨj. In Linguistics of the Sino-Tibetan area: the state of the art—papers presented to Paul K. Benedict for his 71st birthday (Pacific linguistics, series C, no. 87), ed. by Graham Thurgood, James A. Matisoff, and David Bradley, 242–263. Canberra: The Australian National University.
- (1985) Language and language policy in Singapore. Social Education 49: 116–117 (1985).
- (1985) Review of W. South Coblin, A handbook of Eastern Han sound glosses (Hong Kong: The Chinese University Press, 1983). Bulletin of the School of Oriental and African Studies 48.170–171.
- (1984) Formal semantics of a fragment of Chinese. Journal of the Chinese Language Teachers Association 19: 37–52.
- (1983) A look at the history of Chinese color terminology. Journal of the Chinese Language Teachers Association 18(2): 1–25.
- (1983) Shànggǔ Hànyǔ *sr- de fāzhǎn 上古汉语 *sr- 的发展’ (The development of Old Chinese *sr–). Yǔyán Yánjiū 语言研究 (Wǔhàn) 4: 22–26.
- (1982) Review of Paul Fu-Mien Yang, Chinese dialectology: a selected and classified bibliography (Hong Kong: The Chinese University Press, 1981). Journal of Asian Studies 41: 158–159.
- (1982) Some proposals on Old Chinese phonology. In Contributions in historical linguistics: issues and materials (Cornell linguistic contributions, 3), ed. by Frans van Coetsem and Linda R. Waugh, 1–33. Leiden: E. J. Brill.

== See also ==
- Baxter's transcription for Middle Chinese
