= Guangyun =

Chinese rhyme dictionary compiled during the Song dynasty

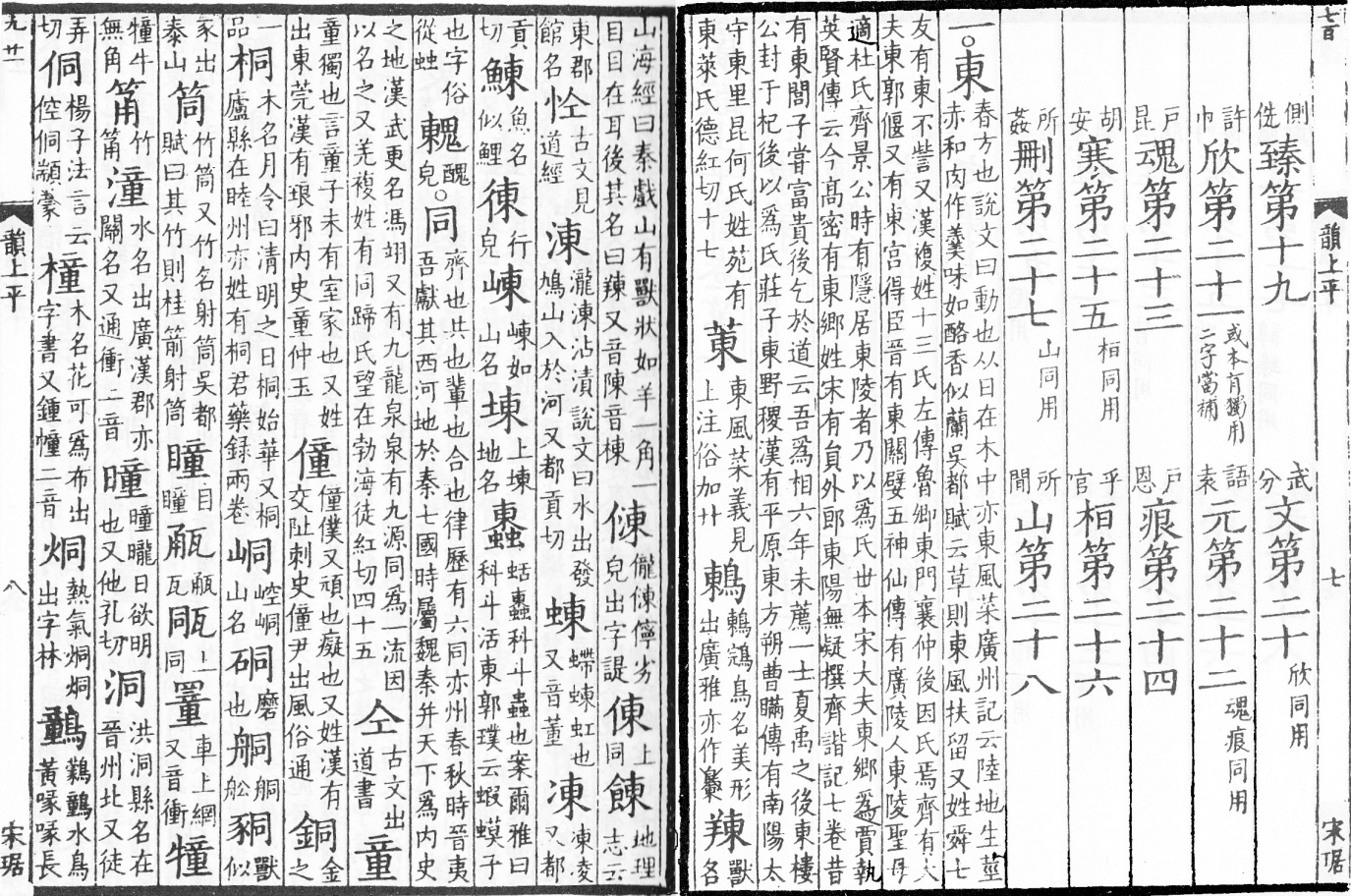
The beginning of the first rhyme group of the Guangyun, with first character 東 ("east")

The Guangyun (Kuang-yun; traditional Chinese: 廣韻; simplified Chinese: 广韵; pinyin: Guǎngyùn; Wade–Giles: Kuang^{3}-yün^{4}; lit. 'Broad Rhymes') is a Chinese rhyme dictionary that was compiled from 1007 to 1008 under the patronage of Emperor Zhenzong of Song. Its full name was Dà Sòng chóngxiū guǎngyùn (大宋重修廣韻, literally "Great Song revised and expanded rhymes"). Chen Pengnian (陳彭年, 961–1017) and Qiu Yong (邱雍) were the chief editors.

The dictionary is a revision and expansion of the influential Qieyun rhyme dictionary of 601, and was itself later revised as the Jiyun. Pingshui Yun system, the standard for poetry rhyming after the Song Dynasty, is also based on Guangyun. Until the discovery of an almost complete early 8th century edition of the Qieyun in 1947, the Guangyun was the most accurate available account of the Qieyun phonology, and was heavily used in early work on the reconstruction of Middle Chinese. It is still used as a major source.

The Guangyun has a similar hierarchical organization to the Qieyun:

- The dictionary is split into four tones in five volumes, two for the Middle Chinese level tone (平聲) and one each for the three oblique tones, rising (上聲), departing (去聲) and entering (入聲).
- Each tone is split into rhymes, with a total of 206 final rhymes, increased from 193 in the Qieyun.
- Each rhyme is divided into groups of homophonous characters, with the pronunciation of each group given by a fanqie formula.

The dictionary has a total of 26,194 character entries, each containing a brief explanation of the character's meaning.

The Unihan database incorporates the "SBGY" (Songben Guangyun; "Song edition Guangyun") dataset with 25,334 head-entries for 19,583 characters.

== Table of Consonants ==
Table of Consonants in the Guangyun Sound System
Location			Manner											
Traditional Terms		Modern Terms	Traditional Terms	Unvoiced Unaspirated			Unvoiced Aspirated		Voiced			Nasal		
Traditional Terms		Modern Terms	Modern Terms	Unaspirated			Aspirated		Voiced			Nasal	Lateral	Semivowels
Traditional Terms		Modern Terms	Modern Terms	Stops	Affricates	Fricatives	Stops	Affricates	Stops	Affricates	Fricatives	Nasal	Lateral	Semivowels
Labial	Bilabials	Bilabial	p				pʰ		b			m		
Labial	Labiodentals	Labiodental			pf			pfʰ		bv		ɱ		
Alveolar	Dental stops	Dental stops	t				tʰ		d			n		
Alveolar	Retroflex stops	Palatal	ȶ				ȶʰ		ȡ			ȵ		
Lateral	Dental affricates	Anterior coronal			ts	s		sʰ		dz	z			
Lateral	Retroflex/ Alveolo-palatal affricates	Tongue blade			tʃ	ʃ		tʃʰ		dʒ				
Lateral	Retroflex/ Alveolo-palatal affricates	Palatal			tɕ	ɕ		tɕʰ		dʑ	ʒ			
Velars		Guttural	k				kʰ		g			ŋ		
Glottal		Glottal	ʔ											
Glottal		Guttural				x					ɣ			
Glottal		Laminal												j
Half dental lateral		Alveolar											l	
Half retroflex		Palatal										ȵ, ʑ		

== Bibliography ==
- JACQUES, Guillaume (2015). "Traditional Chinese Phonology". In Sybesma, Rint (ed.). Encyclopedia of Chinese Language and Linguistics. Brill.
- Li, Jialong (李加龙) (2017). Hànyǔ Fāngyán Diàochá 汉语方言调查 [Chinese Phonological Research]. Beijing: The Commercial Press. ISBN 978-7-100-12869-8.
