= Bernhard Karlgren =

Swedish sinologist and linguist (1889–1978)

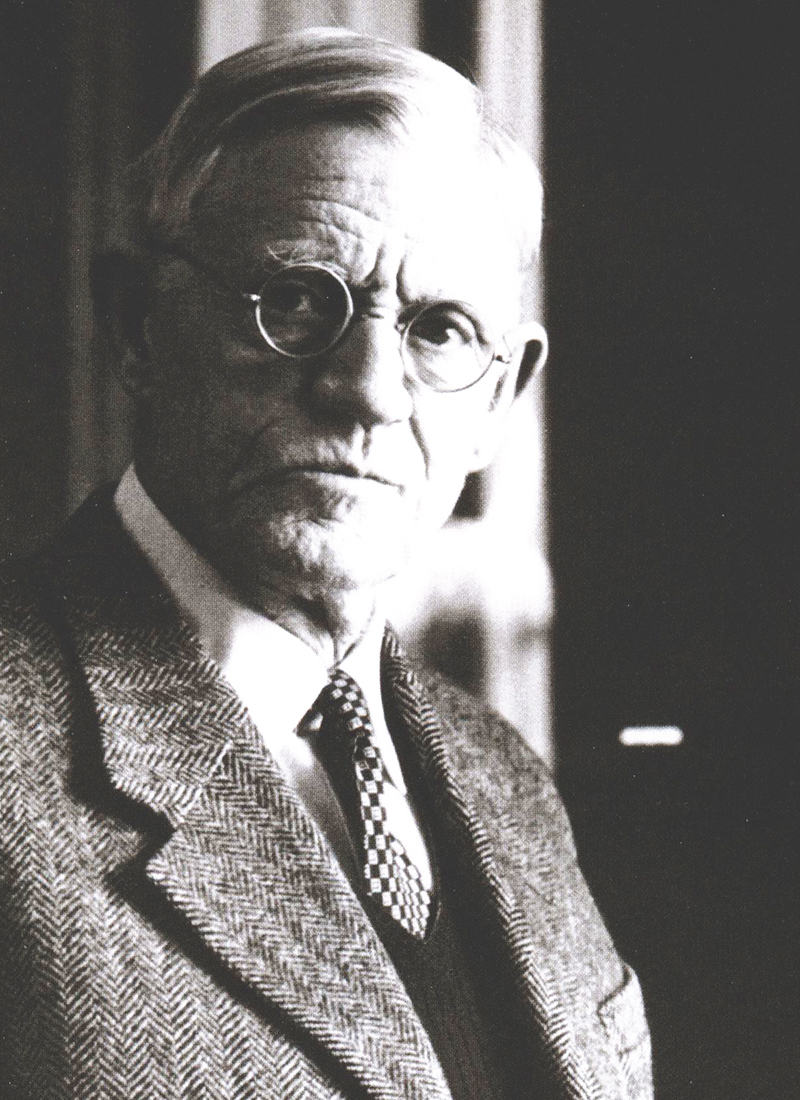
- Born: 15 October 1889; Jönköping, Sweden-Norway
- Died: 20 October 1978 (aged 89); Stockholm, Sweden
- Education: Uppsala University
- Known for: Pioneering reconstructions of Middle Chinese and Old Chinese
- Scientific career
- Fields: Ancient Chinese linguistics, literature
- Institutions: Museum of Far Eastern Antiquities; University of Gothenburg
- Thesis: Études sur la phonologie chinoise (1915, 'Studies on Chinese Phonology')
- Academic advisors: Johan August Lundell
- Notable students: Hans Bielenstein; Göran Malmqvist

Chinese name
- Traditional Chinese: 高本漢
- Simplified Chinese: 高本汉
- Hanyu Pinyin: Gāo Běnhàn
Transcriptions
Standard Mandarin
- Hanyu Pinyin: Gāo Běnhàn
- Bopomofo: ㄍㄠ ㄅㄣˇ ㄏㄢˋ
- Gwoyeu Romatzyh: Gau Beenhann
- Wade–Giles: Kao^{1} Pên^{3}-han^{4}
- Tongyong Pinyin: Gao Běnhàn
- Yale Romanization: Gāu Běnhàn
- MPS2: Gāu Běn-hàn
- IPA: [káʊ pə̀n.xân]

Klas Bernhard Johannes Karlgren (Swedish pronunciation: [ˈbæ̌ːɳaɖ ˈkɑ̂ːɭɡreːn]; 15 October 1889 – 20 October 1978) was a Swedish sinologist and linguist who pioneered the study of Chinese historical phonology using modern comparative methods. In the early 20th century, Karlgren conducted large surveys of the varieties of Chinese and studied historical information on rhyming in ancient Chinese poetry, then used them to create the first ever complete reconstructions of what are now called Middle Chinese and Old Chinese.

== Early life and education ==
Bernhard Karlgren was born on 15 October 1889 in Jönköping, Sweden. His father, Johannes Karlgren, taught Latin, Greek, and Swedish at the local high school. Karlgren showed ability in linguistics from a young age, and was interested in Sweden's dialects and traditional folk stories. He mastered classical languages and was an accomplished translator of Greek poetry into his native language. He displayed an early interest in China, and wrote a drama, The White Hind, set in that country in his early teens. His first scholarly article, a phonetic transcription, based on a system devised by Johan August Lundell, of traditional folk stories from his native province of Småland, was completed when he was 14, and published in 1908 when he was only 18 years old. He studied Russian at Uppsala University under Johan August Lundell, a Slavicist interested in comparative linguistics. He graduated in 1909 with a bachelor's degree in Nordic, Greek, and Slavonic languages. Although he initially intended to specialize in the Scandinavian languages, on the advice of his elder brother Anton Karlgren (1882–1973) he decided to focus on Chinese instead, attracted to it also by the fact that, as Lundell had told him, Chinese contained a great number of dialects. He departed for St. Petersburg, which, under the guidance of Vasily Vasilyev, had created one of the major European centres for the study of Chinese. While there, Karlgren, studying under A. I. Ivanov, won a grant to study Chinese dialects, even though he had no background in Chinese at that point.

Karlgren lived in China from 1910 to 1912. He achieved basic fluency and literacy after only a few months of study, and prepared a questionnaire of 3,100 Chinese characters to gather information on Chinese dialects. After his grant money ran out, Karlgren supported himself by teaching French and, famously, English, which, according to one anecdote, he had never been taught but had picked up from English-speaking passengers on the ship from Europe to China. In fact he had received a high credit in English in his final High School exams. He eventually gathered data on 19 different Mandarin dialects, as well as Shanghainese, the Fuzhou dialect of Eastern Min, and Cantonese, plus the Vietnamese and Japanese pronunciations of the characters in his questionnaire.

== Career ==
Karlgren returned to Europe in January 1912, first staying in London, then in Paris, before arriving in Uppsala in his home country of Sweden, where in 1915 he produced his doctoral dissertation, Études sur la phonologie chinoise ('Studies on Chinese Phonology'). Although his dissertation was written in French, most of his subsequent scholarly works were in English. After obtaining his doctorate, Karlgren taught at the University of Gothenburg, serving as its rector from 1931 to 1936.

In 1939, Karlgren succeeded Johan Gunnar Andersson as director of the Museum of Far Eastern Antiquities (Östasiatiska Museet), a post he held until 1959. This public museum was founded in 1926 on Andersson's pioneering discoveries of prehistoric archaeology made in China in the 1920s, and later expanded to cover later periods as well as other parts of Asia. Karlgren had been in close contact with Andersson for many years, and also succeeded Andersson as editor of the museum's journal, the Bulletin of the Museum of Far Eastern Antiquities (BMFEA, 1929–) and continued in this position until the 1970s. Karlgren himself first published many of his own major works in this annual journal, or as books in the monograph series of the museum.

In 1946, Karlgren began a far-reaching attack on the then rather loosely argued historiography of ancient China. Reviewing the literature on China's pre-Han history in his article Legends and Cults in Ancient China, he pointed out that "a common feature to most of these treatises is a curious lack of critical method in the handling of the material". In particular, Karlgren criticised the unselective use of documents from different ages when reconstructing China's ancient history. "In this way very full and detailed accounts have been arrived at—but accounts that are indeed caricatures of scientifically established ones."

In 1950, Karlgren was inducted into the Royal Netherlands Academy of Arts and Sciences.

== Death and legacy ==
Karlgren died on 20 October 1978 in Stockholm at age 89.

Karlgren was the first scholar to use European-style principles of historical linguistics to study the Chinese language. He was also the first to reconstruct the sounds of what are now called Middle Chinese and Old Chinese (what he called "Ancient Chinese" and "Archaic Chinese" respectively). Karlgren suggested that at the very earliest stage recoverable, the personal pronouns were declined for case.

Karlgren attempted to unearth Chinese history itself from its linguistic development and diffusion. As he writes in his English adaptation Sound and Symbol in Chinese (1923), Chapter I: "Thus, though Chinese traditions give no hint whatever of an immigration from any foreign country, and though there consequently is no external chronological point d'appui, we are nonetheless able to state, from internal evidence, that the Chinese tradition which places the reign of the emperor Yao in the twenty-fourth century B.C. is correct; that the Chinese even in those remote times were skilled astronomers; that they put down in writing in the Chinese language records of memorable events, and in all probability wrote their accounts soon after the events; in short, that a well-developed Chinese civilization—resting undoubtedly on foundations many centuries old—together with the Chinese language, existed on Chinese soil two thousand years before Christ."

Although important as a pioneer of historical Chinese linguistics, Karlgren's original findings have been surpassed. Today the phonological systems proposed by Karlgren have largely been superseded, as their weaknesses are obvious: "Karlgren saw himself as reconstructing phonetics, not phonology, and paid little attention to phonological structure. As a result, the systems he reconstructed often lack the symmetry and pattern which are in the phonological systems of natural languages." Nevertheless, Karlgren's groundbreaking works laid the foundation of modern Chinese historical linguistics and many of his works are still used as works of reference.

== Awards and decorations ==
- (Sweden) Commander Grand Cross of the Order of the Polar Star (23 November 1961)

== Selected works ==
- — (1915). Études sur la phonologie chinoise (Doctoral thesis). University of Uppsala. hdl:10111/UIUCBB:karlbe0001etusur.
- — (1918). Ordet och Pennan i Mittens Rike. Adapted as Sound and symbol in Chinese, London: Oxford University Press, 1923. Reprinted 2007: Toronto: Global Language Press, ISBN 978-0-9738924-0-6.
- — (1922). "The reconstruction of Ancient Chinese". T'oung Pao. 21: 1–42. doi:10.1163/156853222X00015.
- — (1923). Analytic Dictionary of Chinese and Sino-Japanese. Paris: Paul Geuthner. Reprinted by Dover Publications, ISBN 978-0-486-21887-8.
- — (1929). "The Authenticity of Ancient Chinese Texts". Bulletin of the Museum of Far Eastern Antiquities. 1: 165–183.
- — (1931a). "The Early History of the Chou Li and Tso Chuan Texts". Bulletin of the Museum of Far Eastern Antiquities. 3: 1–59.
- — (1931b). "Tibetan and Chinese". T'oung Pao. Second Series. 28 (1–2): 25–70. doi:10.1163/156853231X00024. JSTOR 4526964.
- — (1933). "Word Families in Chinese". Bulletin of the Museum of Far Eastern Antiquities. 5: 9–120.
- — (1937). "New Studies on Chinese Bronzes". Bulletin of the Museum of Far Eastern Antiquities. 9: 9–117.
- — (1940). "Grammata Serica, Script and Phonetics in Chinese and Sino-Japanese". Bulletin of the Museum of Far Eastern Antiquities. 12: 1–471.
- — (1941). "Huai and Han". Bulletin of the Museum of Far Eastern Antiquities. 13: 1–125.
- — (1942). "Glosses on the Kuo Feng Odes". Bulletin of the Museum of Far Eastern Antiquities. 14: 71–247.
- — (1944). "Glosses on the Siao ya odes". Bulletin of the Museum of Far Eastern Antiquities. 16: 25–139.
- — (1946a). "Glosses on the Ta Ya and Sung Odes". Bulletin of the Museum of Far Eastern Antiquities. 18: 1–198.
- — (1946b). "Legends and Cults in Ancient China". Bulletin of the Museum of Far Eastern Antiquities. 18: 199–365.
- — (1950). "The Book of Documents". Bulletin of the Museum of Far Eastern Antiquities. 22: 1–81.
- — (1954). "Compendium of Phonetics in Ancient and Archaic Chinese". Bulletin of the Museum of Far Eastern Antiquities. 26: 211–367.
- — (1957). "Grammata Serica Recensa". Bulletin of the Museum of Far Eastern Antiquities. 29: 1–332.

In Swedish he published numerous popular works on Chinese language, culture and history. In the 1940s, he published three novels under the pen name Klas Gullman.

== See also ==
- Grammata Serica Recensa
- Karlgren–Li reconstruction of Middle Chinese

== Notes ==
Footnotes

Works cited

- Baxter, William H. (1992). A Handbook of Old Chinese Phonology. Berlin, New York: Mouton de Gruyer.
- Bielenstein, Hans (1979). "Bernhard Karlgren (1889–1978)". Journal of the American Oriental Society. 99 (3): 553. JSTOR 602522.
- Malmqvist, Göran (1979). "Bernhard Karlgren in Memoriam". Journal of Chinese Linguistics. 7 (1): 142–3. JSTOR 23753040.
- ——— (2011). Bernhard Karlgren: Portrait of a Scholar. Bethlehem, PA; Lanham, MD: Lehigh University Press; Rowman & Littlefield. ISBN 978-1-61146-001-8. Translation of Göran Malmqvist, Bernhard Karlgren: ett forskarporträtt [Bernhard Karlgren: Portrait of a Scholar], Stockholm: Norstedts. 1995.
- Ramsey, S. Robert (1987). The Languages of China. Princeton: Princeton University Press.
