= Prehistoric Chinese religions =

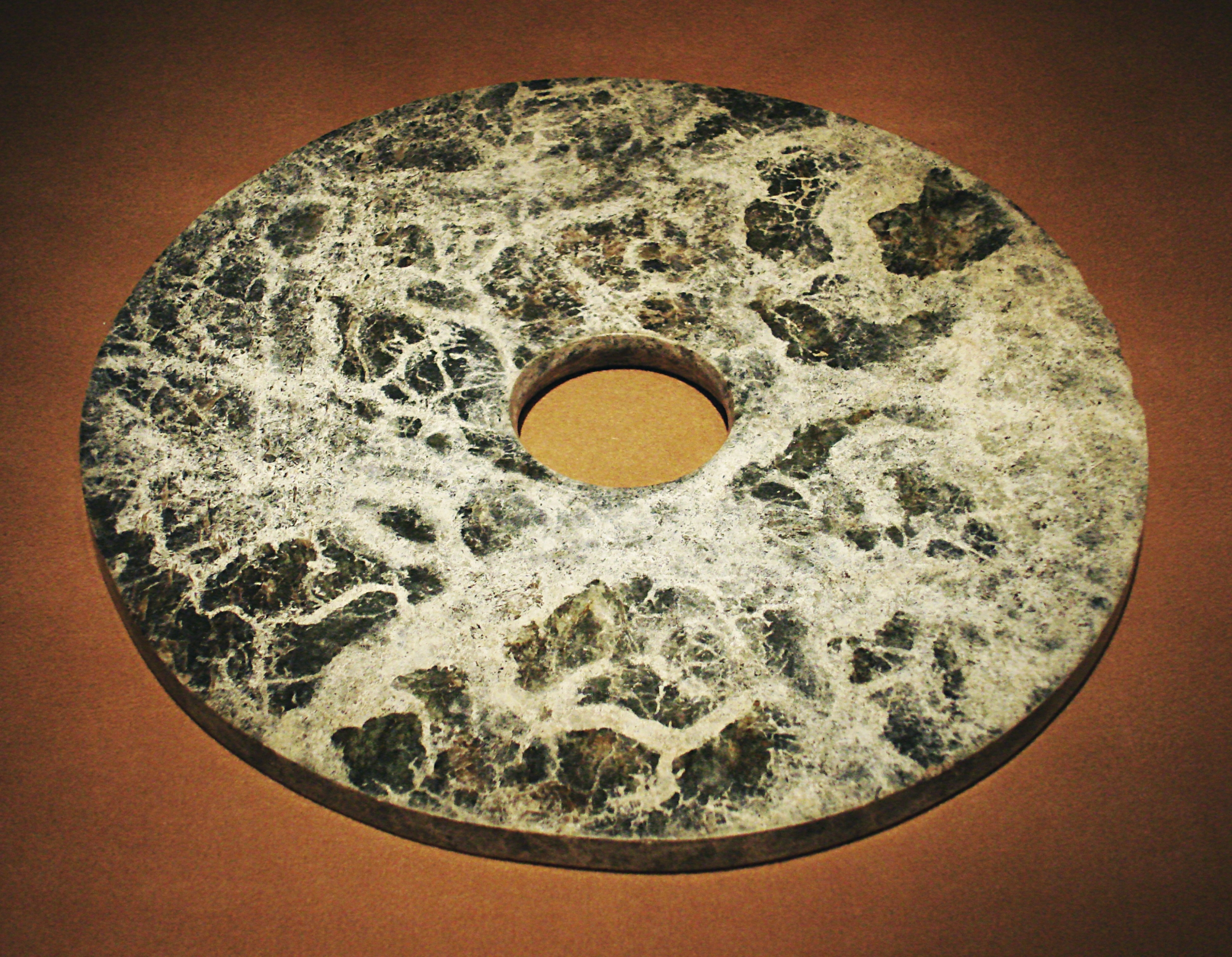
Jade bi disk, a ritual object from the Liangzhu culture which had an established ritual system

Prehistoric Chinese religions are religious beliefs and practices of prehistoric peoples in China prior to the earliest intelligible writings in the region (c. 1250 BCE). They most prominently comprise spiritual traditions of Neolithic and early Bronze Age cultures in various regions of China, which preceded the ancient religions documented during early Chinese dynasties. While many of these cultures shared similar faith and practices, each developed distinct features in its religious life. Modern studies of these religions are obstructed by the absence of contemporary written records.

Neolithic cultures in China appeared in various regions across the country. An early culture was the Peiligang (c. 7000 – 5000 BCE), of which the Jiahu site was regarded as a prominent variation. Around the fifth millennium BCE, many cultures such as Yangshao appeared and left behind various sites that allow investigations into their religious life. During the fourth and third millennia BCE, the Liangzhu culture flourished in the Yangtze River valley, while the Yellow River valley saw the development of cultures such as Dawenkou, Longshan, and Hongshan. These cultures are characterized by extensive traditions which indicate beliefs reminiscent of the posterior religion of the Shang dynasty (c. 1600 – 1046 BCE).

Around the late third and early second millennia BCE, Bronze Age sites emerged in China. Sites such as Erlitou entered a more advanced sociopolitical system and approached the definition of a state. As social stratification was increasingly integrated, evidences for ancestor worship appeared more clearly. The Erlitou site is widely regarded among Chinese academics as the site of the Xia dynasty which upheld traditional Chinese religion, despite inadequate evidence for the conflation. Abundant evidence for human sacrificial rituals also appeared during the early Bronze Age in China.

Many religious beliefs and practices of prehistoric China are claimed to be precursors of the Shang religion, which in turn influenced Chinese civilization. Certain traits such as animism, ancestor veneration and pyromancy characteristic of the Shang are found to be existent during the Neolithic and Bronze Age. Some practices, particularly ancestor worship, were among the prehistoric traditions that influenced modern Chinese life.

== Overview of Chinese prehistory ==
Several Paleolithic sites in China have been dated to as early as 1.66 million years ago, with the existence of early humans such as the Peking Man, a Homo erectus that lived approximately 770 thousand years before present. The earliest examples of religion might have appeared during the Chinese Paleolithic, based on evidence collected at the Zhoukoudian site which has been interpreted as a sign for ritual cannibalism. However, later analysis has challenged that belief.

=== Modern studies ===
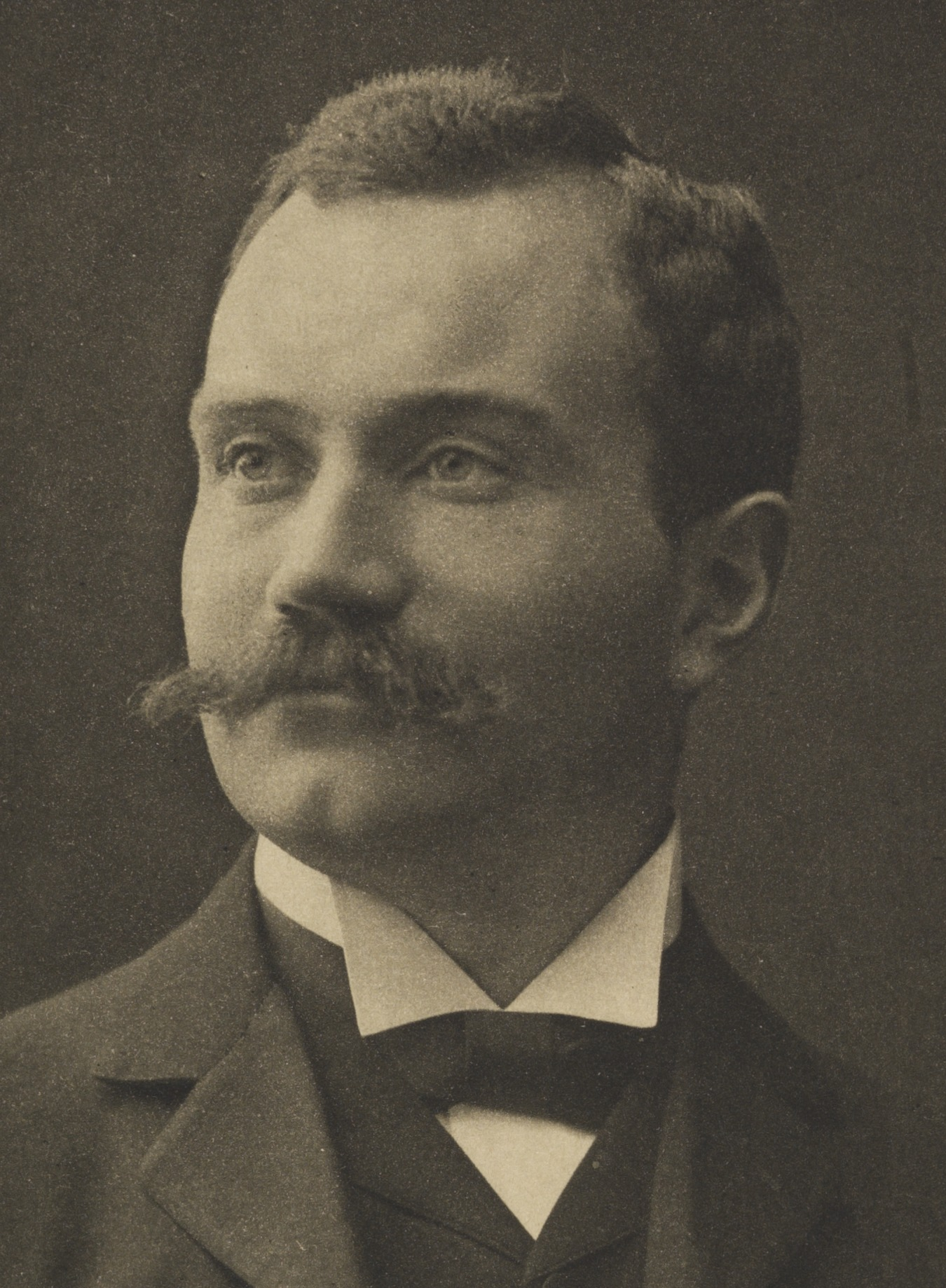
Swedish geologist Johan Andersson, discoverer of the Yangshao culture

The traditional Chinese viewed the cultural formation of China as a continuous expansion of civilization from the Central Plain to the frontier areas regarded as 'barbarian' lands. This view resulted from traditional Chinese historiography which represented unitary political states. The location of the early Yangshao culture, discovered in 1921 by Johan G. Andersson, used to be thought of as evidence for this observation.

Modern studies of the Chinese past were influenced by various schools of thought, such as Marxist historiography in China and universal social evolution in the West. Some scholars applied the theory of human evolution from tribes to chiefdoms and states, identifying certain cultures in China as having social organizations falling within these categories. In the 1970s, a more complex view put the traditional cradle of Chinese civilization on equal grounds with many other regions regarding contribution to early China's formation. Although the theory formed independently, it bears strong similarities to new Western contemporary theories of social development, and thus received support from the West.

=== Neolithic cultures ===
Location of the Peiligang culture

By its definition as the involvement of agriculture in society, the Neolithic period in China began at different times in the many regions. The cultivation of rice in southern China used to be theorized to have begun around 5000 BCE, but more recent research has put the starting date back to as early as 7500 BCE; some examples of rice farming in the Yangtze River valley were even dated to 8000 years ago. In Jiangxi, evidences suggest that even during 10000 BCE the site of Diaotonghuan had already been transitioning from a wild rice gathering society to a rice farming one. Southern China was also known for early pottery-making, which appeared around the 12th millennium BCE.

Agriculture in China seems to have begun at the same time as pottery production and sedentary life, a distinction from several other regions. Most evidences, including both genetic and zooarchaeological data, indicate that cattle husbandry was introduced to China only during the late Neolithic, around 3600 to 2000 BCE. The earliest examples of cattle come from the regions of Gansu and Qinghai.

Neolithic cultures in the region may be divided into two large complexes, the Northwest (or Northcentral) and the East Coast. Cultures in these two complexes interacted with one another, and together they influenced the formation of Shang culture in the second millennium BCE.

The Peiligang (裴李岗) and Cishan (磁山; 6500 – 5000 BCE) cultures are regarded as the first established agricultural peoples in China. At this period, settlements were usually of modest sizes and characterized by rudimentary structures. Peiligang and Cishan pottery were usually simple bowls and jars with little surface refinement. The remains of these two cultures suggest the established status of sedentary life and the use of millet as the main cultivating crop. One of the most prominent Peiligang site is Jiahu, with an extraordinary area covering 5.5 ha. (Note: Jiahu and Peiligang are sometimes considered distinct cultures that share relations, rather than the former being a type-site of the latter. In fact, the earliest phase of the Jiahu settlement began 500 years earlier than Peiligang.) Despite Peiligang being a millet farming culture, excavations at Jiahu have yielded examples of rice, suggesting an alternative food strategy. Isolated graphs were also found at this site.

Contemporary cultures of Peiligang and Cishan include Dadiwan, Luoguantai, and Lijiacun or Baijia, which belonged to the Northwest. Agriculture of these cultures might have originated from northern Paleolithic hunter-gatherers. The Houli culture in Shandong (c. 6200 – 5500 BCE) shared similar characteristics, but traces of millet agriculture have yet to be found here.

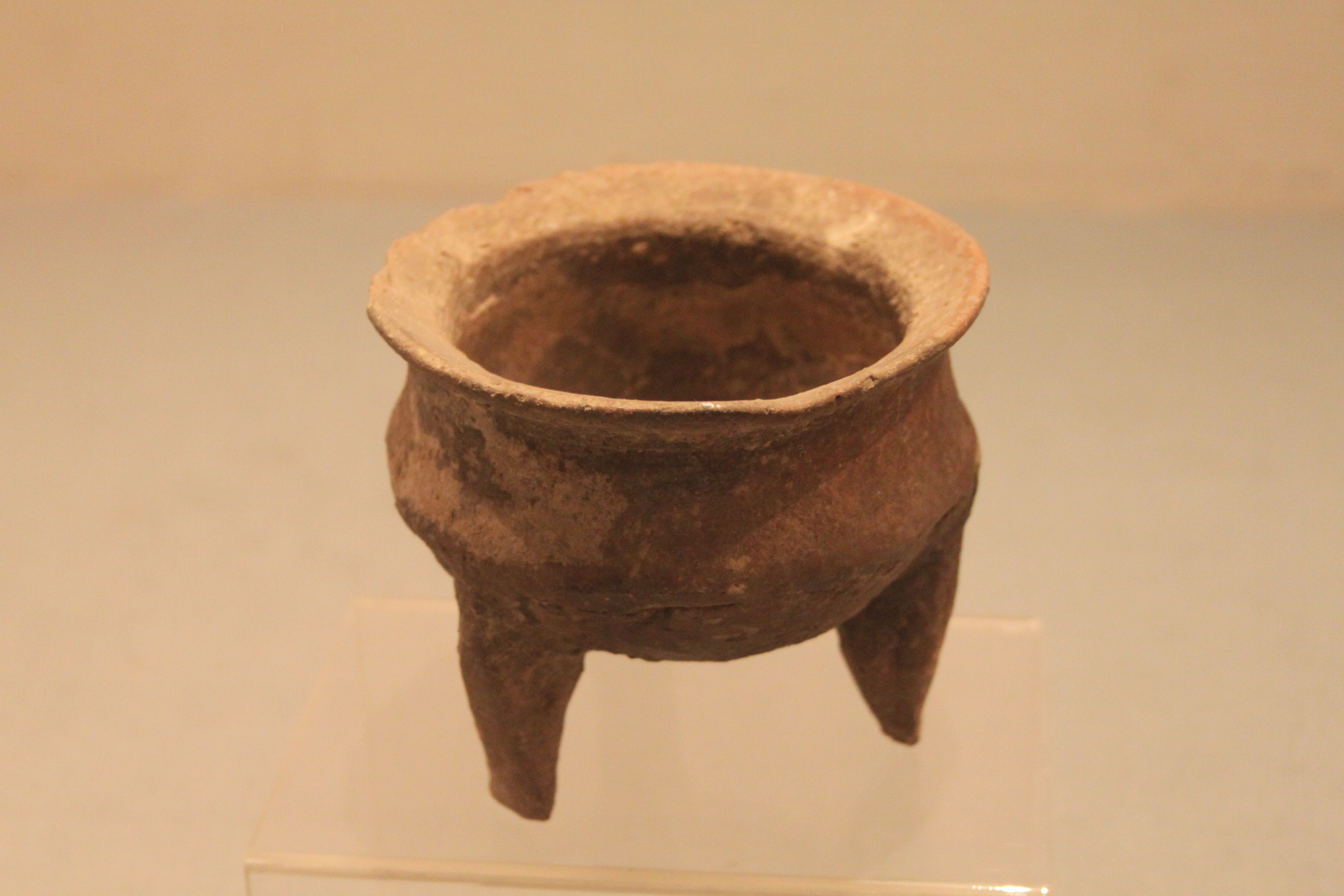
Three-legged ding from the Yangshao culture.

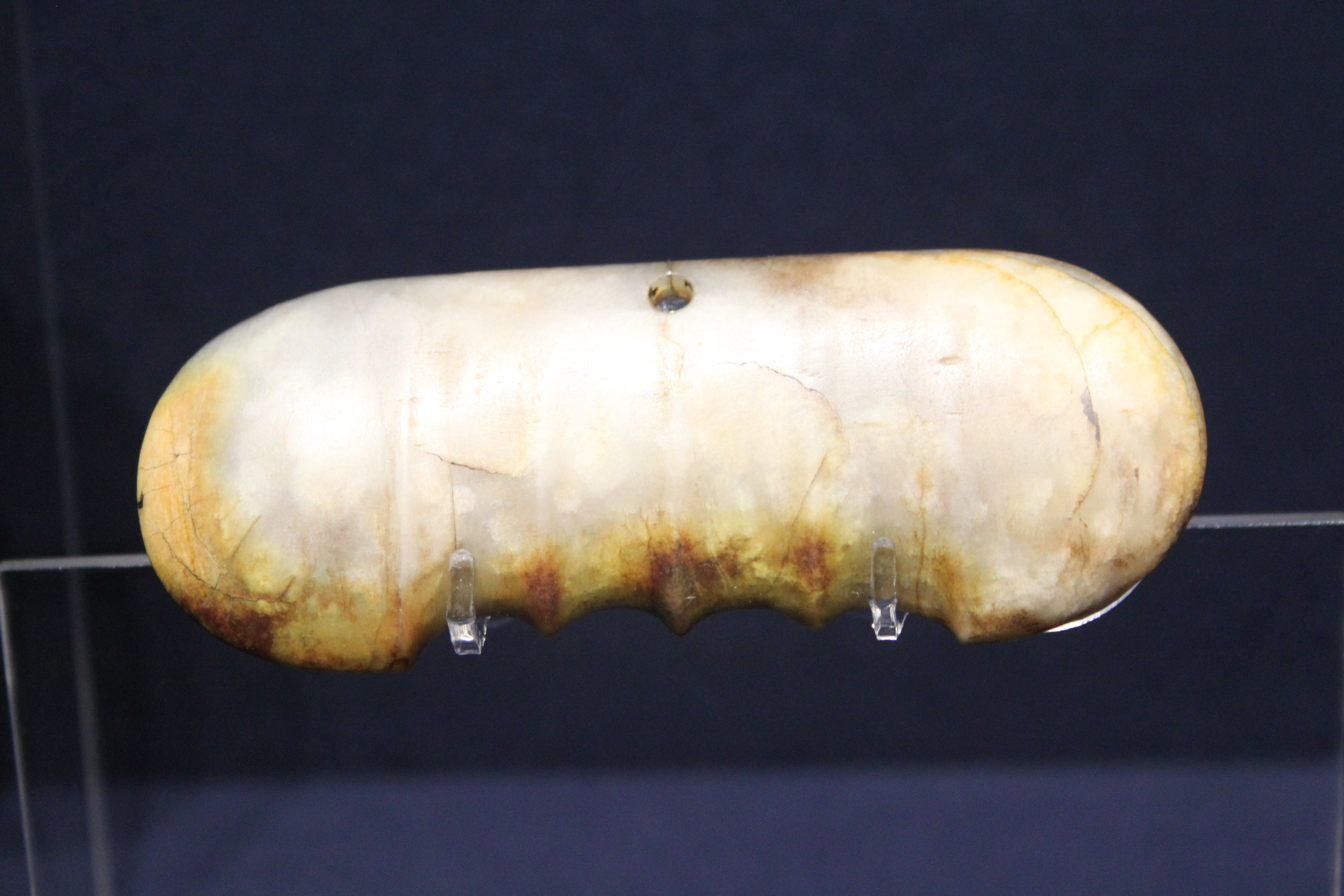
Jade pendant from the Hongshan culture

The Yangshao culture (5000 – 3000 BCE) has its type-sites located in Shaanxi, Shanxi and Henan. Yangshao sites until the 1990s numbered up to over 800, with each typically consisting of a residential area, a cemetery and kilns. These sites together with local types in the extended Yangshao area were divided into three phases. Some Yangshao societies, such as a village site named Jiangzhai, are considered matrilineal. Yangshao sites show signs of political-economic domination, and some academics have proposed that the culture its late phase more resembled a 'chiefdom' rather than a 'segmentary lineage system' as previously theorized.

East Coast cultures emerged together with Yangshao, albeit with distinct material culture. The Dawenkou culture arose in the Shandong region since 4300 BCE and lasted until the middle third millennium BCE. The early Dawenkou was an egalitarian tribal society with little evidence of prestige goods or burial differentiations. Social ranks appeared in this culture during its middle phase (c. 3500 – 2900 BCE), and by the late phase it had been characterized by hierarchically ordered social groups. Dawenkou maintained interactions with Yangshao, demonstrated by similarities among their ceramics.

Another contemporary culture named Hongshan flourished around the Liao River from 4000 to 2500 BCE. Hongshan settlements were partially allied with Yangshao, although walls and complex residences seen in the Yangshao sites are unknown in Hongshan settlements. The end of Yangshao coincides with the emergence of the Liangzhu culture in the Yangtze River valley approximately 5000 years ago. Liangzhu sites exhibit traits of an advanced society such as city walls, class stratification, labor division and extensive dam systems. The remarkable production and ritual use of jades were another two characterizing traits of Liangzhu peoples, with the number of jades reaching tens of thousands.

The middle Yangtze in South China was also inhabited by peoples of various cultures contemporary with those of the East Coast. Prominent examples include the Daxi (c. 5000 – 3000 BCE), Qujialing (c. 4000 – 3000 BCE), and Shijiahe. They featured their own characteristics but also combined cultural traits from both eastern and western regions, as indicated by their artifacts.

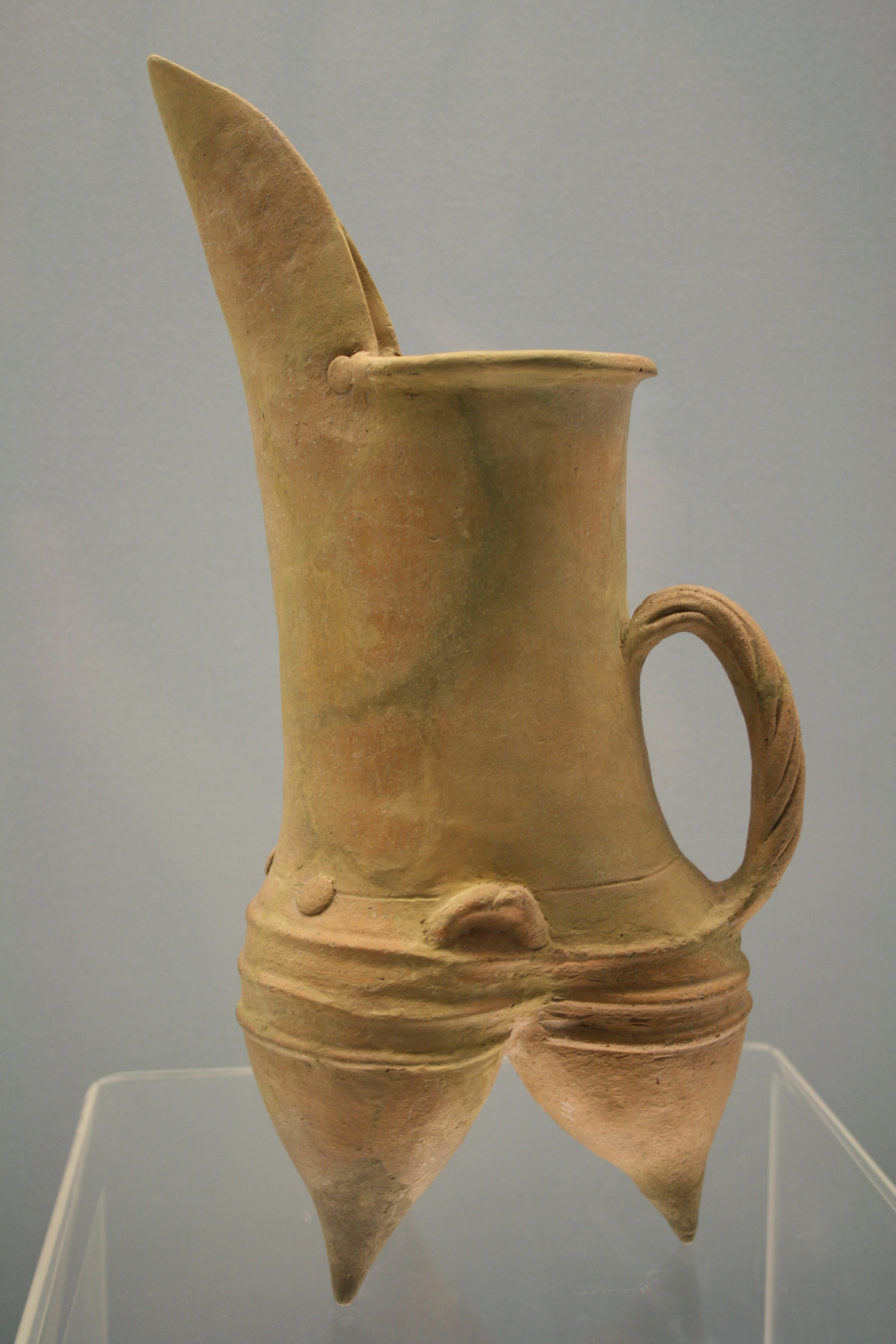
Longshan pottery jar

Further regional differentiation during the late Neolithic was highlighted by the Longshan culture which spanned over the entire third millennium BCE. Social integration was further intensified and hierarchies emerged in Longshan sites, together with rammed earth walls that define a more sophisticated social system than Yangshao. The largest Longshan site was found in modern Taosi (Shanxi province) which is characterized by extensive elite control and a solar observatory considered among the world's oldest. The Taosi observatory was possibly used by astronomers to produce a ritual calendar that may have been an ancestor of the late Shang religious calendrical system. As a Longshan type-site, Taosi was also an extremely stratified society, where only one tenth of its population might have controlled up to 90% of total wealth.

Far from Yangshao, Longshan and Liangzhu, Sichuan province was also a region of prominent Neolithic cultures. The late Neolithic Baodun culture flourished in the Chengdu plain before ending around 1700 BCE. Other significant sites in the Chengdu plain include Yingpanshan (c. 3300 – 2600 BCE) and Gaoshan (c. 2500 – 2000 BCE) which housed elaborate residential and utilitarian complexes.

=== Early Bronze Age cultures ===
The Chinese Bronze Age commenced around 2000 BCE. Bronze Age cultures inherited religious traditions of the Neolithic, with various identical practices ranging from iconography to burial patterns. The emergence of early states in the region correlated with the increasing prevalence of public religious activities.

The beginning of the second millennium BCE was marked by the rise of state formation in China with the emergence of the Erlitou culture, which descended from the previous Longshan culture and was heavily influenced by Longshan cultural characteristics. Erlitou opened a new period different from the previous Neolithic peoples in that it had a strong presence of royal authority, an enlarged political apparatus and extensive military powers. Lasting from c. 1900 – 1500 BCE, Erlitou can be described as the first proper Bronze Age state in China, with its sites featuring not only small bronze objects but also items of much larger size and higher technological complexity.

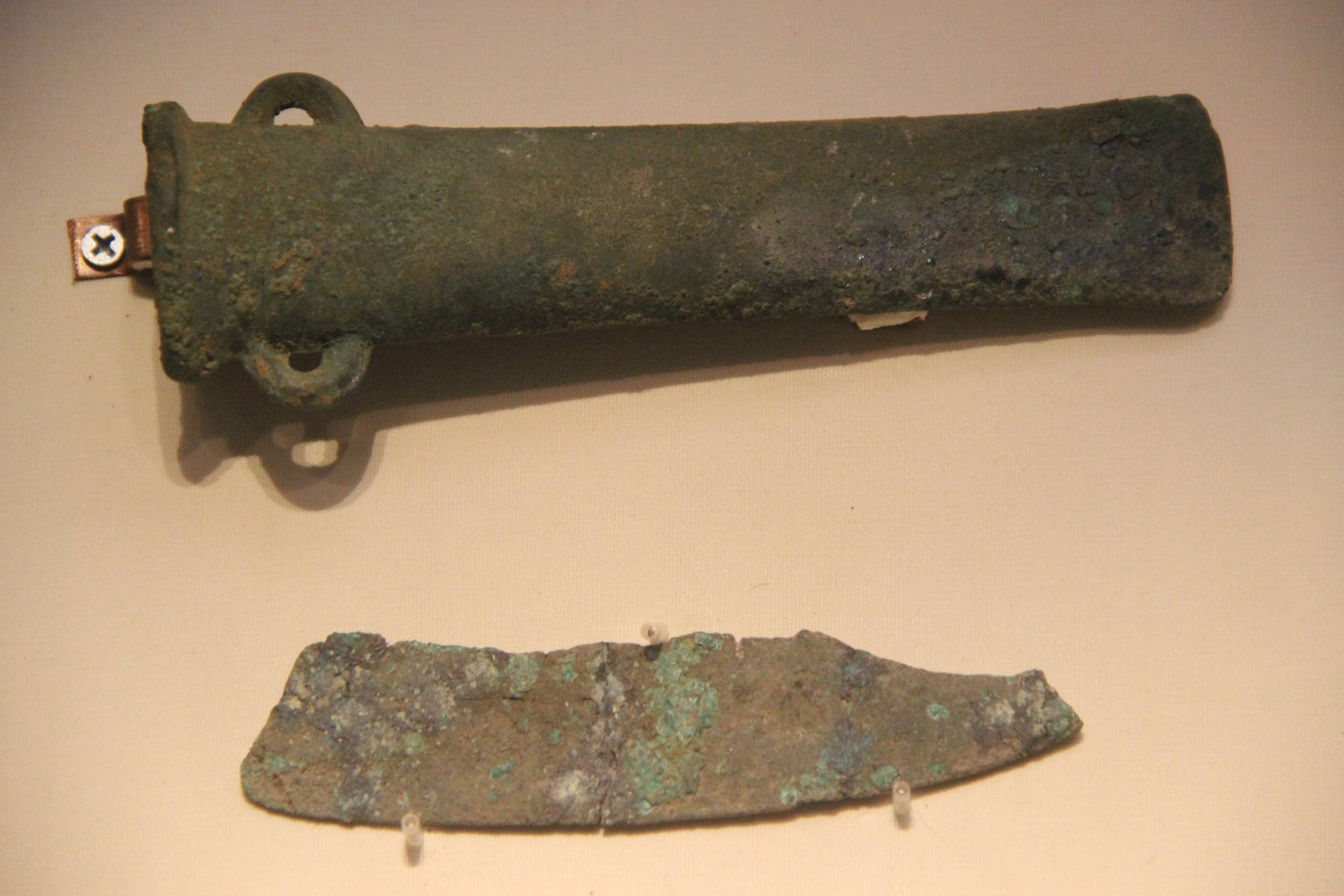
Bronze items from Qijia sites in Gansu province

Erlitou elites were able to exercise authority over source supply and transportation within a considerable area, in addition to their control over up to 30,000 urban residents. Most scholars in China and some among the Western academia consider Erlitou to be the material culture of the Xia, the first traditional dynasty of China that allegedly existed at the same time as Erlitou itself. No evidence, however, is enough to either confirm the identification or reject it.

To the west of Erlitou was the Qijia culture, whose excavation sites are located in the Loess Plateau, Hexi Corridor and even as far as eastern Qinghai-Tibet Plateau. It marked Northwest China's transition from late Neolithic to early and middle Bronze Age. All Qijia sites show signs of a sedentary lifestyle with a mix of agricultural and pastoral production. Their bronzes include daggers, axes, rings, and mirrors.

The Sanxingdui culture existed in Sichuan at roughly the same time as the Shang dynasty in the Central Plain. Hundreds of bronzes and jades have been excavated there, many of which suggest that Sanxingdui had a different cultural and religious system from the Shang.

== Beliefs ==
Modern understanding about prehistoric Chinese religions is hindered by a lack of contemporary writing; therefore, it has mostly been acquired through archaeological works at culture sites as well as inference from the already-documented Shang state religion. Elizabeth Childs-Johnson contends that belief systems of ancient cultures are best understood by examining their artworks, and that metamorphism was a central aspect of religions in China since at least the late Neolithic.

=== Cosmology ===
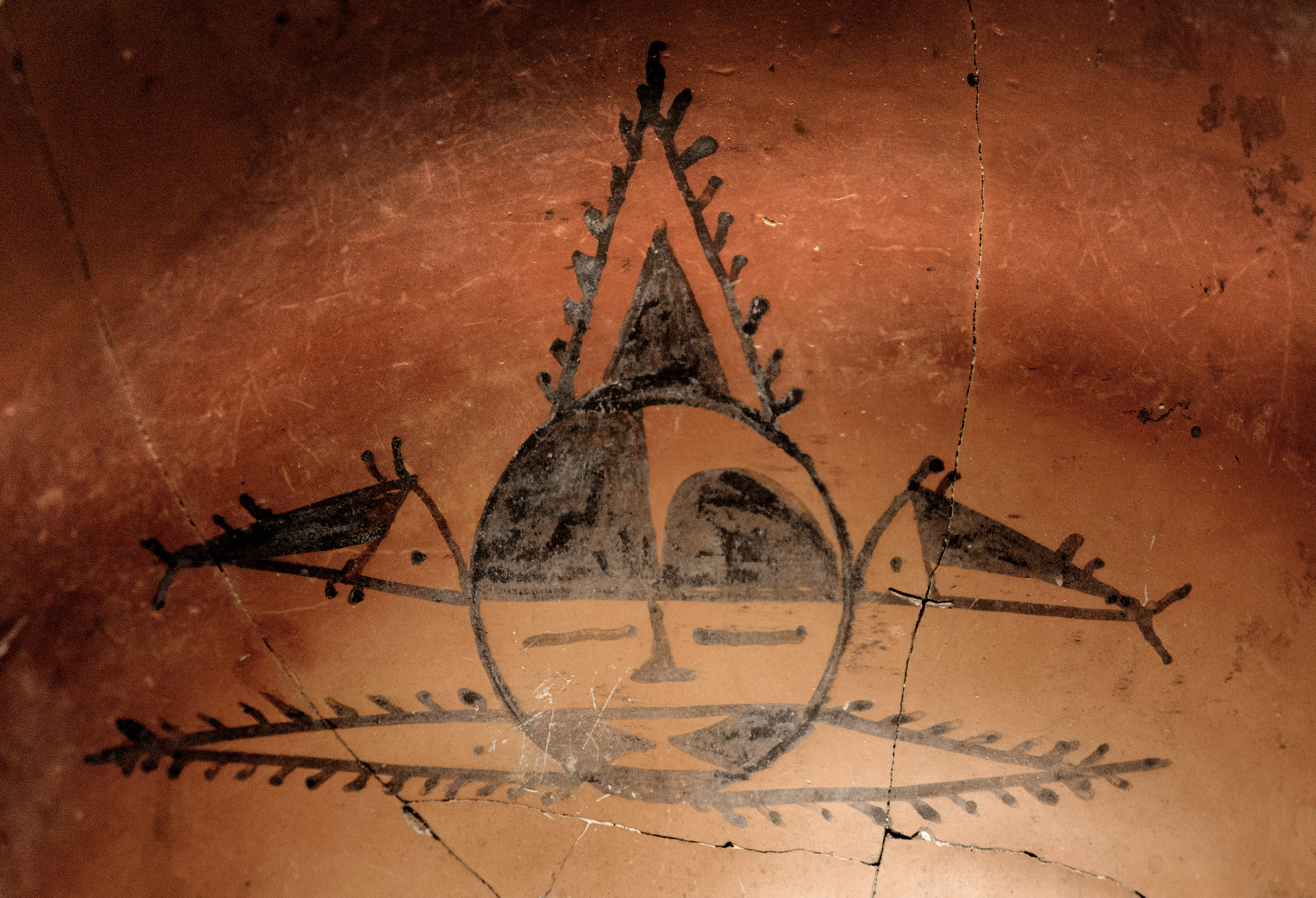
The mixed human and fish face of a Banpo face, which bears religious beliefs

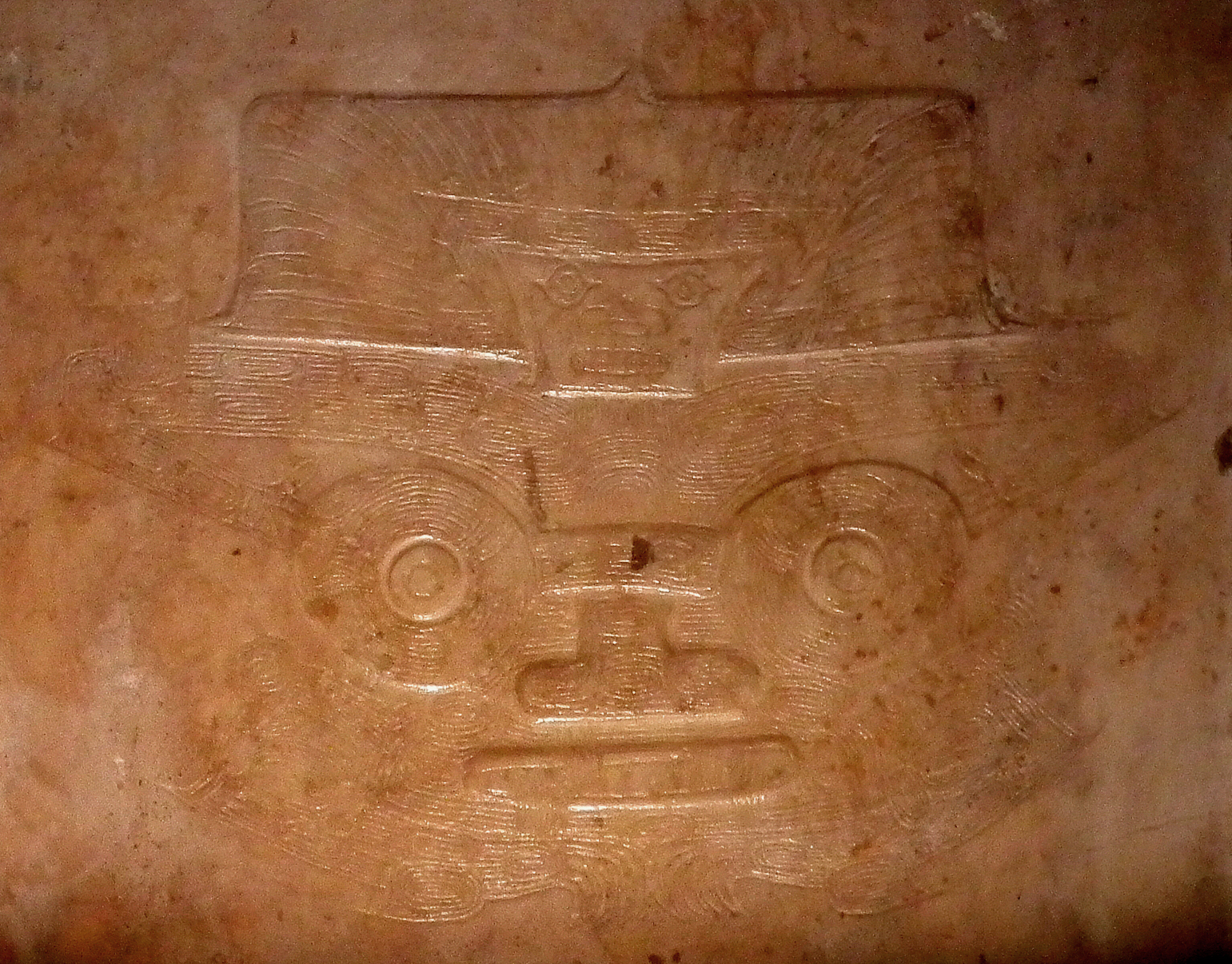
The anthropo-zoomorphic (AZ) motif on Liangzhu jade cong. This motif regularly appears on many jade objects.

Scholars have interpreted antique jades as representations of cosmological objects, such as wind, clouds, Earth, and Heaven. For example, some jades disks are perceived as symbols of Heaven, its dome, and nature's cycle.

The Neolithic Chinese during the fifth and fourth millennia BCE already incorporated in their faith the image of the northern celestial pole as a symbol of divinity. The region they concerned was formed by stars Alioth, Pherkad, Thuban, Mizar, and Kochab. This area was, in their perceptions, a source of protection for the dead by communion with high stellar powers. David Pankenier theorizes, although speculatively, that the later Chinese imperial tradition which associates the polar star Thuban with divinity had emerged as early as 3000 BCE.

One particular Yangshao type-site is Banpo, which lasted from 5000 to 3500 BCE. Found at Banpo, as well as Jiangzhai and several other Yangshao sites, are ceramic bowls decorated by a face created by mixing human faces and fish together. This pattern likely represented certain religious beliefs of the Banpo people and may even reflect a metaphorical meaning.

Some theorize that the face could be an early symbol of the solar power in which the villagers believed. John C. Didier projects the face pattern to the sky area around the northern pole and finds that it aligned with stellar patterns surrounding the pole during the period of Yangshao. Didier takes this as evidence that Banpo villagers held beliefs in the celestial area and might have attributed myths to them. The rectangular shape at the center of the face could be identified with the mouth of a deity to whom Banpo people offered goods, and the fish imagery might also be gods as well. Banpo art also features a horned ungulate head, whose celestial derivation is likely the same as that of the face. As ungulates constituted an important source of food and clothing, this association implies a belief that this beneficence was provided by the celestial god.

Niuheliang ritual structures reflected Hongshan astronomical perception. One of its central platforms might be an imitation of the Banpo face, implying Hongshan beliefs in the celestial pole. This belief was likely transmitted to the Liangzhu which likely maintained contact with other cultures. Liangzhu artifacts also featured a motif, academically referred to as the shoumian. Alternatively called the "anthropo-zoomorphic" (AZ) motif, this pattern probably represented ancestral gods or at least Neolithic cult recipients, and may be an ancestor of the later Shang taotie pattern. (Note: Some academics even consider this motif to be a representation of the Liangzhu High God.) A seven-point pattern found in Qijia sites is related to Liangzhu and might trace its origins to as far as Bactria. Other late Neolithic cultures in the eastern region developed similar motifs which prevailed until the Western Zhou period.

=== Deities ===
At some point, probably still in the Neolithic, the commemoration of the dead – a feature common to many early cultures, including the Greek and Mesopotamian – probably became more orderly and articulated in China, taking on an ideological and juridical power of its own.

— David Keightley
Hongshan pig-dragon jade pendants
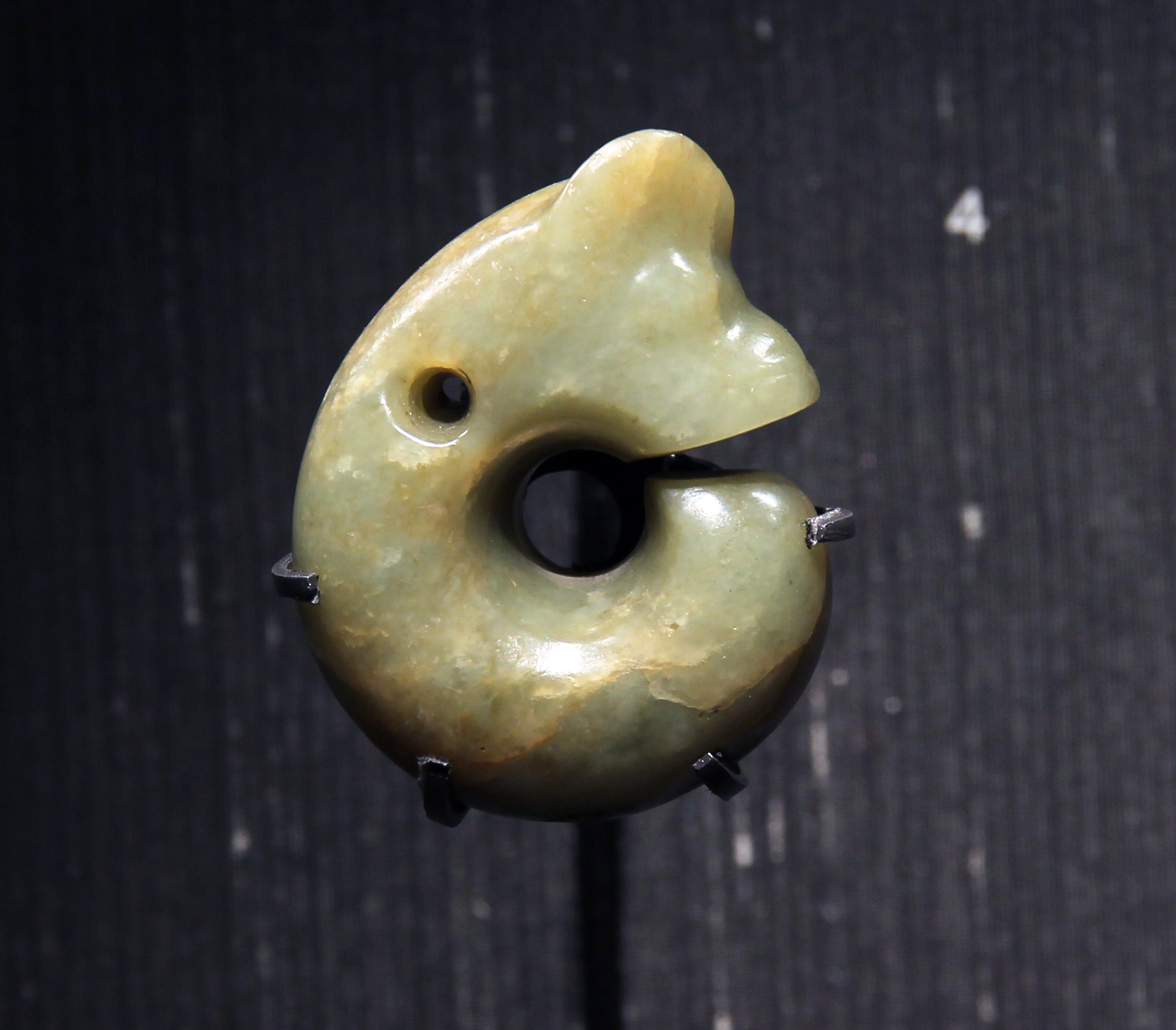
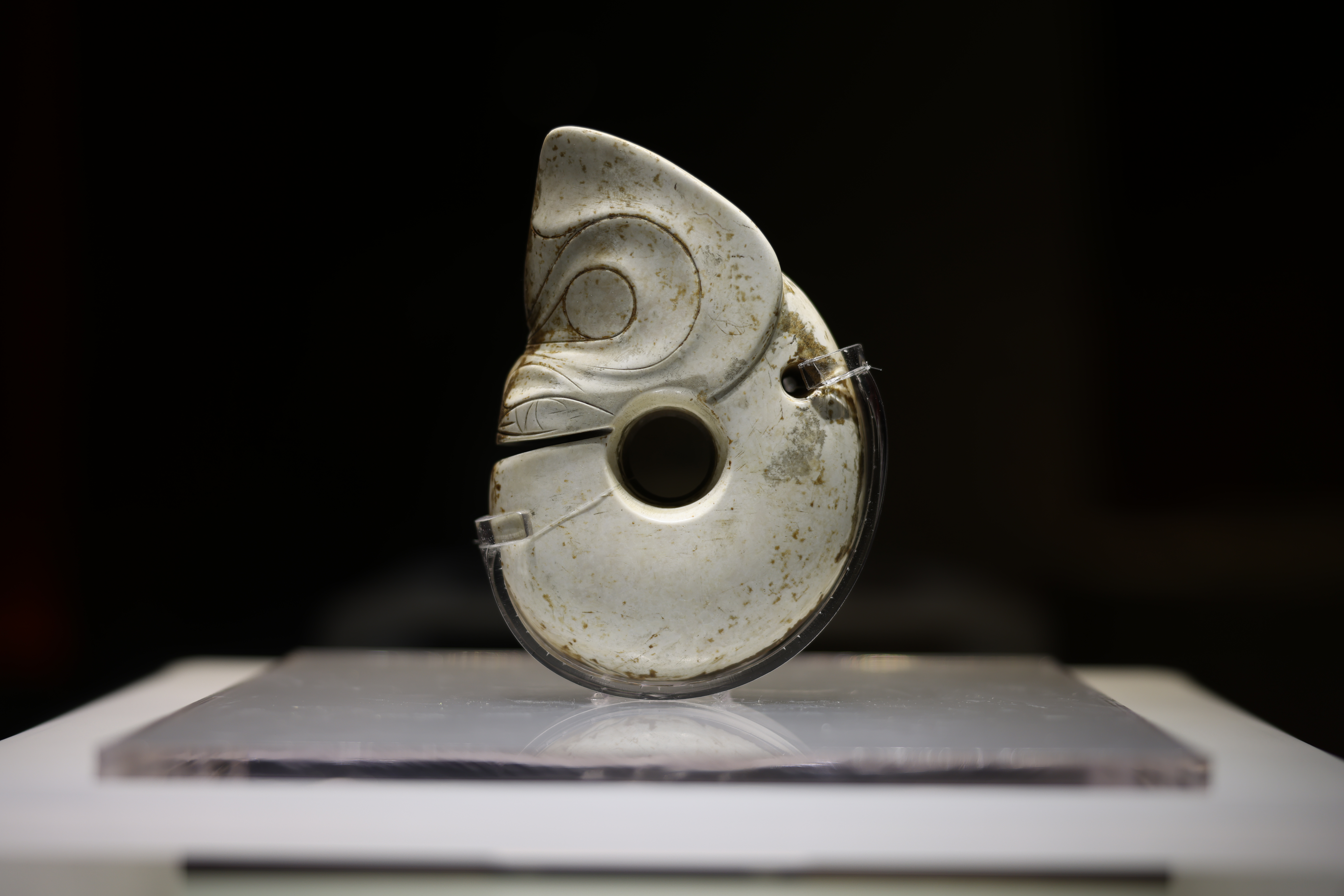

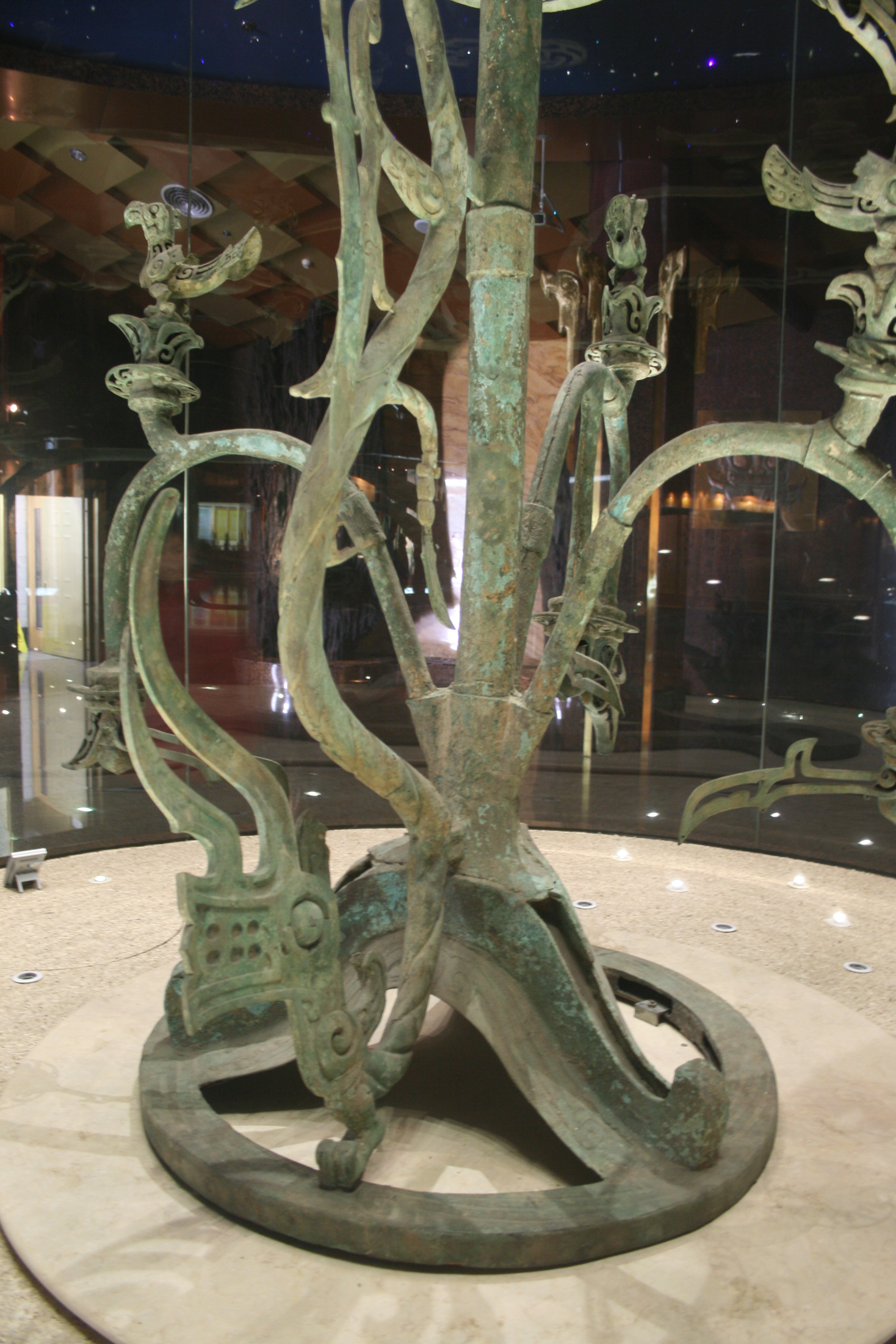
Bronze tree of Sanxingdui which symbolizes religious meanings

Objects of divinity were already present during the Xinglongwa culture which is known for jade manufacturing. Shaped like farming tools, these items indicate a belief in powerful spirits who controlled both nature and the human realm. A certain Xinglongwa statue has been interpreted as either a fire or fertility goddess.

Evidence for ancestor worship dates back to the Yangshao period, although it may have begun as early as the Xinglongwa era. This belief brought to the Neolithic peoples a sense of order and peace. The dead were given enormous precedence in what Kwang-chih Chang called the "cult of the ancestors", and were worshipped according to kinship groupings. During the second half of the third millennium BCE, the ancestor cult shifted towards individual worship as social stratification intensified. (Note: Phallic symbols dating back to the Neolithic may be an indicator of ancestral worship. Many elements of this persist until the present day.) Ancestral deification was likely related to fertility cults of the same era, and probably influenced the later Chinese concept of filial piety.

Some scholars deduce, without written evidence, that figurines of the Niuheliang site symbolized the Hongshan "Mother Goddess" and her entourage. It is also posited that the goddess might be identified with a certain "earth mother", whom Hongshan people treated as a fertility deity and who was possibly related to descriptions in later Chinese literature. The belief in such goddess was associated with ancestor worship in which the fertility deity herself was a mythified ancestress. A fertility cult may also have been established at Qujialing culture sites such as Dengjiawan and Liujiawan, as Chinese archaeologists have suggested based on phallic artifacts found at the site. However, insubstantial evidence render this theory unverified.

The dragon seemed to be a very significant mythical animal to Neolithic Chinese cultures, which had it as a major iconography emblem. The creature, which might be an exaggeration of the snake, was strongly associated with water and the transcendent realm. A combination of numerous animals like fish, serpents, birds and deer, the Neolithic dragon exhibit extraordinary power to move between what was above and below.

The Hongshan jade pig-dragon signified the goddess' dragon assistant integrated with the pig image, likely as a result of the Hongshan culture being dependent on agricultural and domestic fortune which the pig symbolized. This dragon was likely transmitted from Hongshan to later cultures such as Longshan and Erlitou, and finally to the Shang dynasty; the Shang themselves produced varieties of the same dragon found at Hongshan, and their writing script even had two characters resembling dragons. Aside from the aforementioned cultures, the dragon design was also found at Shijiahe and Yangshao sites.

Located to the south of Hongshan settlements, the Liangzhu culture maintained a strong religious presence and is sometimes described as a theocracy. Some consider the Liangzhu shoumian to depict a half-human, half animal supreme being that was a blend of ancestral worship and totemism. The Liangzhu likely worshipped the sun integrated with a divine bird, a practice similar to the Hemudu culture (5500 – 3300 BCE) which also worshipped both the two.

Not enough evidence is available to conclude whether the religion of the Sanxingdui culture was monotheistic or polytheistic, and whether this religion included attempts to control nature. No clear godly symbols were found there, but its people likely worshipped an all-knowing deity together with mountain and solar spirits. Archaeologists have unearthed at Sanxingdui several bronze trees decorated by birds. The meaning of these trees may be interpreted in several ways, including an intermediary between the natural and the sacred, or possibly a link between the Sun, the animal realm and fertility. Ancestral deities may also have been a feature of the Sanxingdui belief system.

=== Totemism and animal symbolism ===
Totemic beliefs likely made their appearance in Chinese history at the same time when various different traditions began to culminate in a more unified culture in the Central Plain. There exist emblems found in the East Coast featuring bird headdresses which were likely related to some form of bird totemism and bird worship. Symbols of the same animal found at Sanxingdui might imply that birds were believed to be guardians, or even elements of a miraculous realm outside of the human world.

Yangshao-era depictions of snakes have led some academics to identify them with Fuxi, a legendary ancestor depicted with a snake body. The Taosi site yields a bowl bearing an ear snake image, likely a water-associated religious symbol embodying reptile worship. Also related to water were frog symbols, which feature prominently at Yangshao sites such as Miaodigou and Banpo, and which might signify good fortune and the image of the full moon. Some representations of fighting dogs during the late Yangshao period suggest a context of the afterlife, and might reflect a belief that these battling dogs symbolized guardians of two different worlds struggling to protect a lost human soul. Dog images also appear in artifacts from cultures such as the Hemudu and Dawenkou.

=== Life and death ===
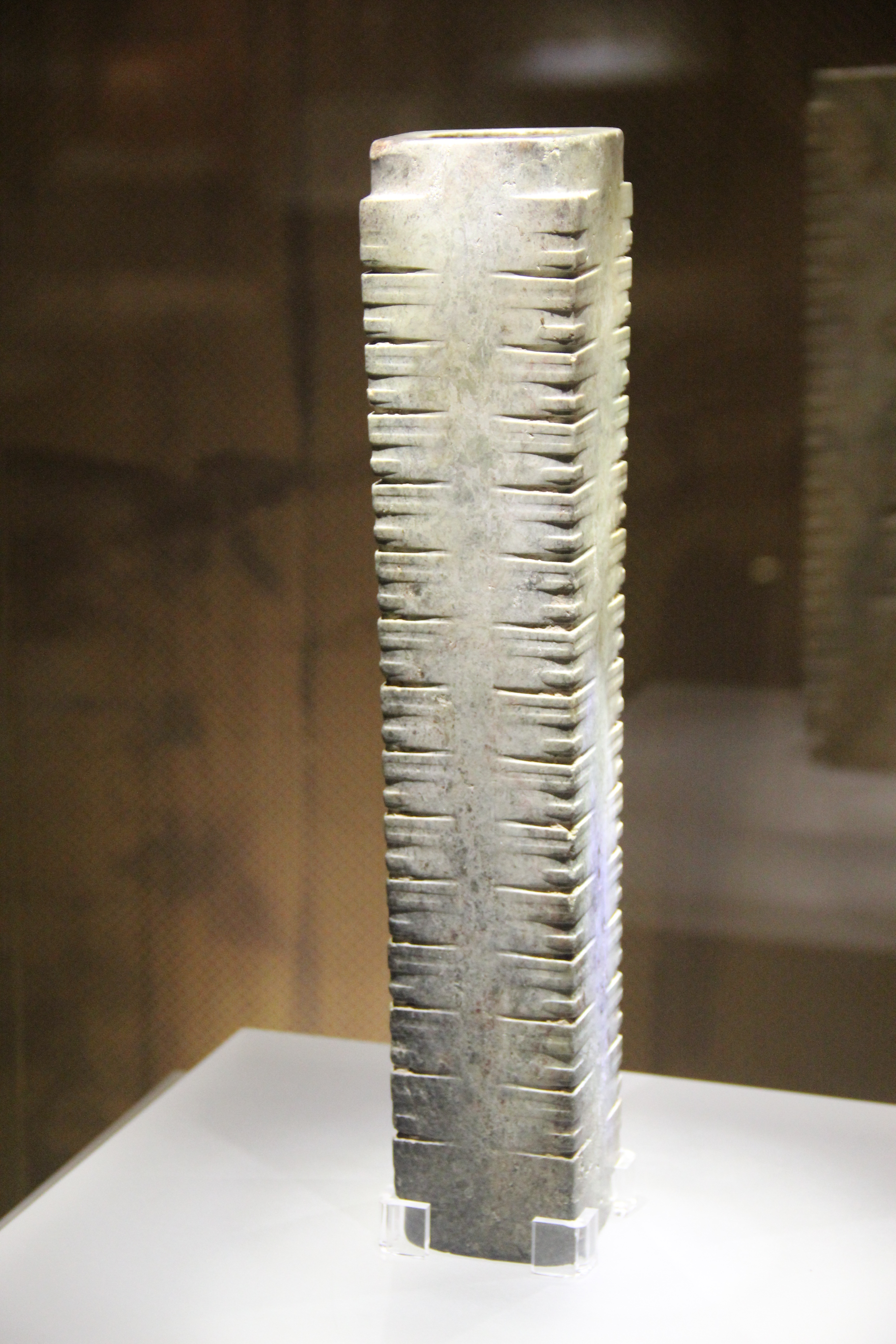
Jade cong in Neolithic China

The belief in the afterlife had been upheld by people in China as early as the Upper Paleolithic (c. 16000 BCE). This belief also appeared during the Neolithic, probably characterized by an underworld guarded by the jade-represented dragons with powerful flexibility from evil spirits.

Some scholars posit that the Banpo face motif might have mimicked the face of a divine power who would be pleased and willing to protect the dead children in death. Also, to the Neolithic Chinese, life and death were interconnected with the celestial polar region which, aside from providing post-mortem security, served to assure the living of a continued existence after death. Life and death were also associated with jade-depicted cicadas and silkworms, whose metamorphosis was considered similar to the process of death's physical transformation and transition to a new life. This belief likely resulted from understandings of insect lifecycles prevalent in silk-textile producing cultures around 3500 BCE.

== Ritual facilitation ==
=== Religious constructions ===
At Niuheliang lay the Hongshan Mother Goddess temple, dated to c. 3630 BCE. This temple appears non-Chinese in nature, being symmetrical and having strict component distinctions housed with a surface resembling the Chinese character 亞 (ya). Its excavated parts include a subterranean room with walls likely decorated by murals, along with a Goddess altar. Surrounding the temple was a mud-supported wooden wall that likely experienced burnings, and which was filled with ceramics.

Niuheliang altars were separated from residential areas and built by centrally directed labor. An example among them was a stone platform next to another concentric circular one, on the center of which was a rectangular altar enclosed within a square structure; all the concentric shapes formed an altar of worship. Didier claims the likelihood of this altar serving heaven, although it might have also served the earth. (Note: Didier also postulated that this altar once served Niuheliang settlers the same way as Stonehenge to contemporary Britons.) Two open altars feature prominently at the Hongshan Dongshanzui site. Both were built out of yellow earth layers framed by colored granites, together with fertility figurines for ritual purposes. Concentric circle designs have also been identified at this site. These altars likely supported worship of nature rather than ancestors.

Pre-Hongshan cultures such as the Xinglongwa likely dug ditches and trenches in their community for ritual use, since the nature of such excavated structures was not suitable for any other purpose. The way these were built might be related to the belief in life and death. However, the post-Hongshan landscape in Liaoning no longer featured religious constructions.

Found in two Liangzhu sites of Fanshan and Yaoshan, Zhejiang, were elevated rectangular grounds, at the center of which lay square altars with side measuring 20 meters. This design not only confirms Liangzhu contact with other Neolithic cultures, but also indicates a strong belief in astronomy and the celestial square. Remains of a sacrificial mound about 2000 m^{2} in area have been identified among facilities in a Longshan site in Anhui. The structure was a long earthen area with jagged edges, with features such as a ridge, several postholes, an elongated series of posthole pits, and burned surfaces. Particularly, a square earthen stage was situated at the center of the mound. These all existed alongside Imperial tombs.

During the late Neolithic there were virtually no constructions specifically dedicated to religion, while the early Bronze Age witnessed the construction of temple-palace complexes at Erlitou. Located at the center of the Erlitou site lay its 7.5-ha temple complex, which accompanied palaces and stood on rammed-earth foundations. Excavated at Qijia sites are six stone circles used for certain religious activities, lying next to burials and containing bone fragments. Analysis of Sanxingdui along with an ancient site beneath modern Chengdu reveals that one was dedicated to economics and another to rituals. Mountain symbols from these sites have been interpreted as 'flat altars inside a tent-like structure', and their designs were probably influenced by celestial motions.

=== Ritual paraphernalia ===
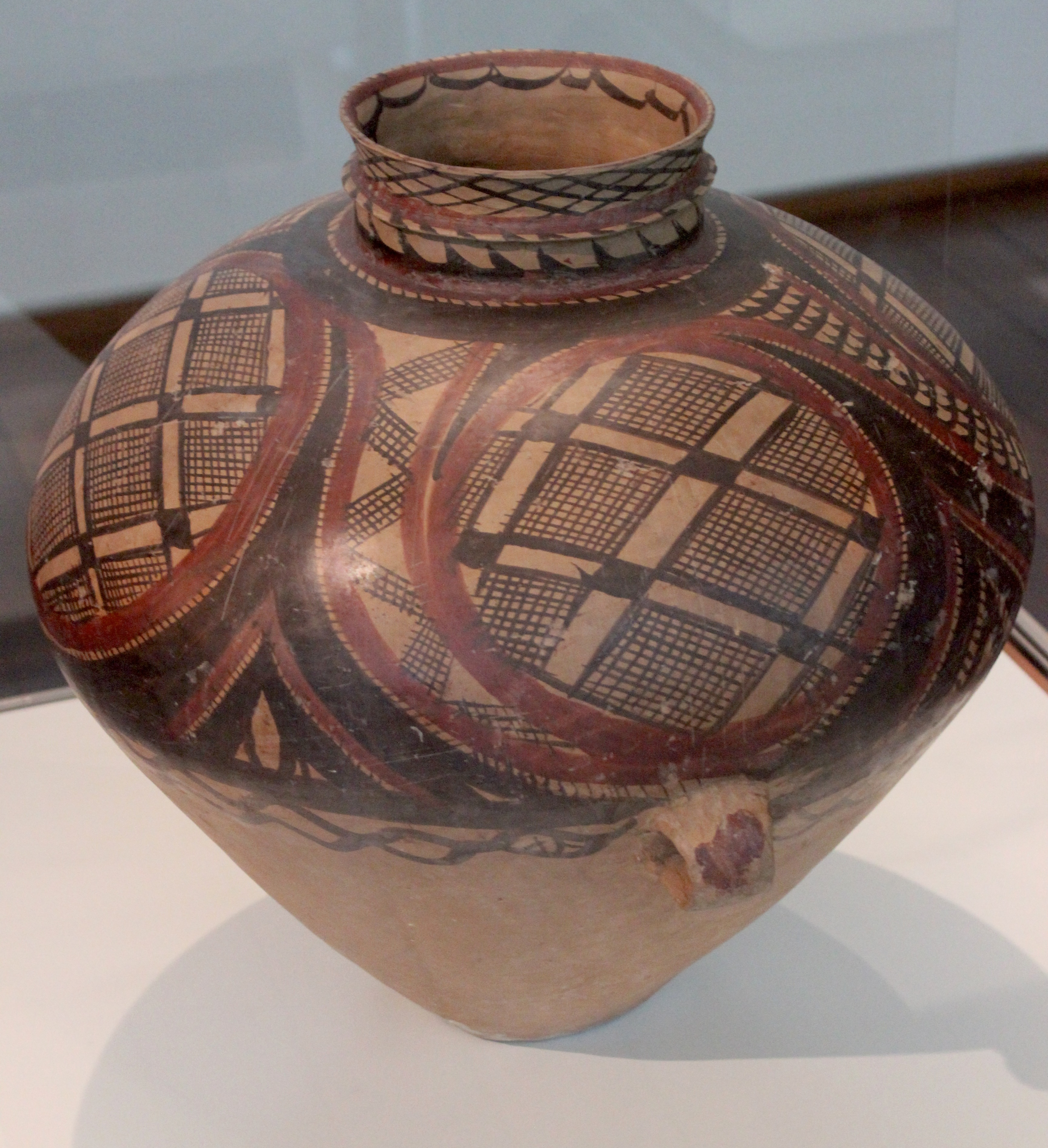
Pottery jar from the Majiayao culture

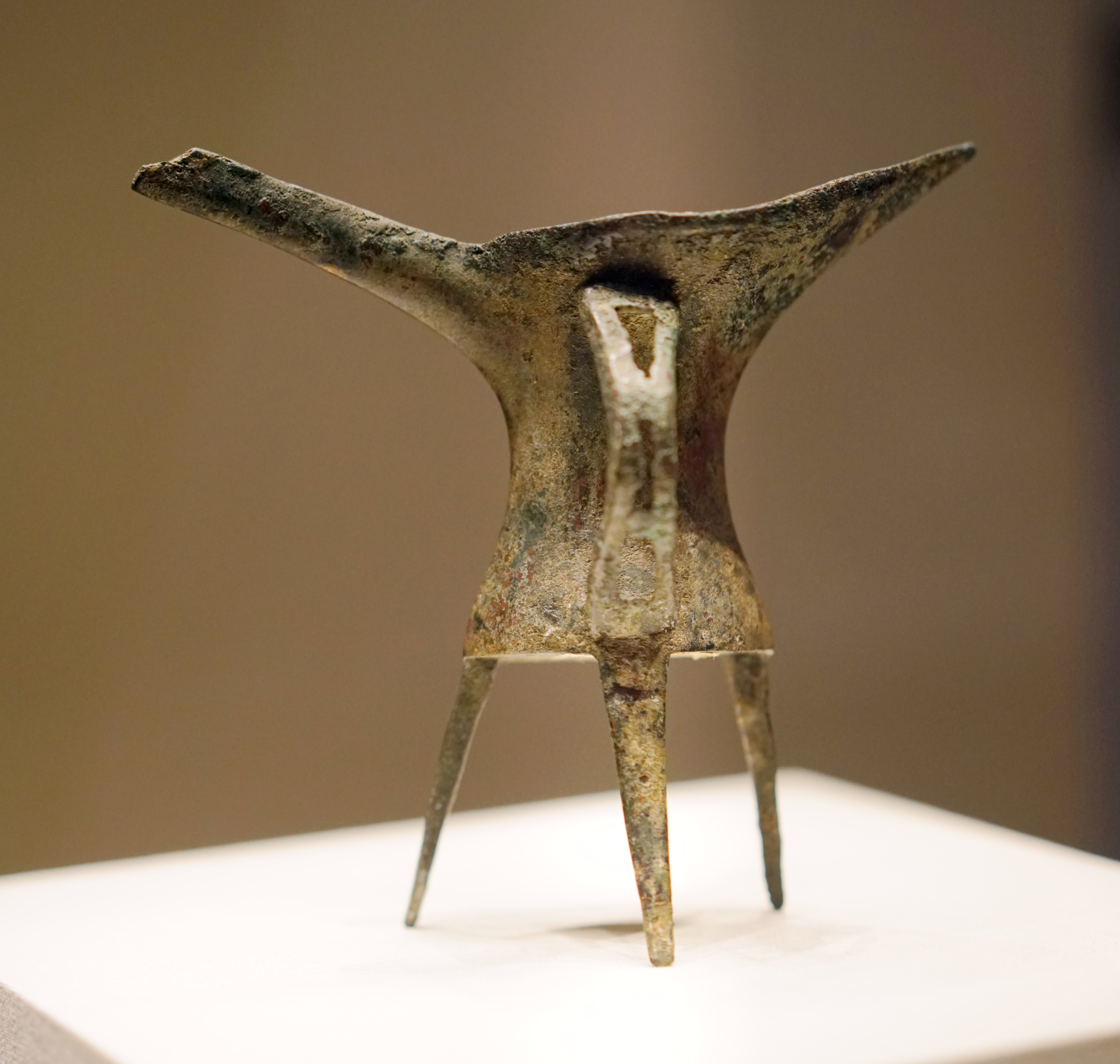
Bronze jue goblet from the Erlitou site in Henan

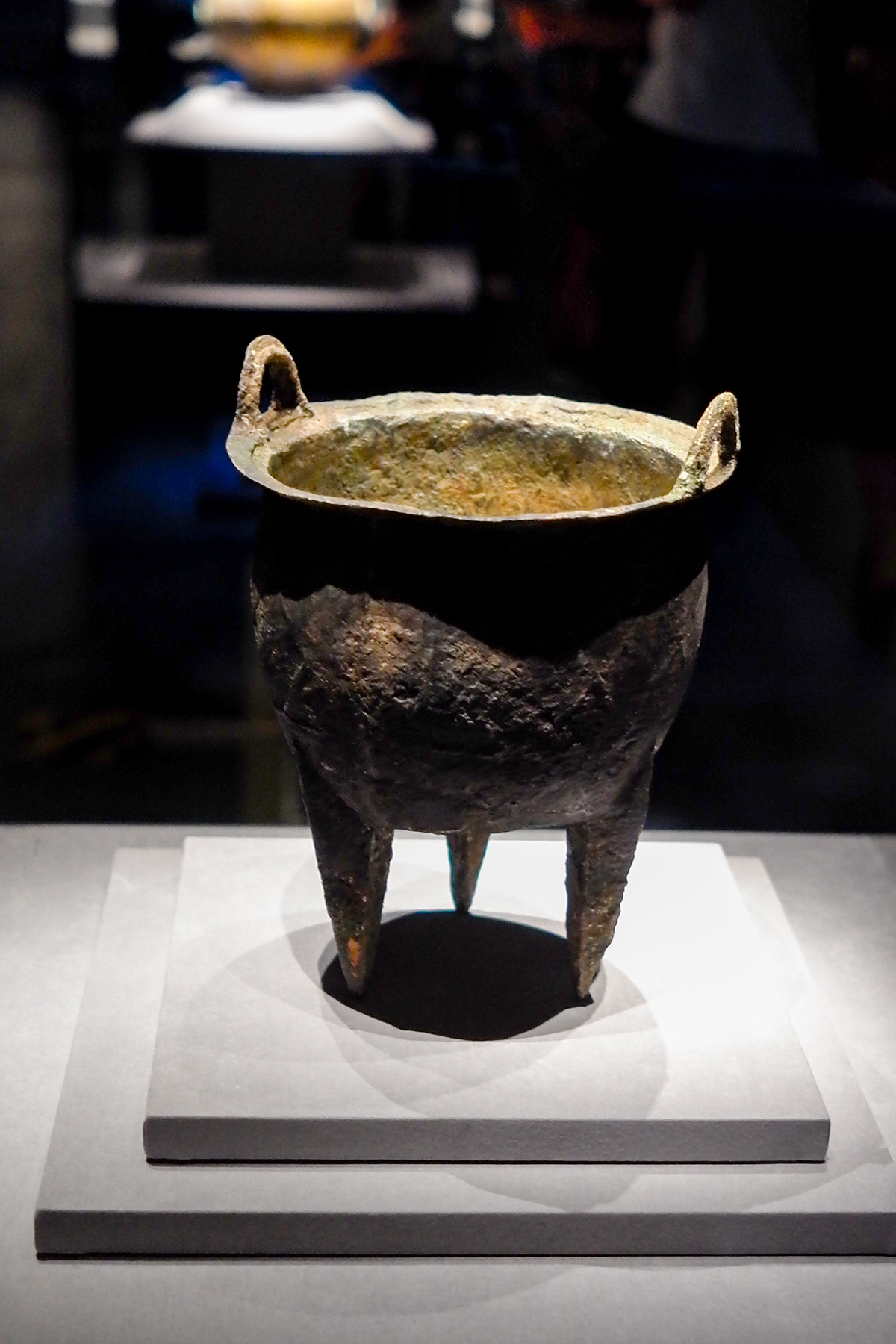
Early bronze ding of the Erlitou culture

Academics refer to prehistoric Chinese ritual objects as 'ritual paraphernalia' (禮器; lǐqì). These objects were often painted with zoomorphic and even ornithomorphic images, and were produced with great workmanship and intensive labor – suggesting their use by the political elites. Despite minimal knowledge about their purposes, it is understood that these objects were utilized for ancestor worship.

Jades embodied spiritual meanings to the prehistoric Chinese. They were used in a wide variety of Neolithic cultures including Xinglongwa, Hongshan, Majiabang (5000 – 3200 BCE), Shijiahe (2600 – 2000 BCE), Liangzhu, Longshan, and Qijia. Three particular jade objects were used by multiple cultures spanning various regions, consisting of cong tubes, bi disks, and yazhang tablets; cong and bi were employed in spiritual communications. Jade characteristics varied with culture; for example, Dawenkou jades are represented with ornamental and refined tools, while those of Longshan usually include blades. Longshan and Liangzhu jades are precursors of the later Erlitou artifacts made from the same material. In turn, Erlitou jades inspired Sanxingdui artifacts such as the ge ritual axes.

Yangshao pottery spread to the Majiayao culture and even further into Xinjiang and Central Asia; Majiayao designs are decorated by a variety of patterns including the swastika. (Note: Zhang Qizhi considers Majiayao to be a variant of Yangshao and calls it accordingly the Gansu Yangshao culture. Majiayao painted pottery products account for the majority of all works across China.) Pottery examples from the Shandong Longshan culture were molded into rectilinear shapes of extreme thinness and polished black surfaces. The Chinese sinologist Li Chi and fellow proponents traced the origins of ritual bronze designs in China to Neolithic pottery, although more recent excavations has rendered their argument unsubstantiated. Erlitou pottery were derived from that of Dawenkou and Longshan.

The Longshan people utilized ritual alligator drums, which symbolized high social status and functioned during ceremonies. (Note: The Shang civilization seemed to have imitated drum alligators, and such objects have been found in Shang royal tombs. Some conflate these drums with the tuógǔ (鼉鼓) mentioned in ancient Chinese texts.) Besides, clay drums were also found at the Dawenkou as well as regions in Gansu. These drums might have formed a tradition that persisted to the time of Marquis Yi of Zeng (c. 433 BCE).

Bronzes came into use as a type of primary ritual objects around 1700 BCE. The first Chinese ritual bronzes came from the Erlitou, consisting of ten small jue goblets, nine of which appear to have no decorations and the other bearing simple art. Other Erlitou ritual bronzes include the jia, the he, and the famous ding. The latter, which are tripods, traced their origins back to early Neolithic versions made by the Peiligang and Yangshao. A typical pottery ding from the fourth millennium BCE had its flat legs positioned radially and leg edges either pinched or serrated, and the early bronze ding was probably inspired by this design.

Examples of ritual bronzes at Sanxingdui are bird-man statues, bronze altars adorned by majestic birds, bronze heads, and bronze trees. Sanxingdui also produced bronze collared discs decorated with birds, which probably was used by priests in rituals.

=== Participants ===
Ritual specialists already appeared in prehistoric times. Archaeologist Su Bingqi posited, taking ritual constructions of the Hongshan and Yangshao cultures as evidence, that a religious transition had occurred during the fourth millennium BCE, resulting in a group of religious professionals by 3500 BCE.

In the Sanxingdui culture, such priests were specifically trained and formally recognized, and their expertise might range from magicians and sorcerers to spirit intermediaries. Sanxingdui religious wardens were different from diviners of the Shang dynasty in that while the latter communicated with the spirits via turtle plastrons, the former were entrusted to assume the persona of spirits during ceremonies. These people were represented by bronze works, such as life-sized heads sometimes decorated by gold masks or small depictions of ritual practitioners. Some works symbolize them conducting rituals to mountains.

Rituals likely involved female contributions. In particular, female participation in Sanxingdui ritual was possibly more significant than what current evidence suggests, albeit different in nature from that of men. Similar to Sanxingdui, women of the Hongshan culture might have assumed priesthood and managed activities in their temple complex. These individuals might be granted the right to adorn themselves with pig pendants.

Pottery vessels were often buried outside the deceased's wooden chambers, suggesting their use for food or drink by a large number of mourners attending funerals of exalted individuals. Scholarship on early rituals in China focused on private rituals, such as oracle bone divination and prestige funerals, which the elites utilized as a means of securing power. However, in the region there also existed public rituals which were held in open areas and often with mass participation of commoners.

== Practices ==
=== Oracle bone divination ===
The form of early Chinese divination was pyro-osteomancy (or pyromancy), which involves burning animal bones. Oracle bone divination with scapulae and turtle shells was a source of state power for the late Shang dynasty (c. 1250 – 1046 BCE). Pyromancy began to take root in North China around the latter half of the fourth millennium BCE. Some assumed that Neolithic pyromancy was linked to the cult for the dead which was then developing. The practice might have resulted from coincidence, with the Neolithic Chinese noticing bone cracks during sacrificial rituals and interpreting them as divine responses. Pyromancy persisted over a long period of time and was linked to politically sanctioned ritual specialists. It is also likely that aside from pyromancy, peoples in Neolithic China also practiced divination with materials that are now inaccessible.

Radiocarbon dates of Neolithic Chinese oracle bones
Site / culture	Uncalibrated date (BP)	Calibrated date (BCE)	Laboratory designation
Fuhegoumen	4600 ± 110	3321 ± 179	
Kangjia	4115 ± 75	2709 ± 120	BK-91040
Kangjia	4130 ± 80	2716 ± 119	BK-91039
Yangbai	3750 ± 70	2172 ± 109	ZK-2255
Yangbai	3530 ± 70	1867 ± 91	ZK-2256
Dahezhuang	3570 ± 95	1924 ± 131	ZK-15
Dahezhuang	3540 ± 95	1887 ± 123	ZK-23
Early Erlitou phase I	3457 ± 30	1799 ± 59	ZK-5261
Late Erlitou phase IV	3270 ± 32	1556 ± 43	ZK-5242a

The aforementioned materials had already been in use during the early Neolithic period for divinatory purposes, but turtle shells appeared to be rarer than ox scapulae or sheep bones. Divination with turtle shells can be found in cultures such as Peiligang and was prevalent among cultures of the eastern Chinese coast and along the Yangtze River, such as Daxi, Dawenkou and Majiabang. (Note: K. C. Chang argued that many Shang practices was derived from Dawenkou traditions.)

An early example of pyromancy in China was a scapula of a sheep or deer, excavated in either Inner Mongolia or Liaoning province. Radiocarbon-dated to 3321 ± 179 BCE, the bone exhibits burn marks deliberately inflicted upon its distal blade. It constitutes a collection of Late Neolithic divination examples coming from North China, which also includes the sites Jungar Banner (Inner Mongolia) and Fujiamen (Gansu province). Examples from the south include a sheep scapula excavated at the site Xiawanggang in Henan province, dated either to the late Yangshao or Longshan period. Despite the presence of these bones at an early point, it was only during the middle third millennium BCE, during the dynamic Longshanoid period, that divination became properly established.

Longshan type-sites provide typical examples for necessary divination by independent practitioners. Representative of Longshan are at least 20 scapulae in Kangjia (Lintong, Shanxi); although they date back to the early third millennium BCE, they posed similarities to late-millennium oracle bones. Unlike their Shang counterparts, Longshan bones were neither pretreated nor inflicted with drilled holes and chisel marks before the burning process. Divination marks are scattered on the bones with no clear regulating principles. Excavations have revealed similar examples from various places. Some come from Longshan sites such as Yangbai (Wutai, Shanxi), Taosi, and Shangpo (Xiping, Henan). In addition, there are also oracle bones of such kind from the Qijia culture site Dahezhuang (Gansu) and the previously mentioned Xiawanggang samples.

Elaborate pyromancy developed gradually and haphazardly as cultures transitioned into the Bronze Age. The oldest examples of pretreatment belong to the Lower Xiajiadian culture in the Northeast, although the elaboration shift was most significant in the Central Plains. In these cases, diviners drilled holes into bones before burning in order to control cracking; one such bone has on it up to 37 holes. Elaboration took hold in the Erlitou culture slowly – oracle bones throughout all four Erlitou phases show the absence of pretreatment prior to heat application – but it eventually adopted the tradition which would then be passed down to the Shang.

=== Theory of early shamanism ===
Shamanism as a term has various definitions, and its exact meaning has been a topic of contention among academics of cultural anthropology; it has yet to have a conclusive and unitary definition. David Keightley offered that in the contexts of ancient Chinese studies, a shaman could be defined as a medium between the spirit and human worlds, one who travelled to the realm of gods and demons by epilepsy and autohypnotic trances for spiritual communication; in other words, his soul would depart from his body during the concerned ceremony that he performed. The shaman's techniques, according to Keightley, included but were not limited to dancing, ventriloquy and juggling. (Note: Keightley also claimed that in some cases, shamanism may not involve trance and ecstacy.)

The authoritative voice in the field of ancient Chinese shamanism is K. C. Chang, who in the 1980s introduced his theory about the topic. Chang viewed Neolithic imagery of the Yangshao, Longshan and Liangzhu cultures as representations of shamanic visions or metamorphosis. He also contended that shamanic power was vested in the ruling elites who monopolized it as head mediums. Many sinologists, including Keightley, have expressed disagreement with Chang's shamanic hypothesis.

Evidence from the Chinese Neolithic suggests practices reminiscent of shamanism. In particular, occupants of some burials at the Niuheliang site might be shamans. Dancing figures have been identified in a Yangshao-era pot excavated in Datong (Qinghai). Those figures together with depictions of skeletons and human-headed frogs, as well as a hermaphroditic human figurine in Liuwan (Qinghai) have been interpreted to be resonant with shamanism. The famous jade cong tubes of the Liangzhu culture, whose design encloses circles inside squares, have also been identified as possibly bearing shamanistic meanings. Drawing from ideologies current during the Zhou to Han dynasties, Chang commented on these jades:

...as shamanistic symbols or tools, the circular shape symbolizing heaven, the square shape symbolizing earth; the hollow tube is the axis mundi connecting the different world and the animal decorations portray the shaman's helpers. In short, the cong encapsulates the principal elements of the shamanistic cosmology.

— K. C. Chang

Chang's theory was met with scrutiny from Keightley, who argued that there was little empirical strength to prove the existence of shamanism suggested by the cong imagery, and that such existence may be inspected via observations of how the prehistoric Chinese practiced funerary traditions. Aside from the description, Chang also proposed a connection between early Chinese shamanism and that of the Maya civilization in the Americas, with a possible common ancestor emerging in the Transbaikal region.

=== Mortuary rituals ===
Burial constitutes a type of religious activity. The oldest instances of deliberate burials in China dates from the Upper Paleolithic, and was popularized during the Neolithic. According to Richard Pearson, several meanings of Neolithic Chinese burials have been inferred, although Western academics have brought some among those to closer scrutiny:

1. These burials reflect social groups as well as subgroups;
2. Burial orientations are observed in various sites, together with collective burials;
3. Sociopolitical status is reflected through grave sizes, grave goods, coffin complexity, and corpse postures;
4. Tools buried with the interred suggest patterns in labor divisions.

Prehistoric Chinese practiced secondary burials, in which the majority of skeletons would be removed from their primary burial pits. Such burials appeared during the early Neolithic and began to be collectively practiced in the early fifth millennium BCE. They were ritualized, and the deceased were only considered dead after their skeletons had been laid out properly in their graves. The Dawenkou culture might have practiced secondary burials around the transition from the fifth to fourth millennium BCE. Secondary-buried corpses may or may not share a grave with a primary interment. The extent of these burials may indicate communal rituals conducted by the dead's kinsmen at the time of the second interment, but it is not known whether they were hosted by shamans.

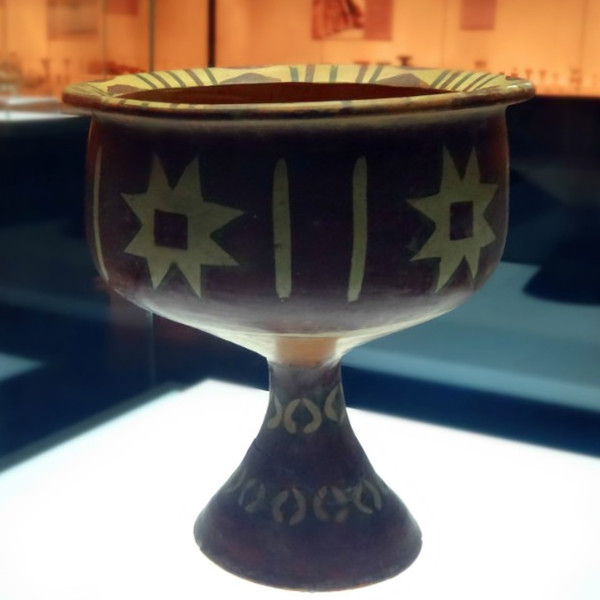
Dou vessel of the Dawenkou culture.

Early Chinese cultures expressed dedication to postures of the dead. Already by the end of the fifth millennium BCE, human corpses had been buried in identical postures and with regards to orientations. Eastern cultures interred the dead with heads pointing to directions between east and north, while northwestern peoples oriented the dead to the west and northwest. Orientation preferences were arguably strong and even influenced secondary burials, as exemplified by the Yuanjunmiao cemetery in Shaanxi (around 5000 – 4500 BCE). These orientation traditions were dictated by contemporary religious and cosmological thoughts, but likely varied based on geographical regions or social status of the dead.

Yangshao collective burials mainly existed during the Banpo phase; most during other times feature single-person burial practices. The dead sharing common graves were likely those whose deaths had been close in time. Based on certain criteria that suggest female supremacy in Yangshao burials, some academics proposed that the Yangshao society was matrilineal. Rank differentiation in Yangshao interments was also evident from grave goods made from prestige materials.

The Neolithic Chinese also practiced urn burial, although the tradition seemed to be restricted to children interments. Urn burial was most practiced in Yangshao sites around the Yellow River and Wei River valleys, and it seemed to follow certain bone arrangement principles. Covering urns were lids with beautiful decorations, suggesting that they used to belong to the dead children and their decorations were solely for pleasing the deceased.

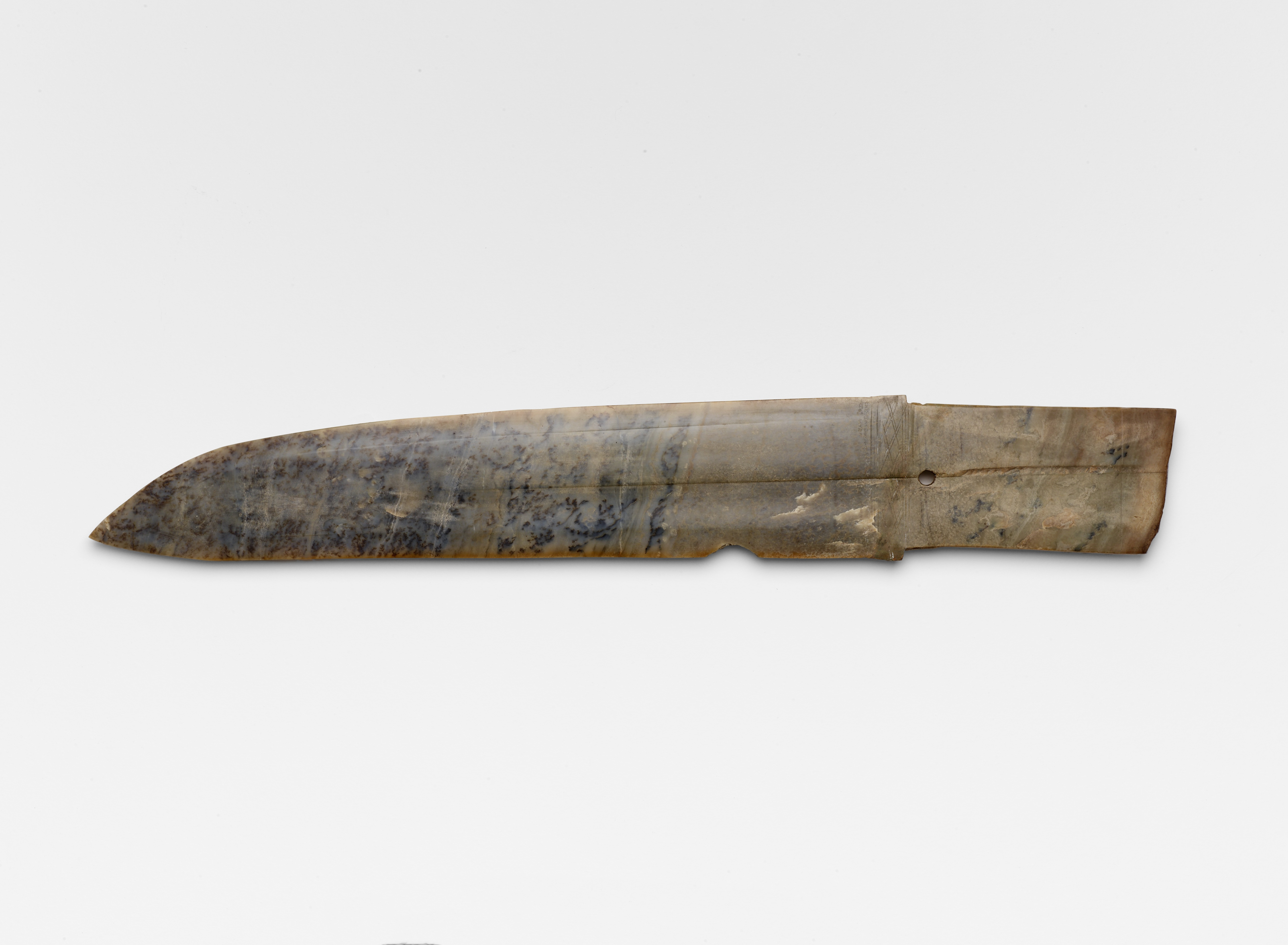
Erlitou bronze ge dagger-axe which adorns elite burials

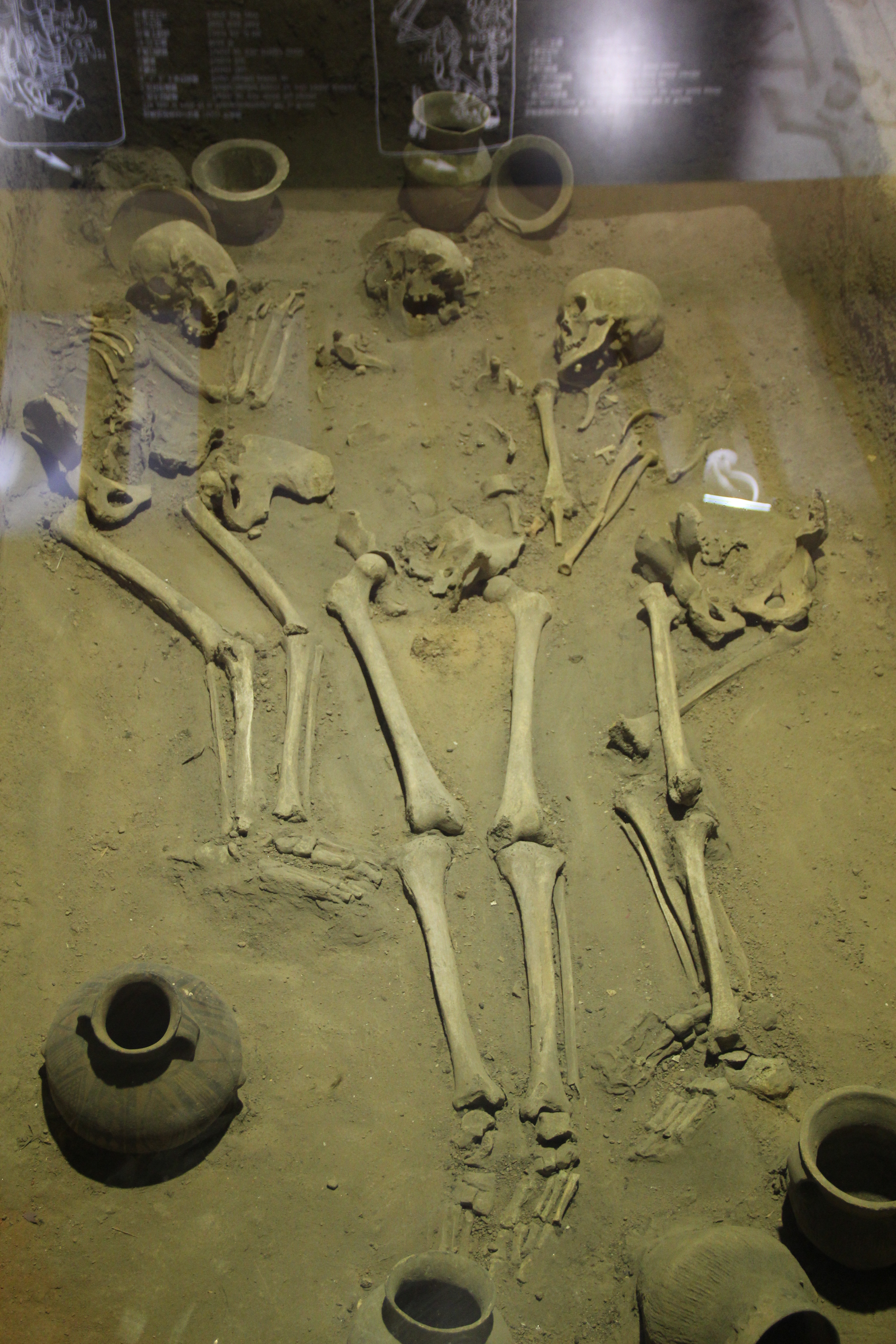
Interred skeletons excavated in Qijia culture sites

As settlements increased in number, funerary traditions were conducted more frequently and mortuary values associated with them were further articulated. Already during the Neolithic, mourners had formed distinctions between vessels buried near the corpses and those at greater distances. By the third millennium BCE, the presence of several vessels such as the dou and bei in eastern graves indicate the presence of funeral banquets. Examples found at Dawenkou suggest larger numbers of feasting mourners during male interments. Also at Dawenkou, bei goblets were buried as representations of vitality as well as resistance to death and sterility.

Some burials were laid out in accordance with cosmological beliefs, particularly the celestial pole and its surrounding stars. For example, the Yangshao tomb M45 in Xishuipo, Henan province, features its owner lying between figures of guardian beasts; the tomb owner's position aligned precisely with a polar meridian constituted by constellations Draconis, Ursa Major, and Hercules.

Longshan mortuary traditions reflect its changing social order. Disparities in various grave characteristics such as size, structure, and grave goods suggest social hierarchies present in Longshan. Spatial differences of its human remains also arose as a result of kinship. The deceased of this culture were also buried with artifacts adorned by motifs similar to the taotie of the Shang.

Mortuary hierarchies of Longshan were similar to those of Erlitou in that burials suggest clear distinctions in social status among the interred. Erlitou elite graves feature wood coffins, mattresses, cinnabars, and the ercengtai perimetral design. Their human skeletons were laid supine, often with the same set of grave goods – two wine vessels, a ge dagger-axe, a qi battle-axe, and accompanying jades. Graves of common people feature neither ercengtai design nor cinnabar layers but still contain various grave goods. There were also burials reserved for slaves.

Qijia-type burials also reflect inequality in both wealth and social standings. Such interments were collective and their grave goods generally consist of pottery, stones, jades and bronzes. At a site in Gansu, some graves have up to 83 pottery artifacts while some have little or nothing at all. At the Dahezhuang site, some burials feature up to 68 bone fragments compared to only one such fragment in others.

=== Sacrifices and ritual use of animals ===
Sacrificial rituals in China traced their origins back to the Paleolithic, with evidences for the tradition of burying sacrifices dated to the Longshan period. Evidence from the Shandong region suggests that sacrificial pits were closely associated with ancestor worship.

No traces of sacrificial rituals have been found at the Baodun site of Sichuan during the same period, but sacrifices in the Sichuan area is assumed to have been influenced by those of Central Plain cultures. Human sacrifice is observed within the site of Sanxingdui, whose kneeling figurines probably depict sacrificial victims offered to appease deities, whether they were mountain spirits, the sun, or the omniscient god. The Sanxingdui also offered ivories and bronze masks. Their sacrificial rituals consist of a burning step and a following procedure in which burnt sacrifices were placed into sacrificial pits, and were conducted as attempts to mediate between heaven and earth and to request divine blessings.

Animal sacrifice to the dead served multiple purposes, such as facilitating hierarchical enhancement, providing the dead with postmortem food, and being consumed by the feasting mourners. Mortuary use of dogs in prehistoric China appeared in the Peiligang culture, and dog burials before Yangshao have only been confirmed at the Jiahu site. They spread to the Han river area during early Yangshao times, to the Huai river area during the Dawenkou period, and to the lower Yangtze during the late Liangzhu and early Longshan. Dog burials may be associated with beliefs that they offered dead owners spiritual protection or accompany them in the afterlife, and might be related to their ceramic depiction as guardians of lost souls.

Aside from dogs, the Neolithic Chinese also used pigs and tortoises as mortuary animals. Burial of pig skulls and mandibles took root in North China as early as the sixth millennium BCE, spreading to the south during the middle and late Neolithic. (Note: Liu Li suggests that the Chinese tradition of using pigs as ritual food traces its origins to prehistory.) Pig skull burial was very prevalent in most Yangshao, Longshan and Dawenkou sites. These interments were usually accompanied by prestige goods, suggesting that pigs were seen as symbols of socioeconomic superiority. In some sites such as Taosi, several large tombs contain whole pigs instead of pig parts. However, cattle – considered highly religious symbols at the time of their introduction to prehistoric China – gradually replaced pigs as the most prevalent sacrificial animals.

Since the Longshan era, both humans and animals have been buried near manmade structures as part of rituals associated with construction. Later with the intensification of warfare in the region, war rituals were conducted near walled buildings with human victims, gradually replacing pottery as the main component of war ritual offerings. Examples of such rituals have been found at Taosi and Shimao, and persisted until the Zhou dynasty.

=== Other activities ===
Although direct evidence of alcohol at the Jiahu site has yet to be found, it is likely that its inhabitants utilized it for ritual use, possibly during burials. Some excavations in Gansu province revealed what remains of a floor painting in black carbonized pigments dated partly to the Majiayao culture. The humans of the painting are depicted as silhouettes and standing cross-legged, suggesting possible contexts of sympathetic magic, dance, sexual customs and hunting rituals.

== Sociopolitical impacts ==
=== Social integration ===
Throughout Chinese prehistory, ritual served as a means for social integration. In particular, funerary ceremonies functioned as a way to solidify a familial group, by connecting participants to the deceased or by forging common identities between biological relatives. Similarly, funeral-related feasts and alcohol drinking were to create solidarity between participants through behavioral and material means. Based on ritual remains of the Shijiahe culture, academics have suggested that this impact might also have created alliances and promoted strategic regional politics.

=== Political legitimacy ===
As early as 3000 BCE, Neolithic elites had claimed for themselves the ability to both see the divine naturalistically and understand them schematically. It is reflected by a universal aesthetic convention of that time which embraced both naturalistic and abstract representations.

Liangzhu rulers were regarded as representing godly powers on earth, allowing the society to exist under centralized rule as well as the unity of faith, with divine authority conveniently utilized by Liangzhu rulers who communicated with spirits. With the Liangzhu supreme deity likely manifesting itself on the celestial pole area, only the elites were able to reach out to it through stellar emblems. Rulership of the Hongshan culture, which was probably divided into different chieftainships with varying degrees of relationship to one another, appears to have followed a similar approach. Hongshan chieftains likely based their ruling legitimacy upon references to religious authority together with personal charisma and military successes.

During the early state formation period, the elites might have monopolized religious activities and through that secured political stability. At Sanxingdui, whose religion likely conflated the sun with rulers, both secular and religious power were probably concentrated in a single individual. Many Sanxingdui bronze objects may represent such religious leaders. This way, the power and influence of the ruling class were maximized and penetrated into virtually every aspect of communal life.

Ritual buildings of two Hongshan sites, Dongshanzui and Niuheliang, were different in that the former supported a general body of ritual audiences while the latter was probably accessible only to the elites. Scholars have interpreted this disparity as a sign that Neolithic elites had transformed the earlier common religion into a religion of inequality. Also towards the Late Neolithic, religious beliefs also served to legitimize the decline of earlier egalitarian social structures.

== Traditional accounts ==
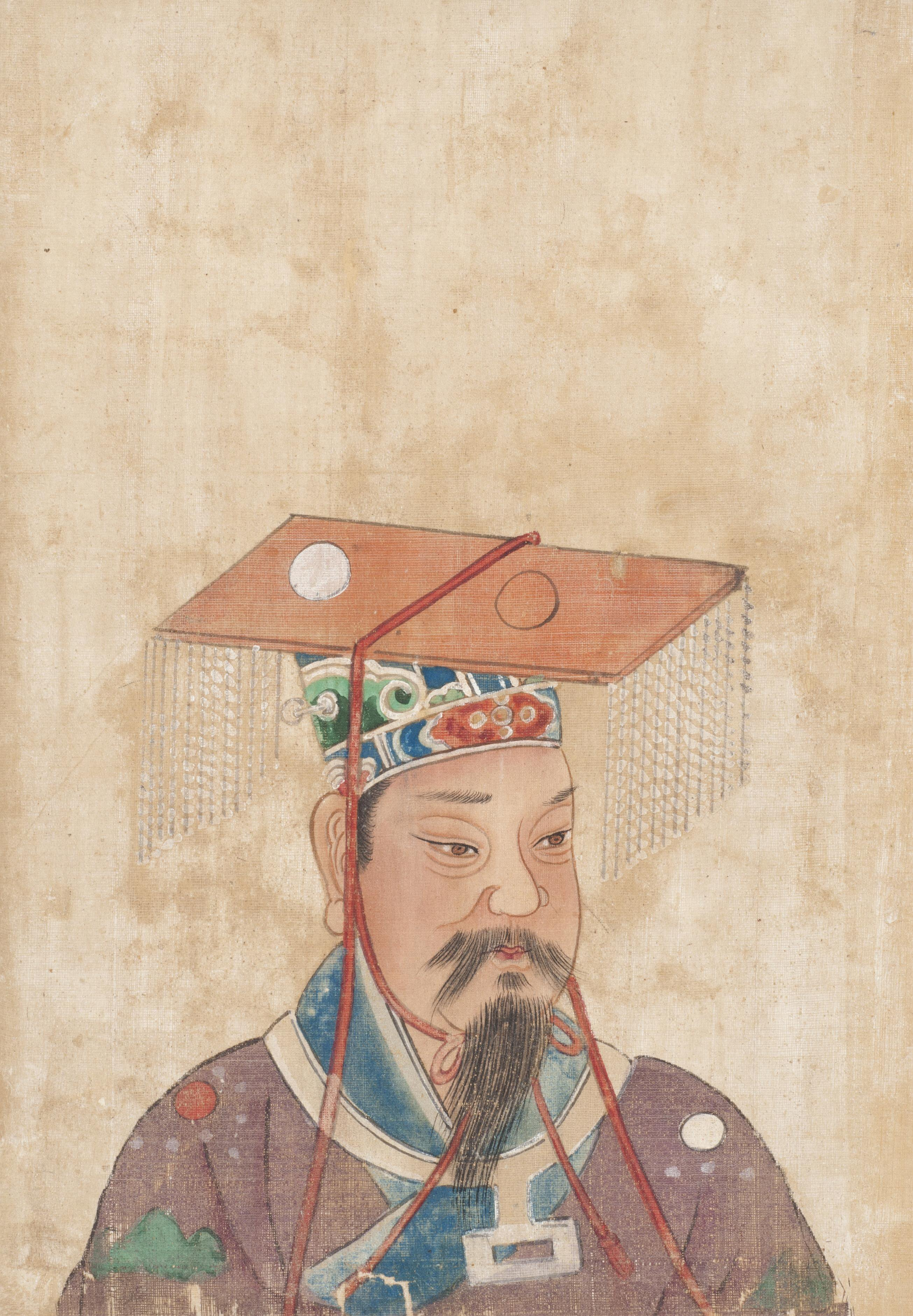
The Yellow Emperor depicted in the album Portraits of Famous Men c. 1900 CE, housed in the Philadelphia Museum of Art

=== Three Sovereigns and Five Emperors ===
Many classical Chinese accounts are employed by archaeologists in understanding Neolithic and Bronze Age religion. Some classical Chinese literature from the Zhou and Han dynasties makes references to the remote past which they perceived as a succeeding line of primordial rulers in the Central Plain. For example, the Guoyu (國語; 'Discourses of the States') from the Eastern Zhou period (771 – 256 BCE) describes early shamanism:

In ancient times men and spirits did not intermingle. At that time there were certain persons who were so perspicacious, single-minded, and reverential that their understanding enabled them to make meaningful collation of what lies above and below, and their insight to illumine what is distant and profound. Therefore, the spirits would descend into them. The possession of such powers were, if men, called hsi (shamans), and, if women, wu (shamanesses) …

— Discourses of the States, ch. Discourses of Chu

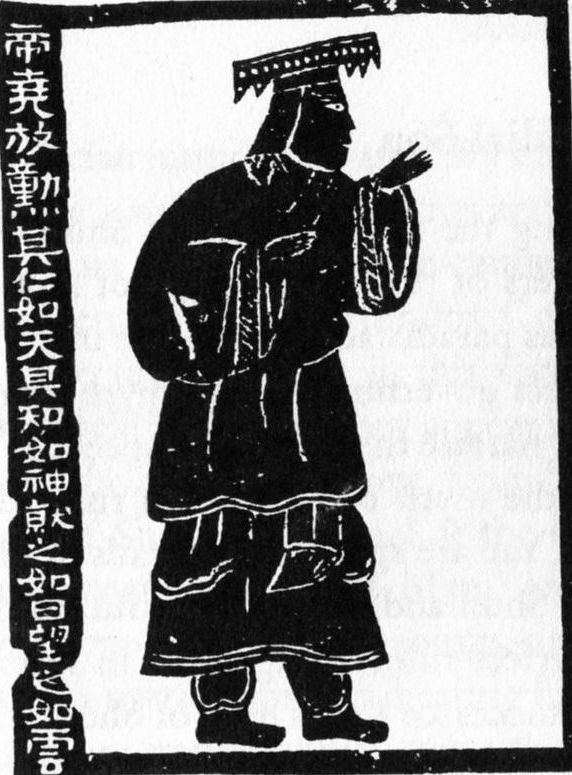
Han dynasty depiction of Emperor Yao

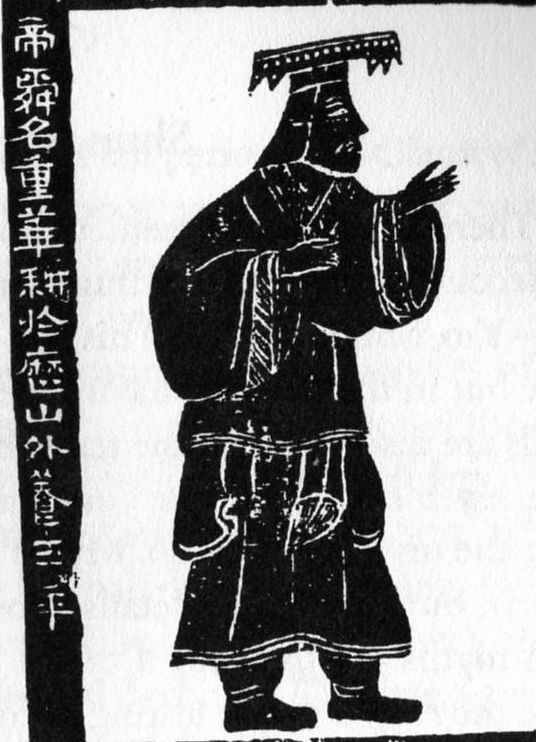
Emperor Shun

Various spiritual activities were credited to the legendary Yellow Emperor (黃帝; Huángdì); trad. 2698 – 2598 BCE). The Bamboo Annals describes his practices as including tortoise-shell divination and sacrifices. The Han dynasty historian Sima Qian (c. 145 – 86 BCE) credited the Yellow Emperor with worship of spirits, mountains, rivers, as well as heaven and earth. According to Han scholars, there existed a construction called a mingtang designed for this emperor's ritual activities.

Also traditionally placed during the third millennium BCE, the Emperor Zhuanxu was described as listening to the spirits in regulating human thoughts and actions. He also educated people to sacrifice to the spirits the purest materials with utmost reverence. Sima Qian wrote in his work that a great-grandson of the Yellow Emperor called Ku also attempted to understand the spirits and worship them.

The Emperor Yao (trad. third millennium BCE) purportedly commissioned the Xi and He to make calendrical calculations with astronomical motions. Yao also appears in the Bamboo Annals to have practiced sacrifice. His successor Emperor Shun worshipped by sacrificing many beings, including the Six Honored Ones, hills, rivers, and hosts of spirits. In the classical Book of Documents chapter "The Counsels of the Great Yu", Shun is quoted as consulting the spirits by tortoise shells following Yu's counsels. Confucius wrote in the Doctrine of the Mean that Shun had established his own ancestral temples, in which his successor Yu the Great received appointment as ruler.

=== Xia dynasty ===
Traditional Chinese accounts describe deity veneration as also present during the Xia dynasty (2070 – 1600 BCE) that purportedly preceded the Shang. For example, the Xia's second sovereign Qi was described in multiple texts as a spirit-medium who communicated with the high deity Shangdi and performed sacrifices to the deceased. In the Book of Documents, Qi gave a speech in which a belief in Heaven and spirits of the land is reflected. This classical text describes Xia rulers believing that they possessed Heaven's appointment to punish those deemed unworthy. In addition, the Rites of Zhou refer to ancestral temples purportedly erected by the Xia.
