= Hans Bielenstein =

Swedish-American sinologist (1920-2015)

- Born: 8 April 1920; Stockholm, Sweden
- Died: 8 March 2015 (aged 94); New York City, New York, United States
- Education: Stockholm University (PhD)
- Known for: Han dynasty studies
- Spouse: Gabrielle Maupin Bielenstein
- Children: Danielle Erika Mary and Andrea Johanna Gabrielle Bielenstein
- Scientific career
- Fields: Chinese history
- Workplaces: Columbia University; Australian National University
- Doctoral advisor: Bernhard Karlgren
- Notable students: David Keightley

Chinese name
- Traditional Chinese: 畢漢思
- Simplified Chinese: 毕汉思
Transcriptions
Standard Mandarin
- Hanyu Pinyin: Bì Hànsī
- Gwoyeu Romatzyh: Bih Hannsy
- Wade–Giles: Pi^{4} Han^{4}-ssu^{1}

Hans Henrik August Bielenstein (8 April 1920 − 8 March 2015) was a Swedish sinologist and Dean Lung Professor Emeritus from Columbia University specialising in the history of the Han dynasty.

== Life ==
Hans Henrik August Bielenstein was born on 8 April 1920 in Stockholm, Sweden. He attended private school in Stockholm and took the matriculation exam in 1939. After the outbreak of the Winter War, 1939–40, he joined the Swedish Voluntary Corps as a commando and fought the Russians in Finnish Lapland. After his return, he entered the Guards Regiment.

In 1945, he decided to devote himself to Chinese studies and earned a Ph.D. in sinology at Stockholm University. He studied history and oriental studies under the tutelage of the renowned Bernhard Karlgren. He earned his master's degree in 1945 and his licentiate in 1947.

He spent the year of 1952 as a research visitor at the University of California, Berkeley. In 1952, Bielenstein was appointed head of the School of Oriental Languages in Canberra University College in Canberra, Australia (since 1960 part of Australian National University). Bielenstein was the first professor of modern or classical Chinese language anywhere in Australia. As Head of the School of Oriental Studies, he built up departments for the languages, literatures and history of China, Japan, Southeast Asia and India.

In 1961, he moved to Columbia University in New York City. From 1969 to 1977 he was chairman of the Department of East Asian Languages and Cultures.

He was a Guggenheim fellow in 1967–1968, became a Corresponding Member of the Royal Academy of Literature, History, and Antiquity of Sweden in 1980, being appointed to the Dean Lung Chair of Chinese at Columbia University in 1985. From 1994 to 1995, he was the Master of Holland Lodge. He retired in 1990 and celebrated his 61st wedding anniversary in 2015.

Bielenstein's many books and articles were concerned with Chinese, historiography, history and demography. His area of concentration was the administrative and economic history of early imperial China from the Han dynasty to the Song dynasty. Along with the works of Michael Loewe, Bielenstein's Bureaucracy of Han Times (1980) is one of the most important English-language works on the government of the Han dynasty.

He died in New York City on 8 March 2015. He remained a Swedish citizen until his death.

== Selected publications ==
- Bielenstein, Hans (1947). "The census of China during the period 2–742 A.D." Bulletin of the Museum of Far Eastern Antiquities. 19: 125–163.
- "The Restoration of the Han Dynasty, with Prolegomena on the Historiography of the Hou Han Shu". Bulletin of the Museum of Far Eastern Antiquities. Stockholm. 4 vols. BMFEA 26: 1–209. 1954; 31: 1–287. 1959; 39:1–198. 1967; 51: 1–300. 1979.
- Bielenstein, Hans; Sivin, Nathan (April–June 1977). "Further comments on the use of statistics in the study of Han dynasty portents". Journal of the American Oriental Society. 97 (2): 185–187. doi:10.2307/599008. JSTOR 599008. Co-authored with Nathan Sivin.
- The Bureaucracy of Han Times. Cambridge: Cambridge University Press. 1980. ISBN 978-0-521-22510-6.
- Diplomacy and Trade in the Chinese World, 589–1276. Leiden: Brill. 2005. ISBN 90-04-14416-1.
