= Johan August Lundell =

Swedish linguist (1851-1940)

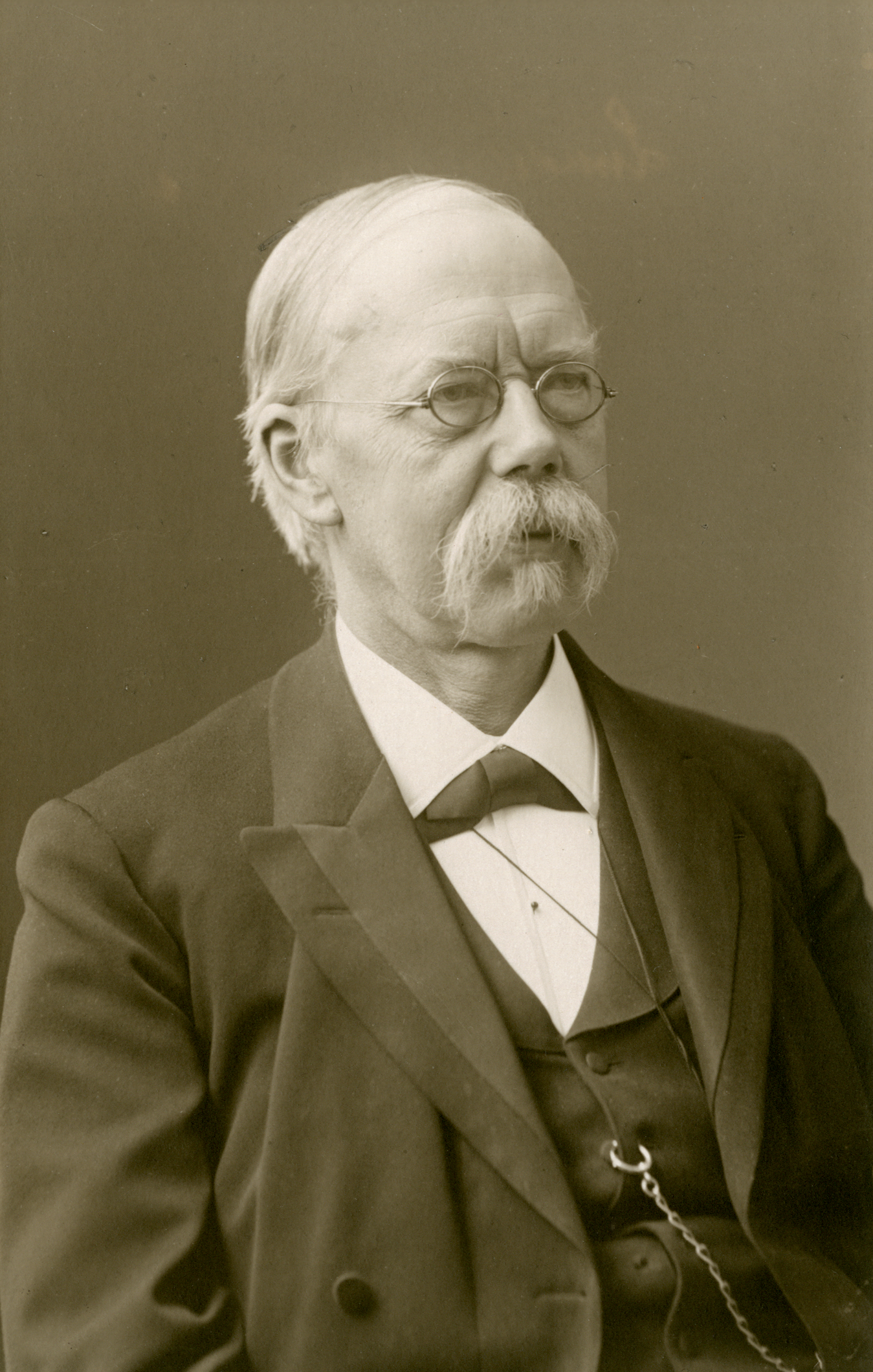
Johan August Lundell ca 1920.

Johan August Lundell (25 July 1851 in Kläckeberga, Möre – 28 January 1940 in Uppsala) was a Swedish linguist, professor of Slavic languages at Uppsala University. He is known for his work on Swedish dialects and for developing Landsmålsalfabetet, a phonetic alphabet used in dialect research.

== Biography ==
Lundell's parents were Anders Andersson and Carolina Olsdotter. He began his studies at Uppsala University in 1871 and received his Bachelor of Arts degree in 1876. In years 1880 - 1885, he worked as amanuensis at the Uppsala University Library.

It was during the studies in Uppsala that his interest in Swedish dialects arose. He created Landsmålsalfabetet in 1878. In the same year, he founded the annual journal Svenska landsmål och svenskt folkliv ("Swedish Dialects and Folk Traditions"), which as of 2010 is still published. He was editor in chief of the journal for many years.

In 1882, Lundell became the first Swedish associate professor (docent) in phonetics, and in 1891 the first professor in Slavic languages. In Uppsala, he taught Bulgarian, Old Church Slavonic, Serbian, Polish and Russian. In 1893, he received an honorary degree at Uppsala University.

In 1892, Lundell founded Upsala Enskilda Läroverk, a private secondary school in Uppsala. Since 1960, when it was transformed into a public school, it has been known as Lundellska skolan ("The Lundell School").

Lundell married Marie-Louise Jönsson in 1882.
