= David Keightley =

American historian and sinologist (1932–2017)

David Noel Keightley (October 25, 1932 – February 23, 2017) was an American sinologist. He was a professor of Chinese history at the University of California, Berkeley, as well as a published author covering the Shang and Zhou dynasties and the Chinese Bronze Age. He was best known for his studies of Chinese oracle bones and oracle bone script. His work changed the way that many Sinologists viewed Shang dynasty history.

== Life ==
David N. Keightley was born on October 25, 1932, in London, England. David received his early education in English boarding schools until the age of 15. In 1947 his family moved to Evanston, Illinois. He graduated from Evanston Township High School, then attended Amherst College as an undergraduate student, graduating in 1953 with a B.A. in English with a minor in biochemistry. He then received a Fulbright Scholarship, which he used to study Medieval French at the University of Lille. He received an M.A. in modern European history from New York University in 1956. He then worked for several years at publishing companies in New York City and as a freelance writer before beginning his study of Chinese and Sinology.

Keightley began his graduate study in East Asian history at Columbia University in 1962. In 1965, Keightley moved to Taipei, Taiwan where he studied Chinese for two years at the Stanford Center (modern Inter-University Program for Chinese Language Study). He then returned to the United States to complete his doctoral studies at Columbia under the Swedish Sinologist Hans Bielenstein and received a Ph.D. in 1969 with a dissertation entitled "Public Work in Ancient China: A Study of Forced Labor in the Shang and Early Chou".

After receiving his Ph.D. in 1969, Keightley was selected to replace Woodbridge Bingham (1901–1986) as professor of East Asian history at the University of California, Berkeley. Keightley became one of the leading Western scholars of Chinese oracle bones, which contain the earliest known examples of Chinese writing. In 1995, the American Sinologist Edward Shaughnessy stated that Keightley "has done more to introduce the depth and breadth of early China's oracle-bone divination to Western readers than any [other] scholar." He taught and worked at Berkeley until his retirement in 1998.

Keightley died at his home on February 23, 2017, aged 84.

== Career literary works ==
Keightley's career into research on Chinese society and oracle bone inscription began with his dissertation "Public Work in Ancient China: A Study of Forced Labor in the Shang and Early Chou". This essay introduced Keightley's work with early Chinese culture. It "Examines the Shang and Zhou states' control of labor resources, namely the 'comprehensive system of labor mobilization in which the same conscripts were sent to fight, clear and farm the land, build city walls and buildings, and work at the sundry tasks of production and manufacture required by the ruling class.'" Relies primarily on the oracle-bone inscriptions of the Shang period, on Western Zhou bronze inscriptions, and on the early sections of the Shangshu and the Shijing. This dissertation served as the building block for Keightley's later works.

After writing his dissertation, Keightley went on to write several books and articles, as well as, working as an editor and contributor on several other works. He namely wrote "Sources of Shang History: The Oracle-bone Inscriptions of Bronze Age China". This book expanded his research into Chinese oracle-bone inscriptions. His next work was "The Ancestral Landscape: Time, Space, and Community in Late Shang China". This book was, "Primarily a study in retrospective cultural anthropology" that is based on oracle-bone inscriptions. It provided insight into the life of the Shang kings. His third writing "Working for His Majesty: Research Notes on Labor Mobilization in Late Shang China as Seen in the Oracle-Bone Inscriptions, with Particular Attention to Handicraft Industries, Agriculture, Warfare, Hunting, Construction, and the Shang's Legacies." This study of oracle-bone inscriptions helped to increase understanding of the ideologies and administrative practices of the Shang Dynasty. Finally all of his works culminate in "These Bones Shall Rise Again: Selected Writings on Early China". This collection of 12 essays looks to explore early Chinese civilization through the study of oracle-bone inscriptions and anthropological studies.

Along with his novels and collections of essays, Keightley also wrote articles for many academic papers, studies, encyclopedias, historical journals, and several other publications.

== Work on oracle bones ==
Keightley was best known for his work on oracle bones and their ability to tell the history of Shang China. His work on oracle bone research is discussed in several of his articles and edits, "Sources of Shang History: The Oracle-Bone Inscriptions of Bronze Age China" goes most in depth about the history on oracle bones. He delves into discussing the physical material in which the inscriptions were inscribed upon. Through the study of these physical materials, he studies a particular character which he calls "the charge". This character was previously thought to hold meaning as an interrogative figure. Yet, through his work and reading of the bones and shells, he decides that this character rather signals a prayer or statement of intent. This discovery changed the way that many previous inscriptions of Shang dynasty inscriptions were interpreted.

From his studies, Keightley also made ten volumes of oracle bone inscriptions that are still used to debate facts about the period of the Shang kings. Many of these debates revolve around the dating of artifacts and the actual time periods in which several Shang rules lived. Keightley dedicated his time and this research to improve the authenticity, accuracy, and the ability to reproduce these inscriptions. These studies and inscriptions are still very prevalent and useful in ancient Chinese studies and arguments about the Shang dynasty.

== Awards ==
- 1978 Guggenheim Fellowship
  - Keightley was awarded this grant for publishing the book "Sources of Shang History: The Oracle Bone Inscriptions of Bronze Age China".
- 1986 MacArthur Fellows Program
  - Keightley received this award for his extraordinary work and expertise on Chinese oracle bones.

== Books ==
- Keightley, David N. (1969). "Public Work in Ancient China: A Study of Forced Labor in the Shang and Early Chou". Ph.D. dissertation (Columbia University).
- Keightley, David N., ed. (1978). Sources of Shang History: The Oracle-Bone Inscriptions of Bronze Age China. Berkeley, Los Angeles: University of California Press.
- Keightley, David N. "The Shang: China's First Historical Dynasty". In Loewe, Michael; Shaughnessy, Edward (eds.). The Cambridge History of Ancient China.
- Keightley, David N. (2000). The Ancestral Landscape: Time, Space, and Community in Late Shang China (ca. 1200-1045 B.C.). Berkeley: Institute of East Asian Studies, University of California, Berkeley
- Keightley, David N. (2014). These Bones Shall Rise Again: Selected Writings on Early China. Albany: SUNY Press.

== Articles ==
- "Archaeology and History in Chinese Society." In W.W. Howells and Patricia Tuschitani, eds., Paleoanthropology in the People's Republic of China. Washington, D.C.: National Academy of Sciences, 1977:123-129.
- "On the Misuse of Ancient Chinese Inscriptions: An Astronomical Fantasy." History of Science 15 (1977):267-272.
- "Space Travel in Bronze Age China?" 'The Skeptical Inquirer 3.2 (Winter 1978):58-63
- "The Religious Commitment: Shang Theology and the Genesis of Chinese Political Culture." History of Religions 17 (1978):211-224
- "The Bamboo Annals and Shang-Chou Chronology." Harvard journal of Asiatic Studies 38 (1978):423-438
- "The Shang State as Seen in the Oracle-Bone Inscriptions." Early China 5 (1979–80):25-34
- "The State," "Divination," "Religion," "The Economy," "Bronze Working," in Brian Hook, ed., The Cambridge Encyclopedia of China. Cambridge: Cambridge University Press, 1982. pp. 163–65.
- "The Late Shang State: When, Where, and What?" in Keightley, ed., The Origins of Chinese Civilization (1983):523-564
- "Late Shang Divination: The Magico-Religious Legacy." In Henry Rosemont Jr., ed., Explorations in Early Chinese Cosmology. Journal of the American Academy of Religion Studies 50.2 (1984): 11–34
- "Reports from the Shang: A Correction and Some Speculations." Early China 9-10 (1983- 1985):20-39, 47–54
- "Main Trends in American Studies of Chinese History: Neolithic to Imperial Times," The History Teacher 19.4 (August 1986):527-543
- "Archaeology and Mentality: The Making of China." Representations 18 (Spring 1987):91-128.
- "Prehistory" and "The First Historical Dynasty: The Shang." The New Encyclopædia Britannica: Macropaedia (Chicago 1987) 16:62-67
- Astrology and Cosmology in the Shang Oracle-Bone Inscriptions." Cosmos 3 (1987):36-40
- "Shang Dynasty," in Ainslie T. Embree, ed., Encyclopedia of Asian History (New York, Scribner's: 1988) 3:426-429
- [Translator] Wang Ningsheng, "Yangshao Burial Customs and Social Organization: A Comment on the Theory of Yangshao Matrilineal Society and Its Methodology," Early China 11-12 (1985–87):Cr-32
- "Shang Divination and Metaphysics," Philosophy East and West 38.4 (October 1988):367-397
- [Translator, with Igarashi Yoshikuni] Toyoda Hidashi and lnoo Hideyuki, "Shigaku zasshi: Summary of Japanese Scholarship," Early China 13 (1988): 297–327
- "The Origins of Writing in China: Scripts and Cultural Contexts," in Wayne M. Senner, ed., The Origins of Writing (University of Nebraska Press, 1989):171-202
- "Comment" (in the Early China Forum on Qiu Xigui, "An Examination of Whether the Charges in Shang Oracle-Bone Inscriptions Are Questions"), Early China 14 (1989):138-46
- '"There Was an Old Man of Changan...': Limericks and the Teaching of Early Chinese History," The History Teacher 22.3 (May 1989):325-28.
- (1978). "The Religious Commitment: Shang Theology and the Genesis of Chinese Political Culture". History of Religions. 17 (3/4): 211–225. doi:10.1086/462791. JSTOR 1062429. S2CID 162252497.
