= Yang Naisi =

Chinese linguist and research professor (1927–2019)

- 杨耐思
- Born: October 20, 1927; Linxiang, Hunan, China
- Died: March 5, 2019 (aged 91); Beijing, China
- Known for: Study of modern Chinese phonology, ʼPhags-pa script, and Xiang Chinese
- Awards: Wang Li Linguistics Prize (1986)

Academic background
- Education: Peking University; Institute of Linguistics of the Chinese Academy of Social Sciences
- Doctoral advisor: Luo Changpei, Lu Zhiwei

Academic work
- Discipline: Linguist
- Sub-discipline: Chinese linguistics
- Institutions: Institute of Linguistics of the Chinese Academy of Social Sciences

Yang Naisi (Chinese: 杨耐思; Wade–Giles: Yang Nai-ssu; 20 October 1927 – 5 March 2019), also known by his pen name Yang Daojing (杨道经), was a Chinese linguist and a research professor at the Institute of Linguistics of the Chinese Academy of Social Sciences. He was noted for his research on modern Chinese phonology, the ʼPhags-pa script, and Xiang Chinese.

== Life and career ==
Yang was born on 20 October 1927 in Linxiang, Hunan, Republic of China. His father participated and died in the revolutions of the tumultuous period, and his mother also died early. Orphaned at young ages, Yang and his brother were raised by their aunt and grew up in poverty.

After graduating from high school in Yueyang, Yang entered the Department of Linguistics of Sun Yat-sen University in 1951. When the new Communist government reorganized China's universities on the Soviet model, Yang's department was merged into the Department of Chinese of Peking University, and Yang transferred to PKU in 1954.

After graduating from Peking University in 1955, Yang was admitted as a graduate student at the Institute of Linguistics of the Chinese Academy of Sciences. He studied historical Chinese phonology under advisors Luo Changpei and Lu Zhiwei, and earned his associate doctor degree in 1960. He subsequently worked at the Institute of Linguistics (which became part of the Chinese Academy of Social Sciences in 1977) for his entire career.

== Contributions ==
Yang made significant contributions in Chinese phonology, Xiang Chinese, and Standard Chinese orthography. His research on the ʼPhags-pa script, Zhongyuan Yinyun, and the development of modern Chinese phonology is especially influential. His major works include Menggu Ziyun Jiaoben (蒙古字韵校本; A critical edition of the Menggu Ziyun), co-authored with Junast in 1987; Zhongyuan Yinyun Yinxi (中原音韵音系; The phonological system of Zhongyuan Yinyun); and Jindai Hanyu Yinlun (近代汉语音论; A treatise on modern Chinese phonology).

Yang was awarded the Wang Li Linguistics Prize in 1986. He was awarded a special pension by the State Council of China in 1992.

== Personal life ==
Yang's wife died in her middle age and his son predeceased him in 2011. Yang's brother also died early, and he financially supported his sister-in-law and nephew Yang Wensheng.

Yang died on 5 March 2019 at Beijing Hospital at the age of 91. He was survived by his grandson Wang Baolin and other grandchildren.
