= Yulei =

Yulei may refer to:

- Marilynessa yulei, snail in the family Camaenidae
- Mylothris yulei, butterfly in the family Pieridae
- Yulei Township in Wen County, Gansu, China
- Yulei (deity) or Yulü, Chinese guardian deity
- Yu Lei (politician), a Chinese politician and public security official.

== See also ==
- Zhuzi yulei, Chinese text containing discussions between Zhu Xi and his disciples
