= Stephen Wootton Bushell =

English physician (1844–1908)

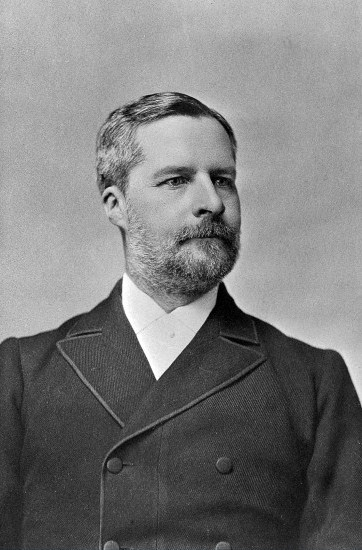
- Portrait of Stephen Wootton Bushell (c. 1880–1890)
- Born: 28 July 1844; Ash-next-Sandwich, Kent, England
- Died: 19 September 1908; Harrow on the Hill, Middlesex, England
- Citizenship: United Kingdom
- Known for: Books on Chinese art and Chinese ceramics
- Scientific career
- Fields: Medicine

Stephen Wootton Bushell CMG MD (28 July 1844 – 19 September 1908) was an English physician and amateur Orientalist who made important contributions to the study of Chinese ceramics, Chinese coins and the decipherment of the Tangut script.

== Biography ==
Bushell was born in Ash-next-Sandwich in Kent, the second son of William Bushell and Sarah Frances Bushell (née Wooton). He was educated at Tunbridge Wells School and Chigwell School. His father owned a large farm, but as the second son he needed to seek a career outside farming, and so he studied medicine at Guy's Hospital Medical School), University of London, where he excelled, winning prizes and scholarships in Organic Chemistry and Materia Medica (scholarship and gold medal, 1864), Biology (scholarship, 1865), Geology and Palaeontology (first class honours, 1865), Medicine and Midwifery (first class honours, 1866), and Forensic Medicine (gold medal, 1866). After graduation in 1866, he worked as a house surgeon at Guy's Hospital, and then in 1867 he worked as a resident medical officer at Bethlem Royal Hospital. He was awarded the degree of Doctor of Medicine (MD) from the University of London on 13 May 1868.

In January 1868, at the recommendation of Dr William Lockhart, Bushell was offered a position as physician to the British Legation in Beijing, China, with an annual salary of £600 and the promise that he could also engage in private practice at Beijing if he wished. He set sail for Shanghai on the last day of the next month, and except for a few periods of leave, he remained there for the next thirty-two years. On his first return to England, in 1874, he was married to Florence Jane Mathews (1853-1930), the daughter of a doctor from Bickley in Kent, and they returned to China together the next year.

Whilst in China he learned to read and speak Chinese, and published a number of articles on the art, numismatics, geography and history of China. He finally retired and returned to England in 1900, due to ill-health. After returning to England he published a number of books on Chinese porcelain and other subjects.

In 1897 he was made a Companion of the Order of St Michael and St George.

== Travels in China ==
In autumn 1872, Bushell and Thomas G. Grosvenor (1842–1886), a secretary at the British Legation, went on a journey beyond the Great Wall of China to Inner Mongolia, and visited the ruins of Shangdu (Samuel Taylor Coleridge's Xanadu), the fabled summer capital of the Yuan dynasty. They were the first Europeans to visit Shangdu since the time of Marco Polo.

== Study of ancient scripts ==
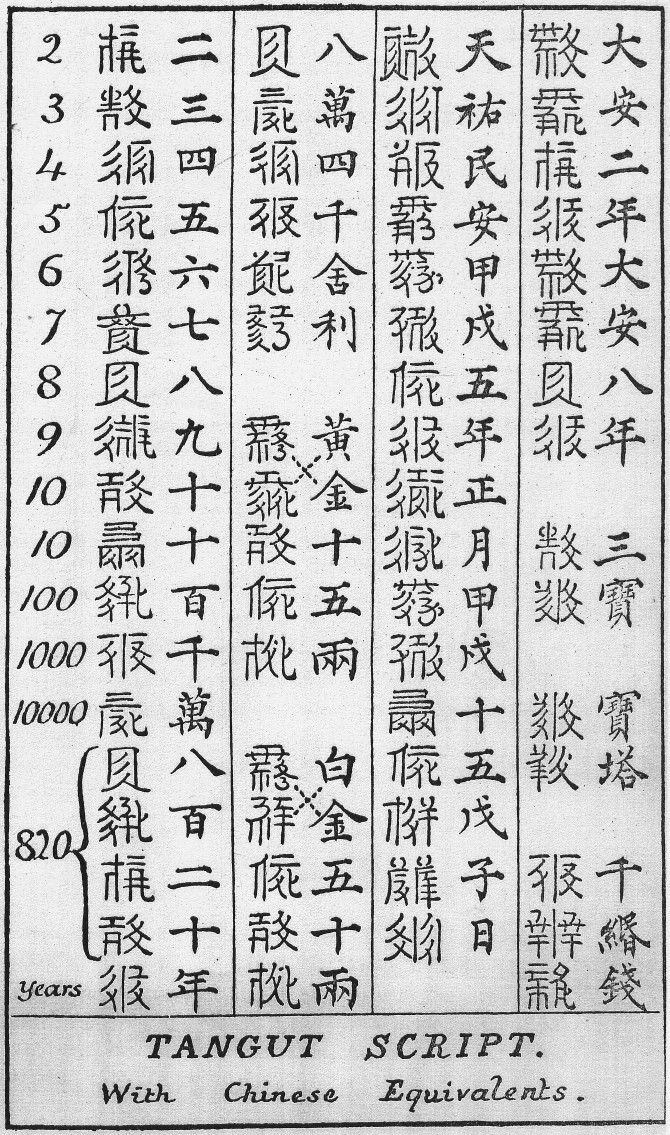
Bushell's decipherement of 37 Tangut characters

Bushell made important contributions to the study of the extinct Tangut, Khitan large, Khitan small, Jurchen and 'Phags-pa scripts.

=== Tangut ===
One of Bushell's many interests was numismatics, and he collected a number of coins issued by the Western Xia state with inscriptions in the Tangut script. To read the inscriptions on these coins he attempted to decipher as many Tangut characters as possible by comparing the Chinese and Tangut texts on a bilingual stele from Liangzhou. Using this methodology, in 1896 he was able to determine the meaning of thirty-seven Tangut characters (see adjacent image), and could thereby identify the inscription on one of his Western Xia coins as corresponding to the Chinese Dà'ān Bǎoqián 大安寶錢 (Precious Coin of the Da'an period, 1076–1085). Although Bushell did not try to reconstruct the pronunciation of any of the Tangut characters, he was the first scholar to be able to decipher the meaning of any Tangut characters.

Bushell was also able to confirm that the unknown script on the six-script inscription on the Cloud Platform at Juyongguan on the Great Wall of China was Tangut, and not Jurchen, as had been asserted by several previous authors, in particular Alexander Wylie in an 1870 paper entitled "An ancient Buddhist inscription at Keu-yung Kwan".

=== Jurchen ===
Bushell discussed the Jurchen script in an article he published in 1897 entitled "Inscriptions in the Juchen and Allied Scripts". In this article he analyses in detail the Jurchen inscription on a stele from Kaifeng that has a list of "metropolitan graduates" (the stele is thus known as the Jinshi Bei 進士碑 'Metropolitan Graduates Stele').

=== Khitan ===
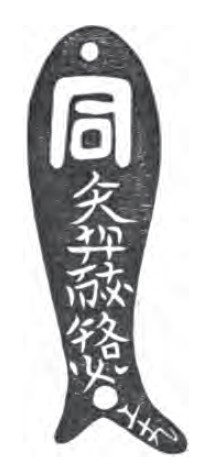
Bronze 'fish tally' with small Khitan inscription reading "Commander of the Heaven Cloud Army" owned by Bushell

Bushell discussed the Khitan small character and large character scripts in his article on the Jurchen script published in 1897, but did not attempt any decipherment or engage in detailed study of the two scripts. However he did publish a facsimile of a bronze 'fish tally' (yú fú 魚符) with a small character Khitan inscription that he had in his collection. Although he misidentified the script on the tally as "large Jurchen", the tally is an important example of the small Khitan script.

=== 'Phags-pa ===
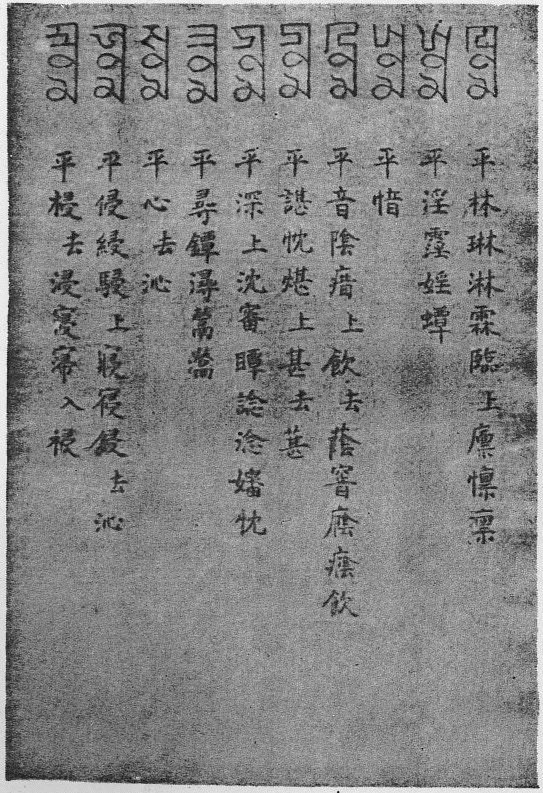
Page from the Chinese 'Phags-pa rhyming dictionary manuscript owned by Bushell

Although he did not actually publish anything relating to the 'Phags-pa script, during his time in China (probably on his 1872 trip to Inner Mongolia) he acquired the only extant manuscript copy of the early 14th century rhyming dictionary of Chinese written in the 'Phags-pa script (Menggu Ziyun 蒙古字韻), which was sold to the British Museum by his widow in April 1909. This is the only surviving example of a dictionary written in the 'Phags-pa script, and is the single most important source for studying how Chinese was written in the 'Phags-pa script during the Yuan dynasty. This manuscript is now held at the British Library (callmark Or. 6972).

== Study of Chinese art and ceramics ==
Bushell is best known for his books on Chinese art, and, in particular, Chinese porcelain. In 1883 he was appointed by the Victoria and Albert Museum in London to purchase Chinese porcelain on their behalf, and he acquired a total of 233 pieces for the museum. He also acquired a number of items for the British Museum, including a Tibetan skull cup in 1887 and collection of bronzes in 1898.

Shortly before his retirement, and in the years following his return to England in 1900, he produced a number of important books on Chinese art, including two handbooks for the Victoria and Albert Museum, Oriental Ceramic Art (1897) and Chinese Art (1904), and a catalogue of the Morgan Collection of Chinese porcelains (1907), which at that time was on display at the Metropolitan Museum in New York. He also worked with Dr. George F. Kunz and Heber R. Bishop in writing producing the catalog of the Bishop Collection of Jade at the Metropolitan Museum of Art in 1906. His final work was a book about 16th-century Chinese porcelain with 83 coloured plates, incorporating a manuscript text in Chinese by Xiang Yuanbian 項元汴 (1525–1590), a wealthy art collector from Jiaxing in Zhejiang province, with a translation into English by Bushell. The final proof copy of this book was delivered to his home just a few hours after Bushell's death.

After his death, his widow donated his collection of ceramics, antique pottery sherds, ancient Chinese knife and spade coins, hanging scrolls, and various other artefacts to the British Museum.

== Study of Numismatics ==
Bushell also made important contributions to the study of East Asian numismatics. He was a member of the Royal Numismatic Society, collected coins, and wrote papers about Chinese numismatics - see the list of the publications below. After his death, his widow donated his Chinese coins to the British Museum.

== Works ==
- 1872. "Roman and Chinese Coinage" (illustrated), The China Review, Vol.1 No.2 (1872).
- 1873. "Chinese Cash", The China Review, Vol.1 No.6 (1873).
- 1874. "The Stone Drums of the Chou Dynasty"; Journal of the North China Branch of the Royal Asiatic Society Vol.VIII.
- 1875. "Notes of a Journey Outside the Great Wall of China: Read before the Royal Geographical Society of London, February 9th, 1874"; Journal of the Royal Geographical Society Vol. XLIV: 73–115.
- 1875. "Notes on the Old Mongolian Capital of Shangtu"; Journal of the Royal Asiatic Society of Great Britain and Ireland Vol. VII: 329–338.
- 1877. "A rare Manchu coin"; The China Review Vol.6 No.2 (1877) 143-144.
- 1878. "The Chinese Silver Coinage of Tibet", The China Review, Vol.6 No.5 (1878).
- 1878. "A Chinese Coin", The China Review, Vol.7 No.1 (1878).
- 1879. "A Terra-cotta Vase with supposed Chinese Inscription discovered by Dr. Schliemann, at Hissarlik" (with illustrations), The China Review, Vol.8 No.1 (1879).
- 1880. "Coins of the present day Dynasty of China"; Journal of the North China Branch of the Royal Asiatic Society Vol.XV: 195–310.
- 1880. "Early history of Tibet from Chinese sources"; Journal of the Royal Asiatic Society of Great Britain and Ireland Vol. XII: 435–541.
- 1880. "The Chinese Silver Coinage of Tibet", The China Review, Vol.8 No.6 (1880).
- 1883. "A New Mint in Chinese Turkestan", The China Review, Vol.11 No.4 (1883).
- 1883. "Mongol Mark on Porcelain", The China Review, Vol.11 No.5 (1883).
- 1884. "A New Silver Coinage for Chinese Turkestan", The China Review, Vol.13 No.2 (1884).
- 1889. Specimens of ancient Chinese paper money. Peit'ang Press.
- 1892. "A Rare Canton Coinage", The China Review, Vol.20 No.1 (1892).
- 1895–1896. "The Hsi Hsia Dynasty of Tangut, their Money and Peculiar Script"; Journal of the North China Branch of the Royal Asiatic Society Vol.XXX: 142–160.
- 1897. "Inscriptions in the Juchen and Allied Scripts"; Actes du Onzième Congrès International des Orientalistes 2nd section pages 11–35. Paris.
- 1899. "The Tangut script in the Nan K'ou Pass"; The China Review] Vol.24 No.2 (Oct. 1899): 65–68.
- 1904. "Notes on the decorative and architectural use of glazed tiles and faience in China"; in W.J. Furnival, Leadless Decorative Tiles, Faience, and Mosaic. Stone, Staffordshire.
- 1904–1906. Chinese Art. London: H. M. Stationery Office.
- 1905. "Chinese Architecture"; in Smithsonian Institution Annual Report, 1904 pages 677–690. Washington: Smithsonian Institution.
- 1906. Bishop Collection, by Heber R. Bishop, George Frederick Kunz, Stephen W. Bushell, Robert Lilley, and Tadamasa Hayashi. The Bishop Collection. Investigations and Studies in Jade. New York: Privately Printed. [The De Vinne Press], 1906. OCLC: 14097767; 651197967.
- 1907 Catalogue of the Morgan Collection of Chinese Porcelains
- 1908. Chinese Porcelain. Oxford: Clarendon Press.

With William Thompson Walters and William M. Laffan

- 1897. Oriental Ceramic Art. New York: D. Appleton and company.

With William M. Laffan

- 1907. Catalogue of the Morgan collection of Chinese porcelains. New York: Metropolitan Museum of Art.
