= Old Mandarin =

Form of Chinese spoken in northern China between the 12th and 14th centuries

- Early Mandarin
- 漢兒言語 Hàn'ér yányǔ
- Region: North China Plain
- Era: 12th to 14th centuries
- Language family: Sino-Tibetan: Sinitic; Chinese; Mandarin; Old Mandarin
- Early forms: Old Chinese: Middle Chinese
- Writing system: Chinese characters, ʼPhags-pa script

Language codes
- ISO 639-3: –
- Glottolog: None

Chinese name
- Traditional Chinese: 古官話
- Simplified Chinese: 古官话
Transcriptions
Standard Mandarin
- Hanyu Pinyin: Gǔ Guānhuà

Early Mandarin
- Traditional Chinese: 早期官話
- Simplified Chinese: 早期官话
Transcriptions
Standard Mandarin
- Hanyu Pinyin: Zǎoqí Guānhuà

Old Mandarin or Early Mandarin was the speech of northern China during the Jurchen-ruled Jin dynasty and the Mongol-led Yuan dynasty (12th to 14th centuries). New genres of vernacular literature were based on this language, including verse, drama and story forms, such as the qu and sanqu.

The phonology of Old Mandarin has been inferred from the ʼPhags-pa script, an alphabet created in 1269 for several languages of the Mongol empire, including Chinese, and from two rime dictionaries, the Menggu Ziyun (1308) and the Zhongyuan Yinyun (1324). The rhyme books differ in some details but show many of the features characteristic of modern Mandarin dialects, such as the reduction and disappearance of final stops and the reorganization of the four tones of Middle Chinese.

== Name ==
The name "Mandarin", as a direct translation of the Chinese Guānhuà (官話, 'language of the officials'), was initially applied to the lingua franca of the Ming and Qing dynasties, which was based on various northern dialects. It has since been extended to both Standard Chinese and related northern dialects from the 12th century to the present.

The language was called Hàn'ér yányǔ (漢兒言語, 'Hàn'ér language') in the Korean Chinese-language textbook Nogŏltae, after the name Hàn'ér or Hànrén used by the Mongols for their subjects in the northern area formerly ruled by the Jin, in contrast to Nánrén for those formerly under the Southern Song dynasty.

== Sources ==
China had a strong and conservative tradition of phonological description in the rime dictionaries and their elaboration in rime tables. For example, the phonological system of the 11th-century Guangyun was almost identical to that of the Qieyun of more than four centuries earlier, disguising changes in speech over the period.

=== Song period ===
China in 1111

A rare departure from the Qieyun tradition was Shao Yong's 11th-century combination of numerological methods with the categories of the Yunjing to create a tabular presentation of the phonology of contemporary speech. Most scholars believe that his tables reflect the speech of the Northern Song capital Kaifeng. However, Sergei Yakhontov argued that it represented the pronunciation of Shao's ancestral home of Fanyang (Beijing), on the basis of similarities to the sound system of the 14th-century Zhongyuan yinyun.

During the Northern Song period, parts of northern China were ruled by the Khitan (the Liao dynasty) in the northeast and the Tangut (the Western Xia) in the northwest. They spoke non-Chinese languages, but their texts contain Chinese proper nouns and loanwords, giving information about the sounds of contemporary Northern Chinese. The Khitan small script is only partially deciphered, but is believed to be phonetic. About a third of the graphs, most of them used for Chinese words, have been assigned approximate phonetic values. Jurchen texts also contain Chinese words, but the principal material is the Jurchen section of the Huayi yiyu compiled in the much later Ming dynasty.

=== Yuan period ===
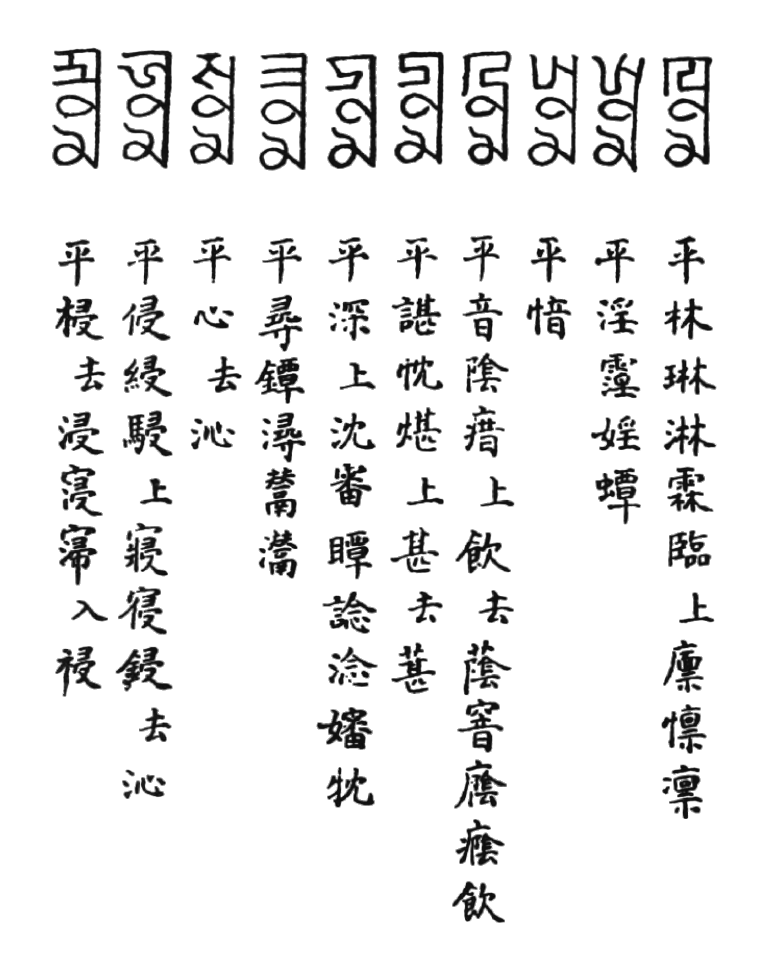
A page of the Menggu Ziyun (1308) covering the syllables tsim to lim (written in 'Phags-pa script at the top)

A side-effect of foreign rule of northern China between the 12th and 14th centuries was a weakening of many of the old traditions. New genres of vernacular literature included qu and sanqu poetry, which were rhymed according to contemporary vernacular pronunciation instead of the codified rules of formal poetry. Descriptive works less bound by the Qieyun tradition revealed how much the language had changed.

The first alphabetic writing system for Chinese was created by the Tibetan Buddhist monk and Sakya school leader Drogön Chögyal Phagpa on the orders of the Mongol emperor Kublai Khan. His ʼPhags-pa script, promulgated in 1269, was a vertical adaptation of the Tibetan alphabet initially aimed at Mongolian but later adapted to other languages of the empire, including Chinese. It saw limited use until the fall of the Yuan dynasty in 1368. The alphabet shows some influence of traditional phonology, in particular including voiced stops and fricatives that most scholars believe had disappeared from Mandarin dialects by that time. However, checked tone syllables (ending in the stops /p/, /t/ or /k/ in Middle Chinese) were all written with a glottal stop ending. (Other tones are not marked by the script.)

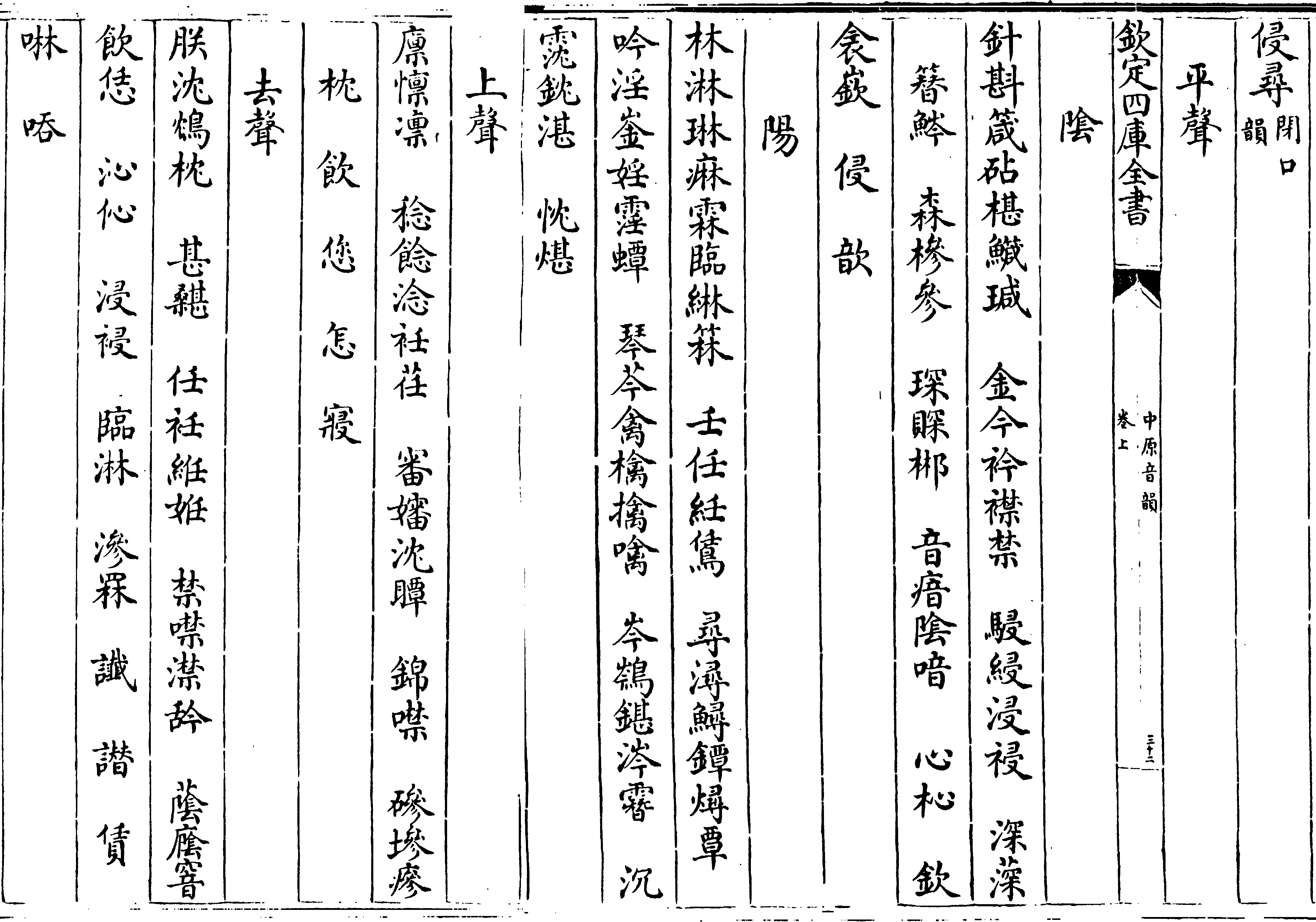
Zhongyuan Yinyun (1324) rhyme group 侵尋 (-im, -əm), divided into four tones

The Menggu Ziyun was a rime dictionary based on ʼPhags-pa script. The prefaces of the only extant manuscript are dated 1308, but the work is believed to be derived from earlier ʼPhags-pa texts. The dictionary is believed to be based on Song dynasty rime dictionaries, particularly the Lǐbù yùnlüè (禮部韻略, 'Rimes of the Ministry of Rites') issued by the Ministry of Rites in 1037. The front matter includes a list of 'Phags-pa letters mapped to the 36 initials of the Song dynasty rime table tradition, with further letters for vowels. The entries are grouped into 15 rime classes corresponding closely to the 16 broad rime classes of the tables. Within each rime class, entries are grouped by the 'Phags-pa spelling of the final and then by the four tones of Middle Chinese, the last of which is not indicated by the ʼPhags-pa spelling.

A more radical departure from the rhyme table tradition was the Zhongyuan Yinyun, created by Zhōu Déqīng (周德清) in 1324 as a guide to the rhyming conventions of qu, a new vernacular verse form. The entries are grouped into 19 rhyme classes each identified by a pair of exemplary characters. The rhyme classes are subdivided by tone and then into groups of homophones, with no other indication of pronunciation. The even tone (平 píng) is divided in upper and lower tones called 陰平 yīnpíng and 陽平 yángpíng, respectively. Syllables in the checked tone are distributed between the other tones, but placed after the other syllables with labels such as 入聲作去聲 (rùshēng zuò qùshēng, 'entering tone makes departing tone').

Sources for Early Mandarin vocabulary and syntax include Zhuzi yulei (c.1270) and the Korean Chinese-language textbook Nogŏltae (late 14th century).

== Phonology ==
The phonology of Old Mandarin is most clearly defined in the Zhongyuan Yinyun. The 'Phags-pa script and the Menggu Ziyun tend to retain more traditional elements, but are useful in filling in the spartan description of the Zhongyuan Yinyun. The language shows many of the features characteristic of modern Mandarin dialects, such as the reduction and disappearance of final stop consonants and the reorganization of the Middle Chinese tones.

=== Initials ===
In Middle Chinese, initial stops and affricates showed a three-way contrast between voiceless unaspirated, voiceless aspirated and voiced consonants. The voicing distinction disappeared in most Chinese varieties, with different effects on the initials and tones in each of the major groups. In Old Mandarin, Middle Chinese voiced stops and affricates became voiceless aspirates in the "even" tone and voiceless non-aspirates in others, a typical feature of modern Mandarin varieties. This distribution is also found in Shao Yong's 11th-century rhyme tables. This devoicing pattern is also found in the Khitan materials. Contemporaneous materials from the Western Xia show a different pattern, in which Middle Chinese voiced stops always become voiceless aspirated stops, as in modern Gan and Hakka varieties.

With the exception of the retroflex nasal, which merged with the dental nasal, the Late Middle Chinese retroflex stops and retroflex sibilants merged into a single series.

Initials of the Zhongyuan Yinyun
		Labial	Dental	Sibilant	Retroflex	Velar
Stop or affricate	voiceless	p-	t-	ts-	tʂ-	k-
Stop or affricate	aspirate	pʰ-	tʰ-	tsʰ-	tʂʰ-	kʰ-
Nasal		m-	n-			ŋ-
Fricative		f-		s-	ʂ-	x-
Approximant		ʋ-	l-		ɻ-	∅-

The initial /∅/ denotes a voiced laryngeal onset functioning as a zero initial. It was almost in complementary distribution with the initial /ŋ/, and the two have merged in most modern dialects as a zero initial, [ŋ], [ɣ] or [n]. The initial /ʋ/ has also merged with the zero initial and the /w/ medial in the standard language.

The distinction between the dental and retroflex sibilants has persisted in northern Mandarin dialects, including that of Beijing, but the two series have merged in southwestern and southeastern dialects. A more recent development in some dialects (including Beijing) is the merger of palatal allophones of dental sibilants and velars, yielding a palatal series (rendered j-, q- and x- in pinyin).

=== Finals ===
The Late Middle Chinese rime tables divide finals between 16 rhyme classes (shè 攝), each described as either "inner" (nèi 內) or "outer" (wài 外), thought to indicate a close or open vowel respectively. Each rhyme group was divided into four "divisions" (děng 等), crosscut with a two-way division between "open mouth" (kāikǒu 開口) or "closed mouth" (hékǒu 合口), with the latter indicating labialisation of the syllable onset.

Although these categories are coarser than the finals of the Early Middle Chinese of the Qieyun, they are sufficient to account for the development to Old Mandarin. The LMC divisions are reflected in Old Mandarin by variation in the vowel, as well as the presence or absence of palatalization. Palatalization and lip rounding are represented by a medial glide, as in modern varieties. Divisions III and IV are not distinguished by any of the varieties, and are marked with a palatal glide, except after retroflex initials. Palatal glides also occur in open division II syllables with velar or laryngeal initials.

For example, the rhyme classes with nasal codas yield the following Old Mandarin finals:

Old Mandarin reflexes of Late Middle Chinese rhymes with nasal codas
Rhyme class	Open					Closed			
Rhyme class	Div. I	Div. II		Div. III	Div. IV	Div. I	Div. II	Div. III	Div. IV
深 shēn				-əm, -im (Note: -əm occurs only after retroflex initials.)					
咸 xián	-am		-jam (Note: -jam occurs only in syllables with Middle Chinese velar and laryngeal initials.)	-jɛm					
臻 zhēn	-ən			-in		-un		-yn	
山 shān	-an		-jan (Note: -jan occurs only in syllables with Middle Chinese velar and laryngeal initials.)	-jɛn		-wɔn	-wan	-ɥɛn	
通 tōng						-uŋ		-juŋ	
曾 zēng	-əŋ			-iŋ		-wəŋ		-yŋ	
梗 gěng		-əŋ		-iŋ			-wəŋ	-yŋ	
宕 dàng	-aŋ			-jaŋ		-waŋ		-waŋ	
江 jiāng		-aŋ	-jaŋ (Note: -jaŋ occurs only in syllables with Middle Chinese velar and laryngeal initials.)						

The merger of the zēng and gěng rhyme classes is a characteristic feature of Mandarin dialects. That merger, and that of the dàng and jiāng classes, was already reflected in Shao Yong's 11th-century rhyme tables.

Middle Chinese stop codas were lost in Old Mandarin. This is prefigured in Shao Yong's tables, where finals with Middle Chinese -t and -k are treated as the departing tone counterparts of open finals, though -p is grouped with -m. The Khitan materials also treat these syllables as open. The codas -p and -t generally disappeared with no effect on the vowel. The coda -k also generally disappeared in the tōng rhyme. It yielded -j in the merged zēng and gěng rhymes. In the merged dàng and jiāng rhymes, it yielded -w. This diphthongization is also reflected in Shao Yong's tables and the Khitan materials.

The two sources yield very similar sets of finals, though they sometimes differ in which finals were considered to rhyme:

Finals of the Zhongyuan Yinyun and Menggu Ziyun
Zhongyuan Yinyun rhyme class		Finals by medial class				Menggu Ziyun rhyme class	
Zhongyuan Yinyun rhyme class		開口	齊齒	合口	撮口	Menggu Ziyun rhyme class	
Zhongyuan Yinyun rhyme class		-	-j-	-w-	-ɥ-	Menggu Ziyun rhyme class	
5	魚模 yú-mú			-u	-y	5	魚 yú
12	哥戈 gē-hū	-ɔ	-jɔ (Note: This final occurs in the Zhongyuan Yinyun but not in 'Phags-pa.)	-wɔ		14	哥 gē
14	車遮 chē-zhē		-jɛ (Note: Palatalization was lost after retroflex initials, so -jɛ and -ɥɛ become -ɛ and -wɛ after retroflex initials.)		-ɥɛ	15	痲 má
13	家痲 jiā-má	-a	-ja	-wa		15	痲 má
3	支思 zhī-sī	-z̩, -r̩ (Note: z̩ following dental sibilants, r̩ following retroflex sibilants)				4	支 zhī
4	齊微 qí-wēi		-i	-uj		4	支 zhī
4	齊微 qí-wēi	-əj				6	佳 jiā
6	皆來 jiē-lái	-aj	-jaj	-waj		6	佳 jiā
16	尤侯 yóu-hóu	-əw	-iw			11	尤 yóu
11	蕭豪 xiāo-háo (Note: The additional vowels in this rhyme group may reflect contrasts in Zhou Deqing's speech that were no longer distinguished in rhyming practice.)		-jɛw	-wɔw		10	蕭 xiāo
11	蕭豪 xiāo-háo	-aw	-jaw	-waw		10	蕭 xiāo
17	侵尋 qīn-xún	-əm	-im			13	侵 qīn
19	廉纖 lián-xiān		-jɛm			12	覃 tán
18	監咸 yán-xián	-am	-jam			12	覃 tán
7	真文 zhēn-wén	-ən	-in	-un	-yn	7	真 zhēn
10	先天 xiān-tiān		-jɛn		-ɥɛn	9	先 xiān
9	桓歡 huán-huān			-wɔn		8	寒 hán
8	寒山 hán-shān	-an	-jan	-wan		8	寒 hán
1	東鐘 dōng-zhōng			-uŋ	-juŋ	1	東 dōng
15	庚青 gēng-qīng	-əŋ	-iŋ	-wəŋ	-yŋ	2	庚 gēng
2	江陽 jiāng-yáng	-aŋ	-jaŋ	-waŋ		3	陽 yáng

In syllables with labial initials, Middle Chinese -m codas had already dissimilated to -n before the Old Mandarin period. The remaining -m codas merged with -n before the early 17th century, when the late Ming standard was described by European missionaries Matteo Ricci and Nicolas Trigault. The pairs -uŋ/-wəŋ and -juŋ/-yŋ had also merged by this time. However, the language still distinguished mid and open vowels in the pairs -jɛw/-jaw, -jɛn/-jan and -wɔn/-wan. For example, 官 and 關, both guān in the modern language, were distinguished as [kwɔn] and [kwan]. These pairs had also merged by the time of Joseph Prémare's 1730 grammar. They are still distinguished in Wu and Gan and some nearby Lower Yangtze Mandarin dialects such as the Yangzhou dialect, where they are pronounced [kuõ] and [kuɛ̃] respectively.

=== Tones ===
In Middle Chinese, syllables with vocalic or nasal codas could have one of three pitch contours, traditionally called "even", "rising" and "departing". Syllables ending in a stop consonant /p/, /t/ or /k/ (checked syllables) had no tonal contrasts but were traditionally treated as a separate "entering" tone category, parallel to syllables ending in nasals /m/, /n/, or /ŋ/. Syllables with voiced initials tended to be pronounced with a lower pitch, and by the late Tang dynasty, each of the tones had split into two registers conditioned by the initials. When voicing was lost in all dialect groups except Wu and Old Xiang, this distinction became phonemic.

The Zhongyuan Yinyun shows the typical Mandarin rearrangement of the first three tone classes into four tones:

1. the upper even tone, conditioned by Middle Chinese voiceless initials
2. the lower even tone, conditioned by Middle Chinese voiced or nasal initials
3. the rising tone (except for syllables with Middle Chinese voiced initials)
4. the departing tone, including rising tone syllables with Middle Chinese voiced initials

Checked syllables are distributed across syllables with vocalic codas in other tones determined by the Middle Chinese initial: (Note: This differs somewhat from the standard language, in which syllables with Middle Chinese voiceless initials are distributed across tones 1, 3 and 4 without pattern.)

- tone 2 in syllables with voiced obstruent initials
- tone 3 in syllables with voiceless initials except the glottal stop
- tone 4 in syllables with sonorant or glottal stop initials

Such syllables are placed after others of the same tone in the dictionary, perhaps to accommodate Old Mandarin dialects in which former checked syllables retained a final glottal stop as in modern northwestern and southeastern dialects.

== Vocabulary ==
The flourishing vernacular literature of the period also shows distinctively Mandarin vocabulary and syntax, though some, such as the third-person pronoun tā (他), can be traced back to the Tang dynasty.
