= Menggu Ziyun =

Chinese rime dictionary

- Traditional Chinese: 蒙古字韻
- Simplified Chinese: 蒙古字韵
Transcriptions
Standard Mandarin
- Hanyu Pinyin: Měnggǔ Zìyùn
- Wade–Giles: Meng-ku Tzŭ-yün

Menggu Ziyun (Chinese: 蒙古字韻; lit. 'Mongol-script rime') is a 14th-century rime dictionary of Old Mandarin Chinese as written in the 'Phags-pa script that was used during the Yuan dynasty (1271–1368). The only surviving examplar of this dictionary is an 18th-century manuscript copy that belonged to Stephen Wootton Bushell (1844–1908), and is now held at the British Library (Or. 6972). As the only known example of a 'Phags-pa script dictionary of Chinese, it is important both as an aid for interpreting Yuan dynasty texts and inscriptions written in Chinese using the 'Phags-pa script, and as a source for the reconstructed pronunciation of Old Mandarin.

== The British Library manuscript ==
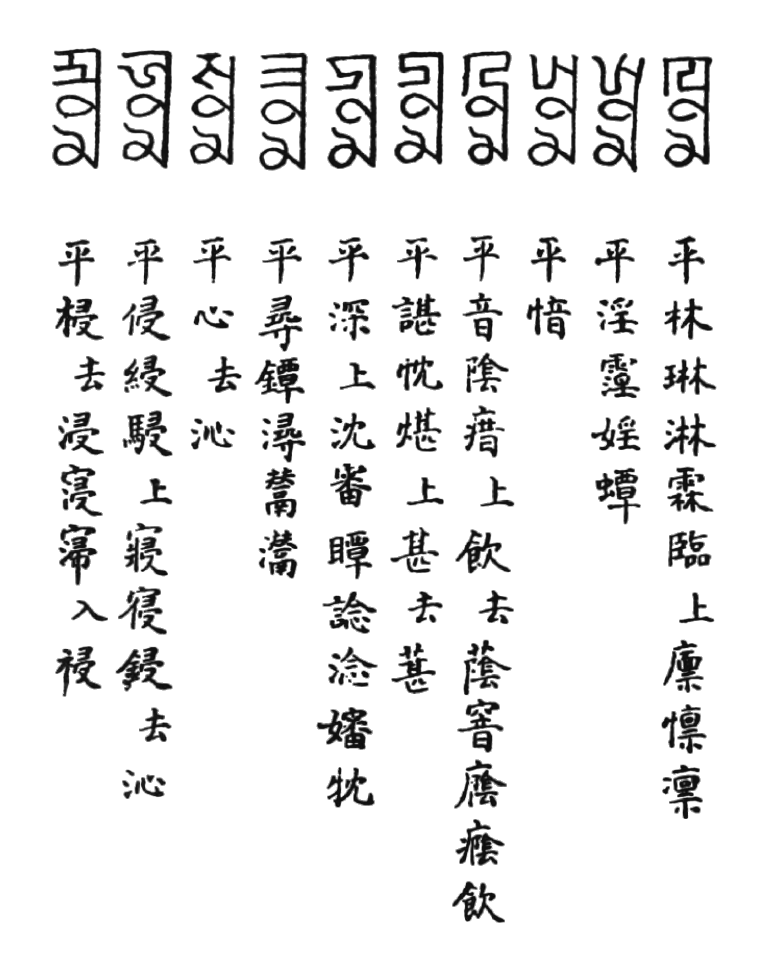
Page from Menggu Ziyun covering the syllables tsim to lim. Beneath each syllable (written in 'Phags-pa script) is a list of characters with that pronunciation, grouped by tone (平, 上, 去 and 入).

The British Library manuscript was acquired by the antiquarian and art historian S. W. Bushell when he worked as a physician at the British Legation in Beijing, China from 1868 to 1900, probably in 1872 during a trip to Inner Mongolia and the ruins of Shangdu, the fabled summer capital of the Yuan emperors then known as "Xanadu" in English. In April 1909, a year after his death, Bushell's widow, Florence Bushell, sold the manuscript to the British Museum in London, and it is now held by the British Library (shelfmark Or. 6972). (Note: According to the British Museum, Florence Bushell donated her husband's extensive collection to the British Museum in 1909, but at least this item was sold rather than donated as the inside back cover of the first volume has the inscription "Bought of Mrs. Bushell Apr. 6, 1909". "Mrs. Bushell" was misread as "Mrs. Rushell" by Luo and Cai, and so many sources (such as Ledyard 1997 and Coblin 2007) incorrectly state that the manuscript was originally owned by Mrs. Rushell.)

The manuscript is written on thin, brown paper which has been mounted on white backing paper and bound in two traditional stitched volumes, each 24.7 × 17.3 cm. Each folio of the manuscript is 22.5 × 28.8 cm in size, folded in half as is normal in stitch-bound volumes. The text is written in vertical columns running from left to right across the page, which is the opposite of traditional Chinese books, but follows the layout of Mongolian script and 'Phags-pa texts. The first volume comprises an unnumbered title folio and 33 numbered folios, and the second volume comprises an unnumbered title folio and 31 numbered folios, of which page 30b and 31a are blank except for the volume and page numbers. The missing section covers the rimes in -a and -e, as well as the first part of the appended Taboo Characters section, which Junast and Yang Naisi have calculated should actually take up three full folios (i.e. the second volume of the original edition would have comprised 33 folios).

The manuscript does not indicate when and by whom it was copied, and there are no ownership seals. However, on the basis of tabooed characters of Qing dynasty emperors, the manuscript has been dated to the Qianlong era (1736–1795). The manuscript may be a second or third hand copy of an original Yuan dynasty edition, made by someone who did not necessarily understand the 'Phags-pa script, and so the 'Phags-pa letters are often poorly written or corrupted, and there are many transcription errors such as missing, misplaced and incorrectly written Chinese characters.

== Authorship and editions ==
Based on its format, the British Library manuscript of Menggu Ziyun is thought to be a copy of an earlier printed edition. Although no extant printed editions are known, one mid 19th century writer, Luo Yizhi 羅以智, mentions that he had seen a Yuan dynasty printed edition of the dictionary. Other Qing dynasty (1644–1912) writers mention having seen manuscript copies of the text, but the British Library manuscript is now the only known copy.

The British Library manuscript includes two prefaces in Chinese dated 1308, one by Liu Geng 劉更 and one by Zhu Zongwen 朱宗文 (Mongolian name Bayan) of Xin'an 信安 (modern Changshan County in Zhejiang). The prefaces both indicate that this edition of the dictionary was composed by Zhu Zongwen, but that it is a revised edition based on a collation of several editions that were in circulation at the time, including one edition published in Hubei and one edition published in Eastern Zhejiang. The original 'Phags-pa dictionary that is ancestral to the 1308 edition was probably compiled by imperial order soon after the 'Phags-pa script was devised in about 1269, intended for use in teaching the new script to Chinese officials.

Two late 13th century books which may be related to Menggu Ziyun are recorded in Yuan dynasty sources, one called Měnggǔ Yùnlüè 蒙古韻略 ("Summary of the Mongol Rimes") and one called Měnggǔ Yùnlèi 蒙古韻類 ("Mongol Rime Categories") that was compiled by Li Hongdao 李宏道. Although neither work is extant, it has been conjectured that they could be primary sources used by Zhu Zongwen in compiling his edition, or possibly even earlier editions of Menggu Ziyun published under a different title. A preface for Měnggǔ Yùnlèi that has survived, and it indicates that it used a system of 15 rime classes and 32 initials, which is very similar to the system used in Menggu Ziyun.

== Contents ==
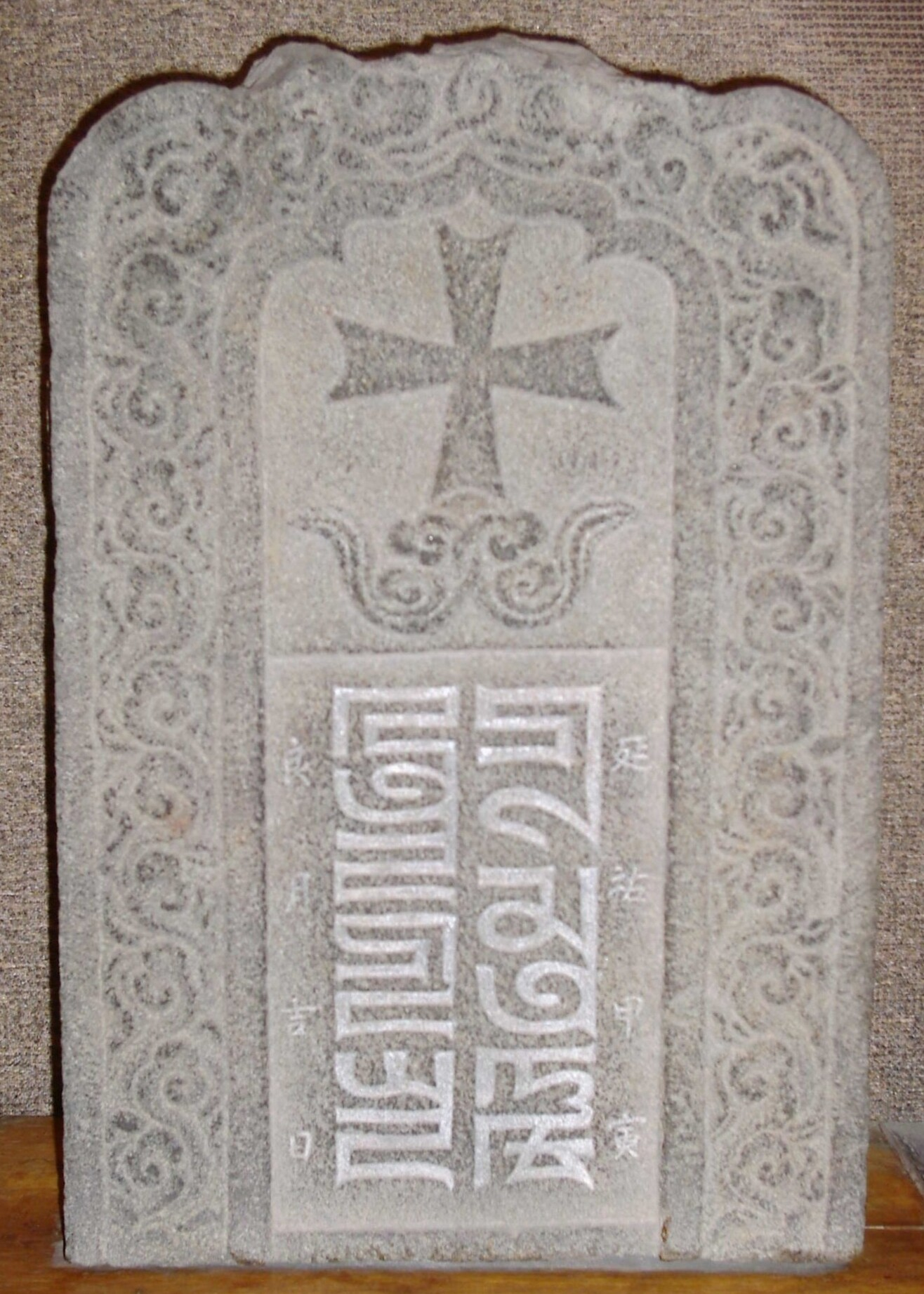
Christian tombstone of Yang Wengshe, dated 1314, from Quanzhou, China. The 'Phags-pa inscription reads ꡖꡟꡃ ꡮꡦ ꡗꡃ ꡚꡞ ꡏꡟ ꡈꡓ (-ung shee yang shi mu taw), representing Chinese weng she yang shi mu dao 翁舍楊氏墓道 "tomb memorial of Yang Wengshe".

The book is written in Chinese using a mixture of Chinese characters and 'Phags-pa transcription, with section titles and rime class headings given in both scripts. Only the two prefaces and the appended list of taboo characters are written entirely in Chinese characters. The title of the book in 'Phags-pa script (ꡏꡡꡃ
ꡣꡡꡙ
ꡐꡜꡞ
ꡝꡧꡞꡋ mong xol ts.hi ʼwin) is anomalous in that it does not exactly transcribe the corresponding Chinese characters (Měnggǔ Zìyùn 蒙古字韻) as mong xol is not a transcription of the Chinese characters 蒙古 (měnggǔ, meaning 'Mongol'), but is a direct phonetic representation of the Mongolian word ᠮᠣᠩᠭᠣᠯ mongɣol 'Mongol'.

The book comprises the following sections:

- Preface in Chinese written by Liu Geng 劉更 and dated 1308
- Preface in Chinese written by Zhu Zongwen 朱宗文 and dated 1308
- Table of errors in earlier editions of Menggu Ziyun that are corrected in this edition
- Diagram illustrating the pronunciation of 'Phags-pa letters (incomplete in the extant manuscript)
- Table of the thirty-six initial sounds of Chinese in the 'Phags-pa script
- Table of seal script forms of 'Phags-pa letters
- Table of the fifteen Chinese rime classes under which the entries are ordered
- The main text of the dictionary
- Appendix listing taboo characters, derived from the Decrees and Regulations of Yuan dynasty (元典章)

The main text comprises 813 entries ordered by rime class and initial sound. Three folios covering some 37 syllables with -a and -e rimes are missing in the extant manuscript, and so it is thought that the original text would have comprised about 850 entries in total. Each entry consists of a syllable written in 'Phags-pa script at the top, below which are a list of Chinese characters representable by this 'Phags-pa syllable, ordered according to the four traditional Chinese tones ("level", "rising", "falling" and "entering"). The 'Phags-pa script does not indicate tonal differences so Chinese characters with the same pronunciation but different tones are represented using the same 'Phags-pa syllable. A total of 9118 Chinese characters are given under the surviving 813 entries, although as Chinese characters may have more than one pronunciation, some characters are included under multiple entries.

== Phonetic features ==
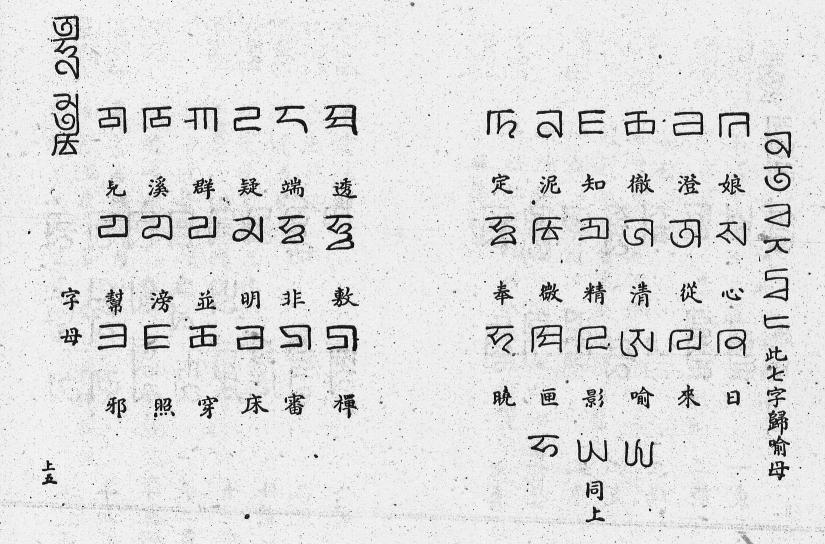
Table of 36 initials in the Menggu Ziyun

The entries in Menggu Ziyun are arranged by the fifteen rime classes listed at the start of the dictionary, and within each rime class by rime subclass (there are 71 subclasses in total, as shown in the table below). Within each rime subclass entries are ordered according to the thirty-six traditional initial onsets.

The rime classes in Menggu Ziyun follow those given in Gǔjīn Yùnhuì Jǔyào 古今韻會舉要, a lexicographical compendium originally compiled by Huang Gongshao 黃公紹 (died 1297), and published in an abridged form by Xiong Zhong 熊忠 in 1297. However, the Chinese characters under each entry may be based on Xīnkān Yùnlüè 新刊韻略, a rime book compiled by Wang Wenyu 王文郁 during the late Jin dynasty (1115–1234) (the text is known from a manuscript copy of an edition published in 1229).

15 rime classes in Menggu Ziyun
No.	Name	'Phags-pa finals
1	東 dōng	-ung, -ėung
2	庚 gēng	-ing, -hing, -yung, -ėing, -wėing, -wung, -ying
3	陽 yáng	-ang, -yang, -wang, -hang, -ong, -wėng
4	支 zhī	-i, -hi, -ėi, -ue, -yue, -wėue, -wi
5	魚 yú	-u, -ėu
6	佳 jiā	-ay, -way, -yay, -hiy, -iy
7	真 zhēn	-in, -un, -ėun, -hin, -ėin, -win
8	寒 hán	-an, -on, -wan, -yan
9	先 xiān	-en, -ėn, -wėn, -ėon, -yen
10	蕭 xiāo	-aw, -ew, -ėw, -waw, -yaw, -wėw
11	尤 yóu	-iw, -uw, -hiw, -ėiw, -ow
12	覃 tán	-am, -em, -ėm, -yam, -ėem, -yem
13	侵 qīn	-im, -him, -ėim
14	歌 gē	-o, -wo
15	麻 má	[-a, -e], -ė, -wa, -ya, -wė, -we

36 initials in Menggu Ziyun
No.	Name	Phonetic value	'Phags-pa letter	'Phags-pa Initial	Notes
1	見 jiàn	*[k]	ꡂ	g-	
2	溪 qī	*[kʰ]	ꡁ	kh-	
3	群 qún	*[ɡ]	ꡀ	k-	
4	疑 yí	*[ŋ]	ꡃ	ng-	
5	端 duān	*[t]	ꡊ	d-	
6	透 tòu	*[tʰ]	ꡉ	th-	
7	定 dìng	*[d]	ꡈ	t-	
8	泥 ní	*[n]	ꡋ	n-	
9	知 zhī	*[ʈ]	ꡆ	j-	
10	徹 chè	*[ʈʰ]	ꡅ	ch-	
11	澄 chéng	*[ɖ]	ꡄ	c-	
12	娘 niáng	*[ɳ]	ꡇ	ny-	
13	幫 bāng	*[p]	ꡎ	b-	
14	滂 pāng	*[pʰ]	ꡍ	ph-	
15	並 bìng	*[b]	ꡌ	p-	
16	明 míng	*[m]	ꡏ	m-	
17	非 fēi	*[p̪]	ꡤ	f-	Normal form of the letter fa
18	敷 fū	*[p̪ʰ]	ꡰ	f¹-	Variant form of the letter fa
19	奉 fèng	*[b̪]	ꡤ	f-	Normal form of the letter fa
20	微 wēi	*[ɱ]	ꡓ	w-	Letter wa represents [v]
21	精 jīng	*[ts]	ꡒ	dz-	
22	清 qīng	*[tsʰ]	ꡑ	tsh-	
23	從 cóng	*[dz]	ꡐ	ts-	
24	心 xīn	*[s]	ꡛ	s-	
25	邪 xié	*[z]	ꡕ	z-	
26	照 zhào	*[tɕ]	ꡆ	j-	
27	穿 chuān	*[tɕʰ]	ꡅ	ch-	
28	床 chuáng	*[dʑ]	ꡄ	c-	
29	審 shěn	*[ɕ]	ꡮ	sh¹-	Variant form of the letter sha
30	禪 chán	*[ʑ]	ꡚ	sh-	Normal form of the letter sha
31	曉 xiǎo	*[x]	ꡜ	h-	Normal form of the letter ha
32	匣 xiá	*[ɣ]	ꡣ	x-	
32	匣 xiá	*[ɣ]	ꡯ	h¹-	Variant form of the letter ha
33	影 yǐng	*[ʔ]	ꡖ	·-	glottal stop
33	影 yǐng	*[ʔ]	ꡗ	y-	Normal form of the letter ya
34	喻 yù	*[j]	ꡝ	ʼ-	null initial
34	喻 yù	*[j]	ꡭ	y¹-	Variant form of the letter ya
35	來 lái	*[l]	ꡙ	l-	
36	日 rì	*[ɲ]	ꡔ	zh-	

The 36 initials are a traditional classification of initial onsets used in Chinese books dating back to the Tang dynasty (618–907), but by the Yuan dynasty they represented an idealized phonetic system that did not accurately reflect the Old Mandarin language that the 'Phags-pa script was designed to represent. The discrepancy between the theoretical and actual phonology of Yuan dynasty Chinese is indicated by certain peculiarities in the use of 'Phags-pa letters to represent the 36 initials in Menggu Ziyun:

- The 'Phags-pa letters ja, cha and ca are each used to represent two different initials, one from the palatal series (9–11) and one from the palatal-retroflex series (26–28), suggesting that in Yuan dynasty Old Mandarin these two series had converged.
- Initials 17–19 are represented by two forms of the 'Phags-pa letter fa. Although the table of 36 initials at the head of the dictionary assigns the normal form of the letter fa to initials 17 and 19, and the variant form of the letter fa to initial 18, the actual entries in the dictionary are not consistent about which form of the letter to use for which initial. However, as no rime subclass has more than two of the three initials, only two forms of the letter fa are required to distinguish the initials from each other.
- Initials 29 (*[ɕ]) and 30 (*[ʑ]) are represented by two forms of the 'Phags-pa letter sha, and were probably pronounced the same in Yuan dynasty Old Mandarin.
- Initial 32 (*[ɣ]) is represented using both 'Phags-pa letter xa and a variant form of 'Phags-pa letter ha. However the distribution of the two letters is complementary, with the letter xa used before back vowels and i, and the variant form letter ha used before the semivowel y and front vowels other than i.
- Initial 33 (*[ʔ]) is represented using both 'Phags-pa letter ·a and the normal form of 'Phags-pa letter ya.
- Initial 34 (*[j]) is represented using both 'Phags-pa letter ʼa and a variant form of 'Phags-pa letter ya.

This use of variant forms of the letters fa, ha, sha and ya for different initials is not reflected in surviving inscriptions in the 'Phags-pa script, and is probably an attempt by Zhu Zongwen to artificially distinguish historical phonetic differences that were no longer valid in Yuan dynasty Old Mandarin.

== See also ==
- Zhongyuan Yinyun
