= Junast =

Chinese Mongol linguist (1934–2010)

- Born: May 1934; Horqin Right Middle Banner, Inner Mongolia, China
- Died: April 9, 2010 (aged 75); Beijing
- Known for: Study of Monguor language, Eastern Yugur language and the 'Phags-pa script

Academic work
- Discipline: Linguistics
- Institutions: Chinese Academy of Social Sciences; Tokyo University of Foreign Studies

Chinese name
- Traditional Chinese: 照那斯圖
- Simplified Chinese: 照那斯图
Transcriptions
Standard Mandarin
- Hanyu Pinyin: Zhàonàsītú

Mongolian name
- Mongolian Cyrillic: Зууннаст
- Mongolian script: ᠵᠠᠭᠤᠨᠨᠠᠰᠤᠲᠤ
Transcriptions
- SASM/GNC: Juun'nastu

Junast (Mongolian pronunciation: [tɕʊ́ːɴ.nəstʰ]; 1934–2010) was a Chinese Mongol linguist who specialized in the study of the Monguor language, Eastern Yugur language, and the 'Phags-pa script.

== Biography ==
Junast was born in Horqin Right Middle Banner county in Inner Mongolia in 1934. His father and grandfather were farmers, originally from Chaoyang in Liaoning. His father wanted him to have an education, so Junast was sent to a local private school from the age of eight, where he studied Chinese and Mongolian, including the Confucian classics. In 1951 he passed the entrance exam for the Hinggan Middle School in Ulan Hot, where he specialized in the Mongolian language, but in the autumn of the following year he was accepted into the newly established Mongolian Languages and Literature program at the Inner Mongolia Teachers College, despite having only been at high school for one year. In March 1953 he joined the Chinese Communist Party, and in September he was sent to study Mongolian language at Beijing University. After graduation, in 1954, he was assigned to teach at the Inner Mongolia Mongolian Specialist College (内蒙古蒙文专科学校).

In 1954 he went back to Beijing to participate in a survey of Mongolic languages, and on completion of this work he transferred to the National Minority Languages Research Institute of the Chinese Academy of Social Sciences. From 1955 to 1956 he engaged in fieldwork in Qinghai, collecting materials for the study of the Monguor language. He returned to Qinghai to study the Monguor language several more times during the 1950s and 1960s.

On the outbreak of the Cultural Revolution, Junast was labelled a "May 16 element", and suffered beatings and abuse. From 1969 to 1973 he was sent for re-education through labor at a Cadre School. It was during this period that Junast started to study the 'Phags-pa script.

From 1977 onwards, the focus of Junast's research turned to the study of documents and monuments written in the 'Phags-pa script, with his first publication on the subject being a collection of Yuan dynasty official seals carved in the convoluted "seal script" form of the 'Phags-pa script. During the 1980s he published numerous articles on the 'Phags-pa script, culminating in a critical edition of the Yuan dynasty rhyming dictionary of Chinese in the 'Phags-pa script, Menggu Ziyun.

In 1988 Junast was invited to teach in Japan, and he accepted a position as visiting professor at the Tokyo University of Foreign Studies, where he remained until the mid-2000s. In 1994 he retired from the Chinese Academy of Social Sciences, but he continued to publish articles on the 'Phags-pa script, and was engaged in research on the computerization of the 'Phags-pa script.

He died in hospital in Beijing on 9 April 2010.

== Works ==
- 1977. "Yuan Basibazi Zhuanshu Guanyin Jicun" 元八思巴字篆书官印辑存 (Collection of Yuan official seals in the 'Phags-pa seal script); Wenwu Ziliao Congkan 文物资料丛刊 16.
- 1980. "Lun Basibazi" 论八思巴字; Minzu Yuwen 民族语文 1980.1.
- 1981. "Basibazi Baijiaxing jiaokan" 八思巴字百家姓校勘. In Minzu Yuwen Lunji 民族语文论集. Beijing : Zhongguo Shehui Kexue Chubanshe.
- 1981. Dongbu Yuguyu Jianzhi 东部裕固语简志 (Introduction to the Eastern Yugur language). Beijing: Minzu Chubanshe.
- 1981. Tuzuyu Jianzhi 土族语简志 (Introduction to the Monguor language). Beijing: Minzu Chubanshe.
- 1982. "Nanhua Si cang Yuan Basibazi Mengguyu shengzhi de fuyuan yu kaoshi" 南华寺藏元八思巴字蒙古语圣旨的复原与考释.
- 1987. "Basibawen yuanyin zimu zixing wenti shang de liangzhong tixi" 八思巴文元音字母字形问题上的两种体系; Minzu Yuwen 民族语文 1987.4: 1–6.
- 1988. "Youguan Basiba zimu ė de jige wenti" 有关八思巴字母 ė 的几个问题; Minzu Yuwen 民族语文 1988.1: 1–8.
- 1989. "Basibazi zhong de ling shengmu fuhao" 八思巴字中的零声母符号; Minzu Yuwen 民族语文 1989.2: 29–36.
- 1990. 八思巴字和蒙古语文献·I研究文集 ('Phags-pa and Mongolian Documents Part 1: Research). Tokyo: Tokyo University of Foreign Studies.
- 1991. 八思巴字和蒙古语文献·II文献文集 ('Phags-pa and Mongolian Documents Part 2: Documents). Tokyo: Tokyo University of Foreign Studies.
- 2000. "Huihuwen zimu de Basibazi zhuyin" 回鹘文字母的八思巴字注音; Minzu Yuwen 民族语文 2000.4: 50–51.
- 2003. "Yizhong cong Basibazi tuotai erlai de wenzi" 一种从八思巴字脱胎而来的文字; Minzu Yuwen 民族语文 2003.1: 56–58.
- 2007 "Basibazi Mengguyu wenxian de yuyin xitong" 八思巴字蒙古语文献的语音系统 (The Mongolian Phonological System Reflected in Documents Recorded in the 'Phags-pa Script); Minzu Yuwen 民族语文 2007.2.

With Yang Naisi

- 1987. Menggu Ziyun Jiaoben 蒙古字韵校本 (A critical edition of the Mongolian Rhyming Dictionary). Beijing : Minzu Chubanshe.
