= Zhongyuan Yinyun =

1324 rime book by Zhou Deqing

Table of rimes
No.	Name	Pinyin name	Final
1	東鍾	Dōng-Zhōng	-ung
2	江陽	Jiāng-Yáng	-ang
3	支思	Zhī-Sī	-ï
4	齊微	Qí-Wēi	-i
5	魚模	Yú-Mó	-u
6	皆來	Jiē-Lái	-ai
7	真文	Zhēn-Wén	-ən
8	寒山	Hán-Shān	-an
9	桓歡	Huán-Huān	-on
10	先天	Xiān-Tiān	-en
11	蕭豪	Xiāo-Háo	-au
12	歌戈	Gē-Gē	-o
13	家麻	Jiā-Má	-a
14	車遮	Chē-Zhē	-e
15	庚清	Gēng-Qīng	-əng
16	尤侯	Yóu-Hóu	-ou
17	侵尋	Qīn-Xún	-əm
18	監鹹	Jiàn-Xián	-am
19	廉籤	Lián-Qiān	-em

Zhongyuan Yinyun (simplified Chinese: 中原音韵; traditional Chinese: 中原音韻; pinyin: Zhōngyuán Yīnyùn), literally meaning "Rhymes of the central plain", is a rime book from the Yuan dynasty compiled by Zhou Deqing (周德清) in 1324. An important work for the study of historical Chinese phonology, it testifies many phonological changes from Middle Chinese to Old Mandarin, such as the reduction and disappearance of final stop consonants and the reorganization of the Middle Chinese tones. Though often termed a "rime dictionary", the work does not provide meanings for its entries.

== Background ==
Zhongyuan Yinyun continued the tradition of Qieyun and other rime books. However, due to the phonological changes that took place from the Sui dynasty to the Yuan dynasty, the information needed to be updated in accordance with the then phonological system.

From the middle of the 13th century to the end of the 14th century, Beiqu (北曲, Northern Verse) underwent quick development. The author of Sanqu, Zhou Deqing, delved into the research on Beiqu, discovering that it created many problems by not adhering to the rules of classical poetic composition. He thought that in order to better develop Beiqu, one would need to make a definite standard, especially in respect to language. According to his own experience, he was able to propose a set of rules for composing and reciting Běiqǔ, which came to be known as Zhongyuan Yinyun.

== Structure ==
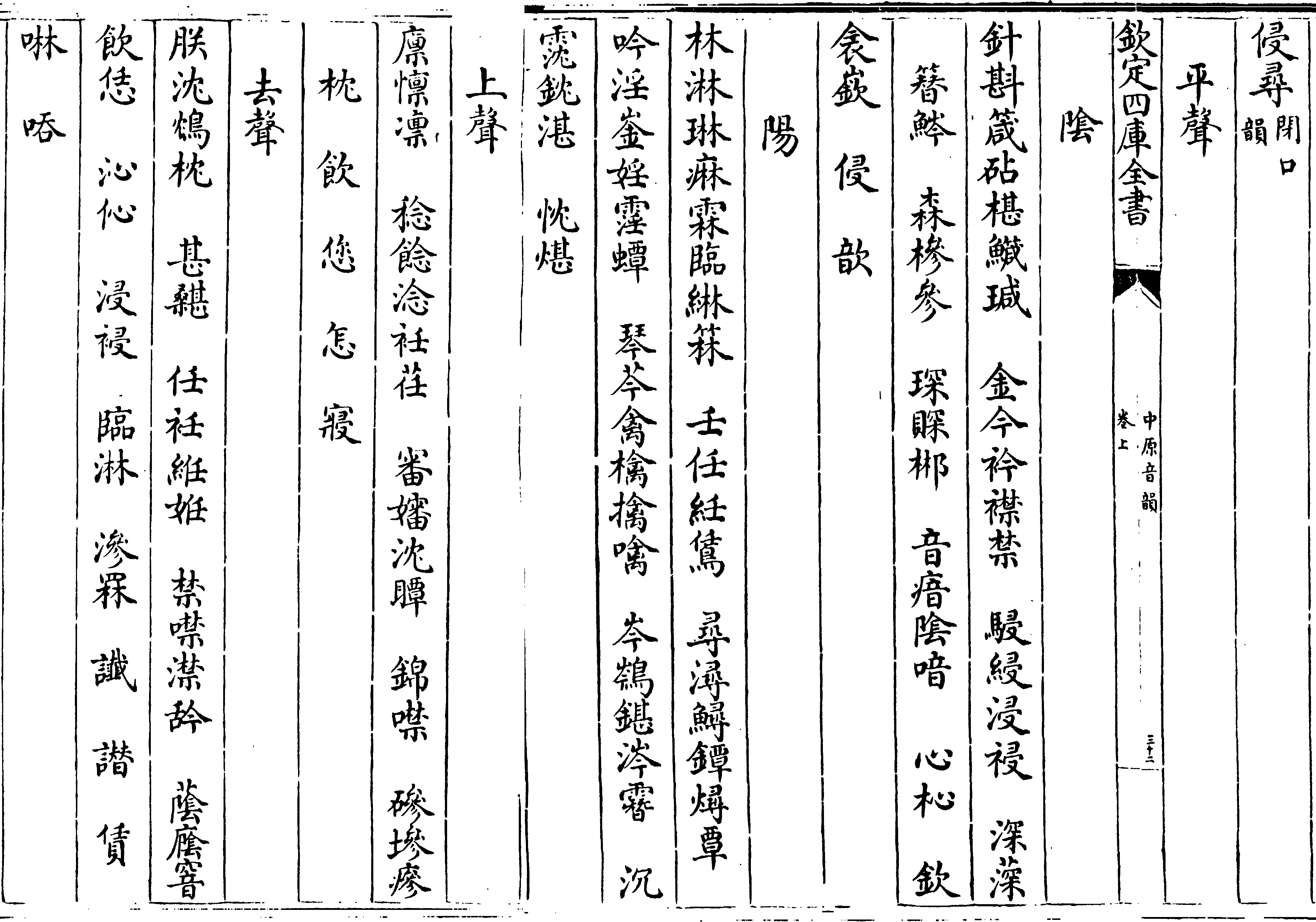
Rhyme group 侵尋 (-im, -əm), divided into four tones

In the earlier rime books, characters are first grouped by tone, then by rime. However, in Zhongyuan Yinyun, the selected 5,866 characters, commonly rhymed in songs of the time, are first grouped into 19 rime groups, then further into four tonal groups: ping sheng yin (陰平 "feminine level tone"), ping sheng yang (陽平 "masculine level tone"), shang sheng (上聲 "rising tone"), qu sheng (去聲 "departing tone"). The traditional ru sheng (入聲 "entering tone") is assigned to three groups according to contemporary rules in some modern Ji-Lu Mandarin dialects. This novel way of dividing the traditional four tones is known as "dividing the level tones into yin and yang, assigning the entering tone to the other three tones" (平分陰陽，入派三聲).

Within each rime-tonal group, homophonic characters are further grouped together, with each homophonic group separated by an empty circle. As a common character, whose pronunciation every literate person is supposed to know, is used to head each homophonic group, fanqie spelling is not employed, as in the earlier rime books, for indicating the pronunciations of the characters.

Zhou regarded the principal works of the Four Great Yuan Playwrights (元曲四大家; Yuanqu si dajia) as foundational to verse in general; he considered their works to be "rimes joined with nature, words able to connect with the language of the world" (韻共守自然之音，字能通天下之語), and at the same time also distinguished where the playwrights used rimes in non-standard places.

The second half of the Zhongyuan Yinyun, Zhèngyǔ Zuòcí Qǐlì (正語作詞起例), employs various examples to explain in detail both the rime charts' methods of use as well as issues concerning Beiqu's creation, standards and other aspects.

== Influence ==
In respect to contemporaneous and later Beiqu works, Zhongyuan Yinyun has played a very strong guiding role; moreover, many later rhyme works have regarded it as a model on which they based their interpretations. Up until the flourishing of Nanqu ("Southern Verse"), Zhongyuan Yinyun still held a tremendous influence.

== See also ==
- Menggu Ziyun
- Rime table
