= Yulei Township =

Yulei Township 玉垒乡
- Township
- Location in Gansu
- Coordinates: 32°49′41″N 105°01′37″E
- Country: People's Republic of China
- Province: Gansu
- Prefecture-level city: Longnan
- County: Wen County
- Village-level divisions: 12 villages
- Time zone: UTC+8 (China Standard)

Yulei Township (simplified Chinese: 玉垒乡; traditional Chinese: 玉壘鄉; pinyin: Yùlěi Xiāng) is a township of Wen County in southeastern Gansu province, China. As of 2023, it has 12 villages under its administration:

- Dashan Village (大山村)
- Haoping Village (蒿坪村)
- Qixinba Village (齐心坝村)
- Majiagou Village (马家沟村)
- Hejiaping Village (何家坪村)
- Xujiawan Village (徐家湾村)
- Lijiaping Village (李家坪村)
- Yujia Village (余家村)
- Yuleiping Village (玉垒坪村)
- Faziba Village (筏子坝村)
- Huangluba Village (黄路坝村)
- Ranjia Village (冉家村)

== See also ==
- List of township-level divisions of Gansu
