= Zhuzi yulei =

Medieval Chinese text

The Zhuzi yulei (Chinese: 朱子語類; lit. 'A Collection of Conversations of Master Zhu') is a medieval Chinese text containing discussions between the eminent neo-Confucian scholar Zhu Xi and his disciples, in 140 chapters. Although the text was first arranged in 1270, the version of the text available is a 19th-century reprint of a 17th-century edition of the text.

The text is particularly significant in the study of the history of Chinese, as it is believed to record a type of Early Mandarin spoken during the Southern Song dynasty. An example of a grammatical phenomenon in the book is the use of 把 bǎ and 將 jiāng in a purposive construction with 來 lái or 去 qù, a construction particular to Middle Chinese and Early Mandarin.

把 聖人 之 言 來 窮 究。
bǎ shèngrén zhī yán lái qióng jiū
take sage GEN word(s) come thorough(ly) study
'Take the words of the sage in order to study them thoroughly.' (114.2756)

== See also ==
- Zhu Xi
- Anthology of the Patriarchal Hall
- Middle Chinese
- Early Mandarin

== Bibliography ==
- Sun, Chaofen (1996). Word-Order Change and Grammaticalization in the History of Chinese. Stanford: Stanford University Press. ISBN 0804724180.
