= ʼPhags-pa script =

Mongolian writing system

ʼPhags-pa ꡏꡡꡃꡣꡡꡙꡐꡜꡞ ḥPʻags-pa
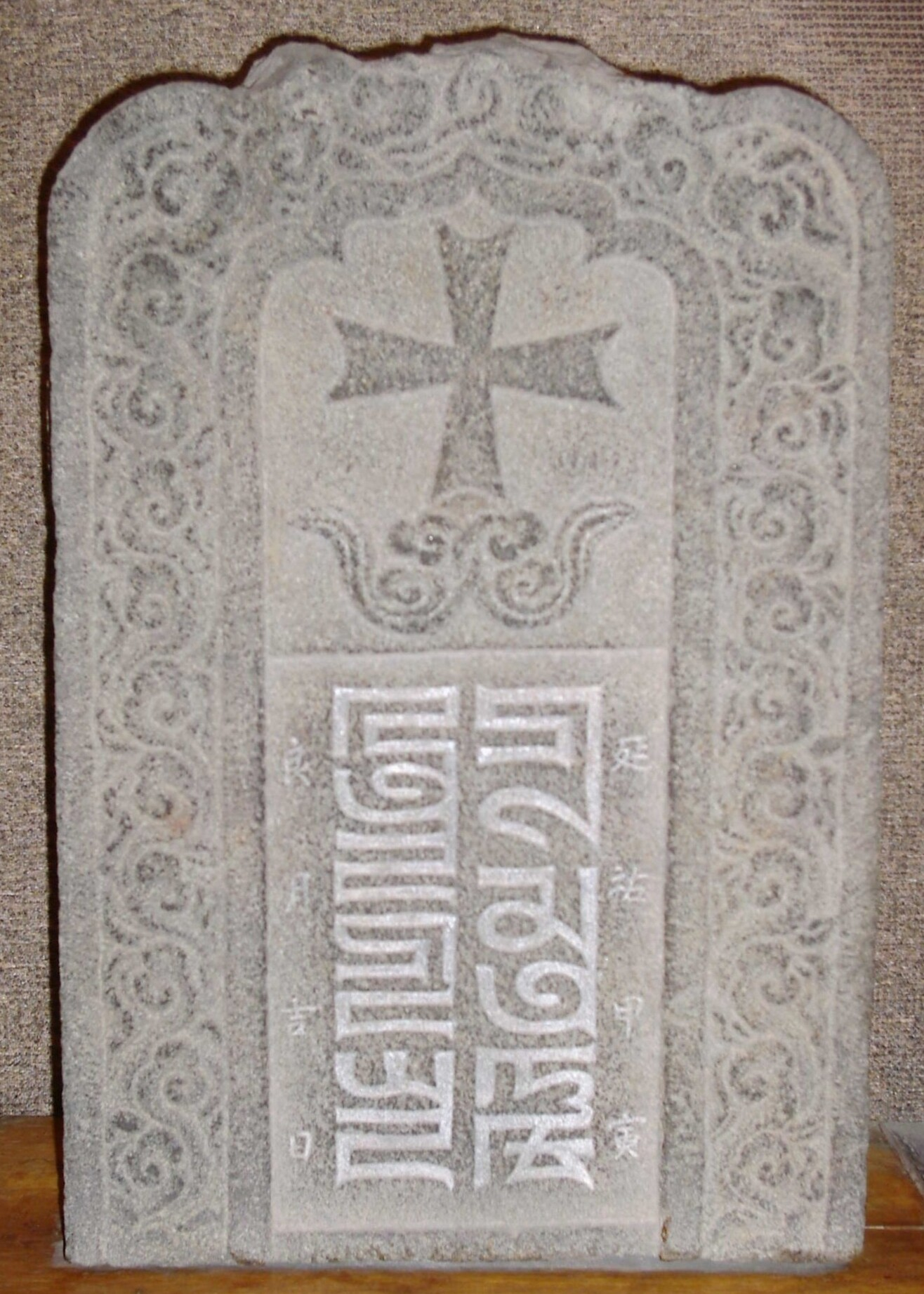
- Christian tombstone from Quanzhou dated 1314, with inscription in the ʼPhags-pa script ꡖꡟꡃ ꡚꡦ ꡗꡃ ꡚꡞ ꡏꡟ ꡈꡓ (-ung shė yang shi mu taw) 'tomb memorial of Yang Wengshe'
- Script type: Alphabet
- Creator: Drogön Chögyal Phagpa
- Period: 1269 – c. 1660
- Direction: Vertical left-to-right
- Languages: Chinese; Mongolian; Persian; Sanskrit; Tibetan; Uyghur

Related scripts
- Parent systems: Egyptian: Proto-Sinaitic; Phoenician; Aramaic; Brahmi; Gupta; Tibetan; ʼPhags-pa
- Child systems: Zanabazar's square
- Sister systems: Lepcha, Meitei, Khema, Marchen, Tamyig script

ISO 15924
- ISO 15924: Phag (331), Phags-pa

Unicode
- Unicode alias: Phags-pa
- Unicode range: U+A840–U+A87F

The Phagspa (/ˈpɑːɡzˌpɑː/ PAHGZ-PAH), ʼPhags-pa or ḥPʻags-pa script is an alphabet designed by the Tibetan monk and State Preceptor (later Imperial Preceptor) Drogön Chögyal Phagpa (1235–1280) for Kublai Khan (r. 1264–1294), the founder of the Yuan dynasty (1271–1368) in China, as a unified script for the written languages within the Yuan. The actual use of this script was limited to about a hundred years during the Mongol-led Yuan dynasty, and it fell out of use with the advent of the Ming dynasty.

The script was used to write and transcribe varieties of Chinese, the Tibetic languages, Mongolian, the Uyghur language, Sanskrit, probably Persian, and other neighboring languages during the Yuan era. For historical linguists, its use provides clues about changes in these languages.

Its descendant systems include Horizontal square script, used to write Tibetan and Sanskrit. During the Pax Mongolica the script even made numerous appearances in Western medieval art.

== Nomenclature ==
ʼPhags-pa script: ꡏꡡꡃ ꡣꡡꡙ ꡐꡜꡞ mong xol ts.hi "Mongolian script";

Mongolian: дөрвөлжин үсэг dörvöljin üseg, ᠳᠥᠷᠪᠡᠯᠵᠢᠨ
ᠦᠰᠦᠭ dörbelǰin üsüg "square script"; дөрвөлжин бичиг dörvöljin bichig, ᠳᠥᠷᠪᠡᠯᠵᠢᠨ
ᠪᠢᠴᠢᠭ dörbelǰin bičig "square writing";

Tibetan: ཧོར་ཡིག་གསར་པ་, Wylie: hor yig gsar pa "new Mongolian script";

Yuan dynasty Chinese: 蒙古新字; pinyin: měnggǔ xīnzì "new Mongolian script"; 國字; guózì' "national script";

Modern Chinese: 八思巴文; pinyin: bāsībā wén "ʼPhags-pa script"; 帕克斯巴; pàkèsībā;

In English, it is also written as ḥPʻags-pa, Phaspa, Paspa, Baschpah, and Pa-sse-pa.

== History ==
During the Mongol Empire, the Mongol rulers wanted a universal script to write down the languages of the people they subjugated. The Uyghur-based Mongolian alphabet was not a perfect fit for the Middle Mongol language, and it would have been impractical to extend it to a language with a very different phonology like Chinese. Therefore, during the Yuan dynasty (c. 1269), Kublai Khan asked the Tibetan monk ʼPhags-pa to design a new alphabet for use by the whole empire. ʼPhags-pa extended his native Tibetan alphabet to encompass Mongol and Chinese, evidently Central Plains Mandarin. The resulting 38 letters have been known by several descriptive names, such as "square script", based on their shape, but today, are primarily known as the ʼPhags-pa alphabet.

Descending from Tibetan script, it is part of the Brahmic family of scripts, which includes Devanagari and scripts used throughout Southeast Asia and Central Asia. It is unique among Brahmic scripts in that it is written from top to bottom, as how classical Chinese used to be written, and as the Mongolian alphabet or later Manchu alphabet is still written.

It did not receive wide acceptance and was not a popular script even among the elite Mongols themselves, although it was used as an official script of the Yuan dynasty until the early 1350s, when the Red Turban Rebellion started. After this, it was mainly used as a phonetic gloss for Mongols learning Chinese characters. In the 20th century, it was also used as one of the scripts on Tibetan currency, as a script for Tibetan seal inscriptions from the Middle Ages up to the 20th century, and for inscriptions on the entrance doors of Tibetan monasteries.

== Syllable formation ==
Although it is an alphabet, ʼPhags-pa is written like a syllabary or abugida, with letters forming a single syllable glued or 'ligated' together.

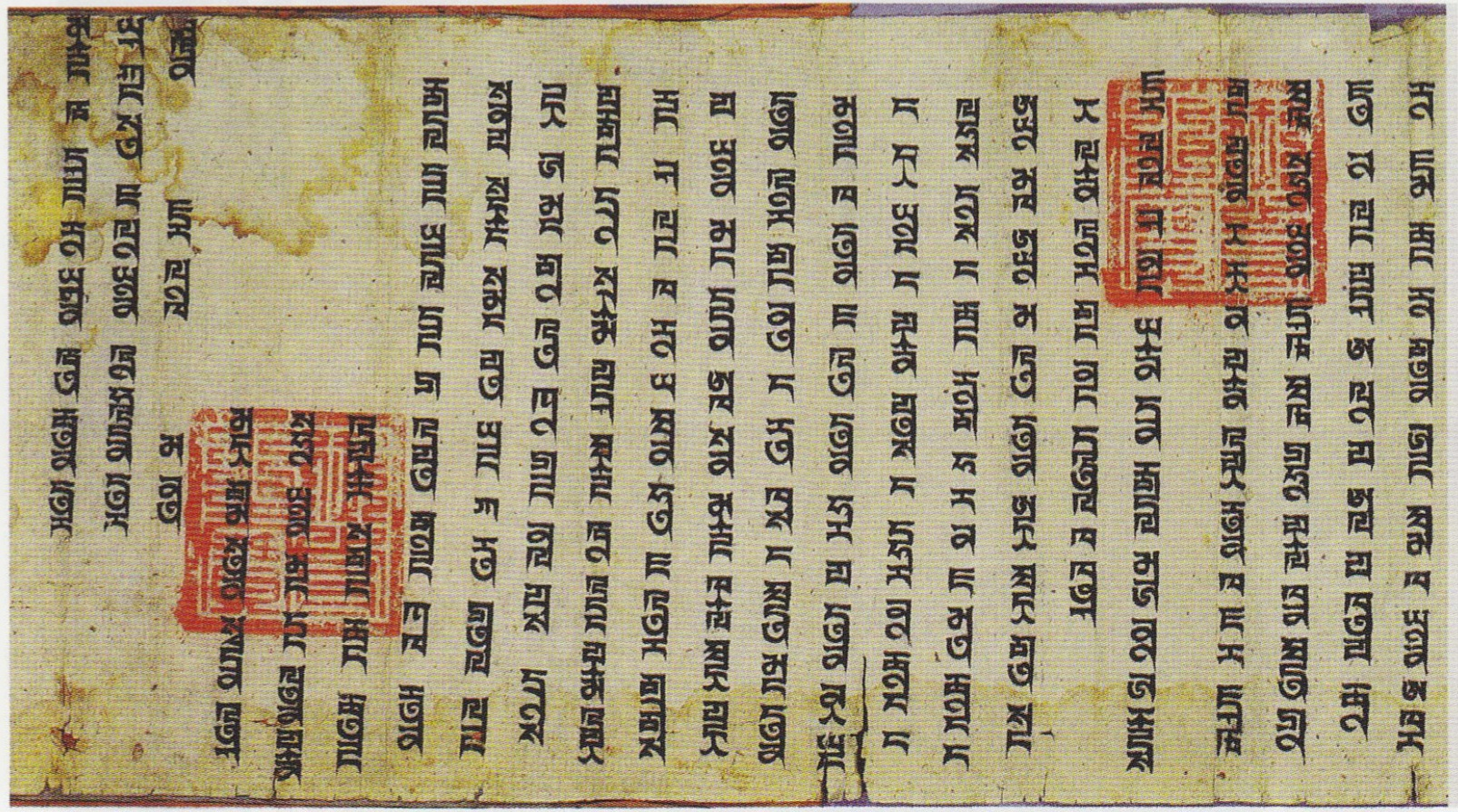
An imperial edict in ʼPhags-pa

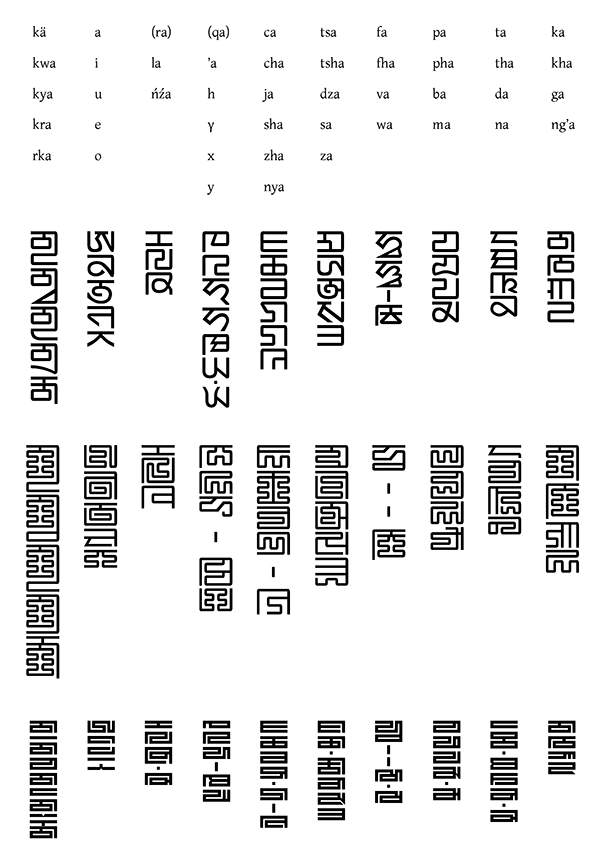
The ʼPhags-pa script, with consonants arranged according to Chinese phonology. At the far left are vowels and medial consonants.

Top: Approximate values in Middle Chinese. (Values in parentheses were not used for Chinese.)
Second: Standard letter forms.
Third: Seal script forms. (A few letters, marked by hyphens, are not distinct from the preceding letter.)

Bottom: The "Tibetan" forms. (Several letters have alternate forms, separated here by a • bullet.)

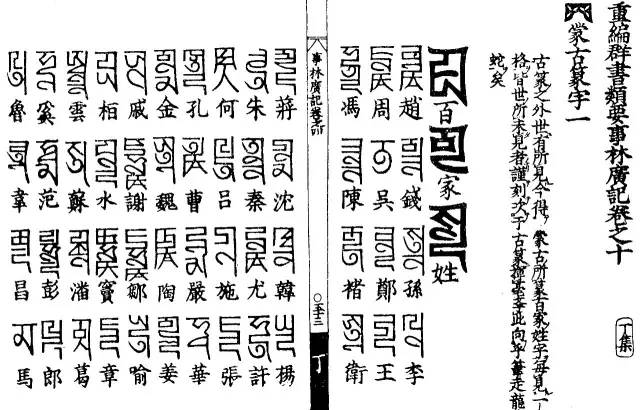
Example of the Chinese poem Hundred Family Surnames written in Phagspa script, from Shilin Guangji written by Chen Yuanjing in the Yuan dynasty

Unlike the ancestral Tibetan script, all ʼPhags-pa letters are written in temporal order (that is, /CV/ is written in the order C–V for all vowels) and in-line (that is, the vowels are not diacritics). However, vowel letters retain distinct initial forms, and short /a/ is not written except initially, making ʼPhags-pa transitional between an abugida, a syllabary, and a full alphabet. The letters of a ʼPhags-pa syllable are linked together so that they form syllabic blocks.

== Typographic forms ==
ʼPhags-pa was written in a variety of graphic forms. The standard form (top, at right) was blocky, but a "Tibetan" form (bottom) was even more so, consisting almost entirely of straight orthogonal lines and right angles. A "seal script" form (Chinese: 蒙古篆字; pinyin: měnggǔ zhuànzì; "Mongolian Seal Script"), used for imperial seals and the like, was more elaborate, with squared sinusoidal lines and spirals. This ʼPhags-pa script is different from the ʼPhags-pa script, or 八思巴字 in Chinese, that shares the same name but its earliest usage can be traced back to the late 16th century, the early reign of Wanli Emperor. According to Professor Junast 照那斯图 of the Chinese Academy of Social Sciences, the later ʼPhags-pa script is actually a seal script of Tibetan.

Korean records state that Hangul was based on an "Old Seal Script" (古篆字), which may be ʼPhags-pa and a reference to its Chinese name Chinese: 蒙古篆字; pinyin: měnggǔ zhuànzì (see origin of Hangul). However, it is the simpler standard form of ʼPhags-pa that is the closer graphic match to Hangul.

== Letters ==
=== Basic letters ===
The following 41 are the basic ʼPhags-pa letters.

Letters 1-30 and 35-38 are base consonants. The order of Letters 1-30 is the same as the traditional order of the thirty basic letters of the Tibetan script, to which they correspond. Letters 35-38 represent sounds that do not occur in Tibetan, and are either derived from an existing Tibetan base consonant (e.g. Letters 2 and 35 are both derived from the simple Tibetan letter ཁ kha, but are graphically distinct from each other) or from a combination of an existing Tibetan base consonant and the semi-vowel (subjoined) ྭ wa (e.g. Letter 36 is derived from the complex Tibetan letter ཁྭ khwa).

As is the case with Tibetan, these letters have an inherent [a] vowel sound attached to them in non-final positions when no other vowel sign is present (e.g. the letter ꡀ with no attached vowel represents the syllable ka, but with an appended vowel ꡞ i represents the syllable ꡀꡞ ki).

Letters 31-34 and 39 are vowels. Letters 31-34 follow the traditional order of the corresponding Tibetan vowels. Letter 39 represents a vowel quality that does not occur in Tibetan, and may be derived from the Tibetan vowel sign ཻ ai.

Unlike Tibetan, in which vowels signs may not occur in isolation but must always be attached to a base consonant to form a valid syllable, in the ʼPhags-pa script initial vowels other than ꡝ a may occur without a base consonant when they are not the first element in a diphthong (e.g. ue) or a digraph (e.g. eeu and eeo). Thus in Chinese ʼPhags-pa texts the syllables u 吾 wú, on 刓 wán and o 訛 é occur, and in Mongolian ʼPhags-pa texts the words ong qo chas "boats", u su nu (gen.) "water", e du -ee "now" and i hee -een "protection" occur. These are all examples of where 'o, 'u, 'e, 'i etc. would be expected if the Tibetan model had been followed exactly. An exception to this rule is the Mongolian word 'er di nis "jewels", where a single vowel sign is attached to a null base consonant. Note that the letter ꡦ ee is never found in an initial position in any language written in the ʼPhags-pa script (for example, in Tao Zongyi's description of the Old Uighur script, he glosses all instances of Uighur 𐽰 e with the ʼPhags-pa letter ꡦ ee, except for when it is found in the initial position, when he glosses it with the ʼPhags-pa letter ꡠ e instead).

However, initial semi-vowels, diphthongs and digraphs must be attached to the null base consonant 'A (Letter 30). So in Chinese ʼPhags-pa texts the syllables 'wen 元 yuán, 'ue 危 wēi and 'eeu 魚 yú occur; and in Mongolian ʼPhags-pa texts the words 'eeu lu "not" and 'eeog bee.e "gave" occur. As there is no sign for the vowel a, which is implicit in an initial base consonant with no attached vowel sign, then words that start with an a vowel must also use the null base consonant letter ꡝ 'a (e.g. Mongolian 'a mi than "living beings"). In Chinese, and rarely Mongolian, another null base consonant ꡖ -a may be found before initial vowels (see "Letter 23" below).

No.	ʼPhags-pa letter	Tibetan derivation	Mongolian examples	Chinese examples
1	ꡀ k	ཀ	Used only for words of foreign origin, such as kal bu dun (gen. pl.) from Sanskrit kalpa "aeon" [cf. Mongolian ᠭᠠᠯᠠᠪ galab], with the single exception of the common Mongolian word ye kee "large, great" [cf. Mongolian ᠶᠡᠬᠡ yeke]	kiw 裘 qiú, kue 夔 kuí
2	ꡁ kh	ཁ	kheen "who" [cf. Mongolian ᠬᠡᠨ ken]	khang 康 kāng, kheeu 屈 qū
3	ꡂ g	ག	bi chig "written document, book" [cf. Mongolian ᠪᠢᠴᠢᠭ bičig]	ging 荊 jīng, gu 古 gǔ
4	ꡃ ŋ	ང	deng ri "heaven" [cf. Mongolian ᠲᠡᠩᠷᠢ tengri]	ngiw 牛 niú, ngem 嚴 yán, ding 丁 dīng
5	ꡄ c	ཅ		cay 柴 chái, ci 池 chí
6	ꡅ ch	ཆ	cha q-an "white" [cf. Mongolian ᠴᠠᠭᠠᠨ čaɣan]	chang 昌 chāng, cheeu 褚 chǔ
7	ꡆ j	ཇ	jil "year" [cf. Mongolian ᠵᠢᠯ ǰil]	jim 針 zhēn
8	ꡇ ɲ	ཉ		nyiw 鈕 niǔ
9	ꡈ t	ཏ	Mostly used in words of foreign origin, such as 'er ti nis (also 'er di nis) "jewels" [cf. Mongolian ᠡᠷᠳᠡᠨᠢᠰ erdenis] and ta layi "sea, ocean" [cf. Mongolian ᠳᠠᠯᠠᠢ dalai]	ten 田 tián, tung 童 tóng
10	ꡉ th	ཐ	thu thum "each, all" [cf. Mongolian ᠲᠤᠲᠤᠮ tutum]	thang 湯 tāng, thung 通 tōng
11	ꡊ d	ད	u ri da nu (gen.) "former, previous" [cf. Mongolian ᠤᠷᠢᠳᠠ urida]	dung 東 dōng, du 都 dū
12	ꡋ n	ན	ma nu "our" [cf. Mongolian ᠮᠠᠨᠤ manu]	nee 聶 niè, nung 農 nóng, gon 管 guǎn
13	ꡌ p	པ	Only used in words of foreign origin, such as pur xan "Buddha" [cf. Mongolian ᠪᠤᠷᠬᠠᠨ burqan]	pang 龐 páng, pay 白 bái
14	ꡍ ph	ཕ		phon 潘 pān, phu 浦 pǔ
15	ꡎ b	བ	ba sa "then, still, also" [cf. Mongolian ᠪᠠᠰᠠ basa]	ban 班 bān, been 邊 biān
16	ꡏ m	མ	'a mi than "living beings" [cf. Mongolian ᠠᠮᠢᠲᠠᠨ amitan]	min 閔 mǐn, mew 苗 miáo, gim 金 jīn
17	ꡐ ts	ཙ		tsaw 曹 cáo, tsin 秦 qín
18	ꡑ tsh	ཚ	Only used in words of foreign origin, such as sha tshin "religion"	tshay 蔡 cài, tshiw 秋 qiū
19	ꡒ dz	ཛ		dzam 昝 zǎn, dzew 焦 jiāo
20	ꡓ w	ཝ	Only used in words of foreign origin, such as wa chi ra ba ni "Vajrapāṇi"	wan 萬 wàn, wu 武 wǔ, xiw 侯 hóu, gaw 高 gāo
21	ꡔ ʒ	ཞ		zheeu 茹 rú, zhew 饒 ráo
22	ꡕ z	ཟ	Only found in the single word za ra "month" [cf. Mongolian ᠰᠠᠷᠠ sara]	zin 陳 chén, zeeu 徐 xú, zi 席 xí
23	ꡖ	འ	This letter is found rarely initially, e.g. -ir gee nee (dat./loc.) "people" [cf. Mongolian ᠢᠷᠭᠡᠨ irgen], but frequently medially between vowels where it serves to separate a syllable that starts with a vowel from a preceding syllable that ends in a vowel, e.g. er khee -ud "Christians" and q-an "emperor, khan" [cf. Mongolian ᠬᠠᠭᠠᠨᠨ qaɣan] (where q-an is a contraction for the hypothetical qa -an)	-an 安 ān, -ing 應 yīng, -eeu 郁 yù
24	ꡗ j	ཡ	na yan "eighty" [cf. Mongolian ᠨᠠᠶᠠᠨ nayan]	yi 伊 yī, yang 羊 yáng, day 戴 dài, hyay 解 xiè
25	ꡘ r	ར	chee rig "army" [cf. Mongolian ᠴᠡᠷᠢᠭ čerig]	
26	ꡙ l	ལ	al ba "tax, tribute" [cf. Mongolian ᠠᠯᠪᠠ alba]	leeu 呂 lǚ, lim 林 lín
27	ꡚ ʃ	ཤ	shi nee "new" [cf. Mongolian ᠱᠢᠨᠡ šine]	shi 石 shí, shwang 雙 shuāng
28	ꡛ s	ས	hee chus "end, goal" [cf. Mongolian ᠡᠴᠦᠰ ečüs]	su 蘇 sū, syang 相 xiàng
29	ꡜ h	ཧ	Initially in words that now have null initials, such as har ban "ten" [cf. Mongolian ᠠᠷᠪᠠᠨ arban], and medially only in the single word -i hee -een (or -i h-een) "protector, guardian"	hwa 花 huā, sh.hi 史 shǐ, l.hing 冷 lěng, j.hang 莊 zhuāng
30	ꡝ ʔ	ཨ	'eeu lu "not" [cf. Mongolian ᠦᠯᠦ ülü]	'wang 王 wáng, 'eeu 虞 yú
31	ꡞ i	ི	-i hee -een (or -i h-een) "protection"	li 李 lǐ, n.hing 能 néng, heei 奚 xī
32	ꡟ u	ུ	u su nu (gen.) "water" [cf. Mongolian ᠤᠰᠤᠨ usun]	u 吳 wú, mue 梅 méi
33	ꡠ e	ེ	e du -ee "now" [cf. Mongolian ᠡᠳᠦᠭᠡ edüge]	ze 謝 xiè, jem 詹 zhān, gue 國 guó
34	ꡡ o	ོ	ong qo chas "boats" [cf. Mongolian ᠣᠩᠭᠣᠴᠠᠰ ongɣočas]	no 那 nā, mon 滿 mǎn
35	ꡢ q	ཁ	qa muq "all" [cf. Mongolian ᠬᠠᠮᠤᠭ qamuɣ]	
36	ꡣ x	ཁྭ	Only used in words of foreign origin, such as pur xan "Buddha" [cf. Mongolian ᠪᠤᠷᠬᠠᠨ burqan]	xu 胡 hú, xong 黃 huáng
37	ꡤ f	ཧྭ		fang 方 fāng, fi 費 fèi
38	ꡥ	ག		
39	ꡦ iː	ཻ	el deeb "various" [cf. Mongolian ᠡᠯᠳᠡᠪ eldeb] (Poppe reads this word as eel deeb, as the only example of an initial ꡦ ee)	chee 車 chē, seeu 胥 xū, geeing 經 jīng
40	ꡧ w	ྭ		xway 懷 huái, jwaw 卓 zhuō, gwang 廣 guǎng
41	ꡨ j	ྱ		hya 夏 xià, gya 家 jiā, dzyang 蔣 jiǎng

=== Additional letters ===
No.	ʼPhags-pa letter	Tibetan derivation	Sanskrit or Tibetan Examples
42	ꡩ tt	ཊ	sha tt-a pa ... i ta (Sanskrit ṣaṭ pāramitā) [Ill.3 Line 6]
43	ꡪ tth	ཋ	pra tish tthi te (Sanskrit pratiṣṭhite) [Ill.3 Line 8] (TTHA plus unreversed I) dhish tthi te (Sanskrit dhiṣṭhite) [Tathāgatahṛdaya-dhāraṇī Line 16] (TTHA plus reversed I) nish tthe (Sanskrit niṣṭhe) [Tathāgatahṛdaya-dhāraṇī Line 10] (TTHA plus reversed E)
44	ꡫ dd	ཌ	dann dde (Sanskrit daṇḍaya) [Tathāgatahṛdaya-dhāraṇī Line 14] '-a kad ddha ya (Sanskrit ākaḍḍhaya) [Ill.4 Line 7] (DDA plus reversed HA)
45	ꡬ nn	ཎ	sb-a ra nna (Sanskrit spharaṇa) [Ill.3 Line 3] ush nni ... (Sanskrit uṣṇīṣa) [Ill.3 Line 6] (NNA plus reversed I) kshu nnu (Sanskrit kṣuṇu) [Tathāgatahṛdaya-dhāraṇī Line 2] (NNA plus reversed U) ha ra nne (Sanskrit haraṇe) [Ill.4 Line 5] (NNA plus reversed E) pu nn.ya (Sanskrit puṇya) [Tathāgatahṛdaya-dhāraṇī Line 13] (NNA plus reversed subjoined Y)
46	ꡱ r	ྲ	bh-ru^ (Sanskrit bhrūṁ) [Ill.3 Line 2] mu dre (Sanskrit mudre) [Ill.3 Line 9] ba dzra (Sanskrit vajra) [Ill.3 Line 9] bkra shis (Tibetan bkra-shis "prosperity, good fortune") [Ill.5]
47	ꡲ r	ར	sangs rgyas (Tibetan sangs-rgyas "Buddha") [Ill.6]
48	ꡳ^	ྃ	o^ bh-ru^ bh-ru^ (Sanskrit oṁ bhrūṁ bhrūṁ) [Ill.3 Line 2] sa^ ha ... (Sanskrit saṁhatana) [Ill.3 Line 9]

=== Menggu Ziyun ===
Following are the initials of the ʼPhags-pa script as presented in Menggu Ziyun. They are ordered according to the Chinese philological tradition of the 36 initials.

36 initials in 蒙古字韵 Menggu Ziyun
No.	Name	Phonetic value	ʼPhags-pa letter	ʼPhags-pa Initial	Notes
1	見 jiàn	*[k]	ꡂ	g-	
2	溪 qī	*[kʰ]	ꡁ	kh-	
3	群 qún	*[ɡ]	ꡀ	k-	
4	疑 yí	*[ŋ]	ꡃ	ng-	
5	端 duān	*[t]	ꡊ	d-	
6	透 tòu	*[tʰ]	ꡉ	th-	
7	定 dìng	*[d]	ꡈ	t-	
8	泥 ní	*[n]	ꡋ	n-	
9	知 zhī	*[ʈ]	ꡆ	j-	
10	徹 chè	*[ʈʰ]	ꡅ	ch-	
11	澄 chéng	*[ɖ]	ꡄ	c-	
12	娘 niáng	*[ɳ]	ꡇ	ny-	
13	幫 bāng	*[p]	ꡎ	b-	
14	滂 pāng	*[pʰ]	ꡍ	ph-	
15	並 bìng	*[b]	ꡌ	p-	
16	明 míng	*[m]	ꡏ	m-	
17	非 fēi	*[p̪]	ꡤ	f-	Normal form of the letter fa
18	敷 fū	*[p̪ʰ]	ꡰ	f¹-	Variant form of the letter fa
19	奉 fèng	*[b̪]	ꡤ	f-	Normal form of the letter fa
20	微 wēi	*[ɱ]	ꡓ	w-	Represents [v]
21	精 jīng	*[ts]	ꡒ	dz-	
22	清 qīng	*[tsʰ]	ꡑ	tsh-	
23	從 cóng	*[dz]	ꡐ	ts-	
24	心 xīn	*[s]	ꡛ	s-	
25	邪 xié	*[z]	ꡕ	z-	
26	照 zhào	*[tɕ]	ꡆ	j-	
27	穿 chuān	*[tɕʰ]	ꡅ	ch-	
28	床 chuáng	*[dʑ]	ꡄ	c-	
29	審 shěn	*[ɕ]	ꡮ	sh¹-	Variant form of the letter sha
30	禪 chán	*[ʑ]	ꡚ	sh-	Normal form of the letter sha
31	曉 xiǎo	*[x]	ꡜ	h-	Normal form of the letter ha
32	匣 xiá	*[ɣ]	ꡣ	x-	
32	匣 xiá	*[ɣ]	ꡯ	h¹-	Variant form of the letter ha
33	影 yǐng	*[ʔ]	ꡖ	ʼ-	glottal stop
33	影 yǐng	*[ʔ]	ꡗ	y-	Normal form of the letter ya
34	喻 yù	*[j]	ꡝ	-	null initial
34	喻 yù	*[j]	ꡭ	y¹-	Variant form of the letter ya
35	來 lái	*[l]	ꡙ	l-	
36	日 rì	*[ɲ]	ꡔ	zh-	

=== Shilin Guangji ===
The Shilin Guangji used Phagspa to annotate Chinese text, serving as a precursor to modern pinyin. The following are the Phagspa transcriptions of a section of the Hundred Family Surnames in the Shilin Guangji. For example, the name Jin (金), meaning gold, is written as ꡂꡞꡏ gim.

Hundred Family Surnames 百家姓蒙古文 Bǎi Jiā Xìng Měng Gǔ Wén ꡎꡗ ꡂꡨ ꡛꡞꡃ ꡏꡟꡃ ꡂꡟ ꡓꡟꡋ Bay Gya Sing Mung Gu Wun
	1	2	3	4	5	6	7	8	9	10
ʼPhags-pa Spelling	ꡄꡠꡓ cew	ꡒꡠꡋ dzen	ꡛꡟꡋ sun	ꡙꡞ li	ꡆꡞꡓ jiw	ꡟ u	ꡄꡞꡃ cing	ꡝꡧꡃ 'wang	ꡤꡟꡃ fung	ꡄꡞꡋ cin
Chinese Character	趙 zhào	錢 qián	孫 sūn	李 lǐ	周 zhōu	吳 wú	鄭 zhèng	王 wáng	馮 féng	陳 chén

== Unicode ==
ʼPhags-pa script was added to the Unicode Standard in July 2006 with the release of version 5.0.

The Unicode block for ʼPhags-pa is U+A840–U+A877:

Phags-pa^{[1]}^{[2]} Official Unicode Consortium code chart (PDF)
	0	1	2	3	4	5	6	7	8	9	A	B	C	D	E	F
U+A84x	ꡀ	ꡁ	ꡂ	ꡃ	ꡄ	ꡅ	ꡆ	ꡇ	ꡈ	ꡉ	ꡊ	ꡋ	ꡌ	ꡍ	ꡎ	ꡏ
U+A85x	ꡐ	ꡑ	ꡒ	ꡓ	ꡔ	ꡕ	ꡖ	ꡗ	ꡘ	ꡙ	ꡚ	ꡛ	ꡜ	ꡝ	ꡞ	ꡟ
U+A86x	ꡠ	ꡡ	ꡢ	ꡣ	ꡤ	ꡥ	ꡦ	ꡧ	ꡨ	ꡩ	ꡪ	ꡫ	ꡬ	ꡭ	ꡮ	ꡯ
U+A87x	ꡰ	ꡱ	ꡲ	ꡳ	꡴	꡵	꡶	꡷								
Notes 1.As of Unicode version 17.0 2.Grey areas indicate non-assigned code points

U+A856 ꡖ PHAGS-PA LETTER SMALL A is transliterated using U+A78F ꞏ LATIN LETTER SINOLOGICAL DOT from the Latin Extended-D Unicode block.

== See also ==
- Brahmic scripts
- Mongolian alphabets
- Origin of hangul
- Mongol elements in Western medieval art
- Menggu Ziyun (Yuan dynasty ʼPhags-pa—Chinese rhyming dictionary)
- Shilin Guangji
- Siddhaṃ script
