= Rime =

Rime may refer to:

- Rime ice, ice that forms when water droplets in fog freeze to the outer surfaces of objects, such as trees.

Rime is also an alternative spelling of "rhyme" as a noun:

- Syllable rime, term used in the study of phonology in linguistics
- Rime dictionary, type of ancient Chinese dictionary used for writing poetry
- Rime table, a syllable chart of the Chinese language
- Rime riche, a form of rhyme using identical sounds

== Literature ==
- The Rime of the Ancient Mariner, a 1798 poem by Samuel Taylor Coleridge
- Le Rime, a collection of lyrical poems by Dante Alighieri
- The Rime of King William, a poetic eulogy of William the Conqueror written in Old English

== Other uses ==
- Noémi Rime, French opera singer
- Rimé movement, an ecumenical movement within Tibetan Buddhism
- RelayNet International Mail Exchange (RIME), an e-mail exchange networking protocol
- Rime (video game), an action-adventure video game

== See also ==
- Rhyme, a repetition of identical or similar sounds in two or more different words
- Rimes, a surname
- Ryme, England, UK
- Rhyme (disambiguation)
