= Qiyin lüe =

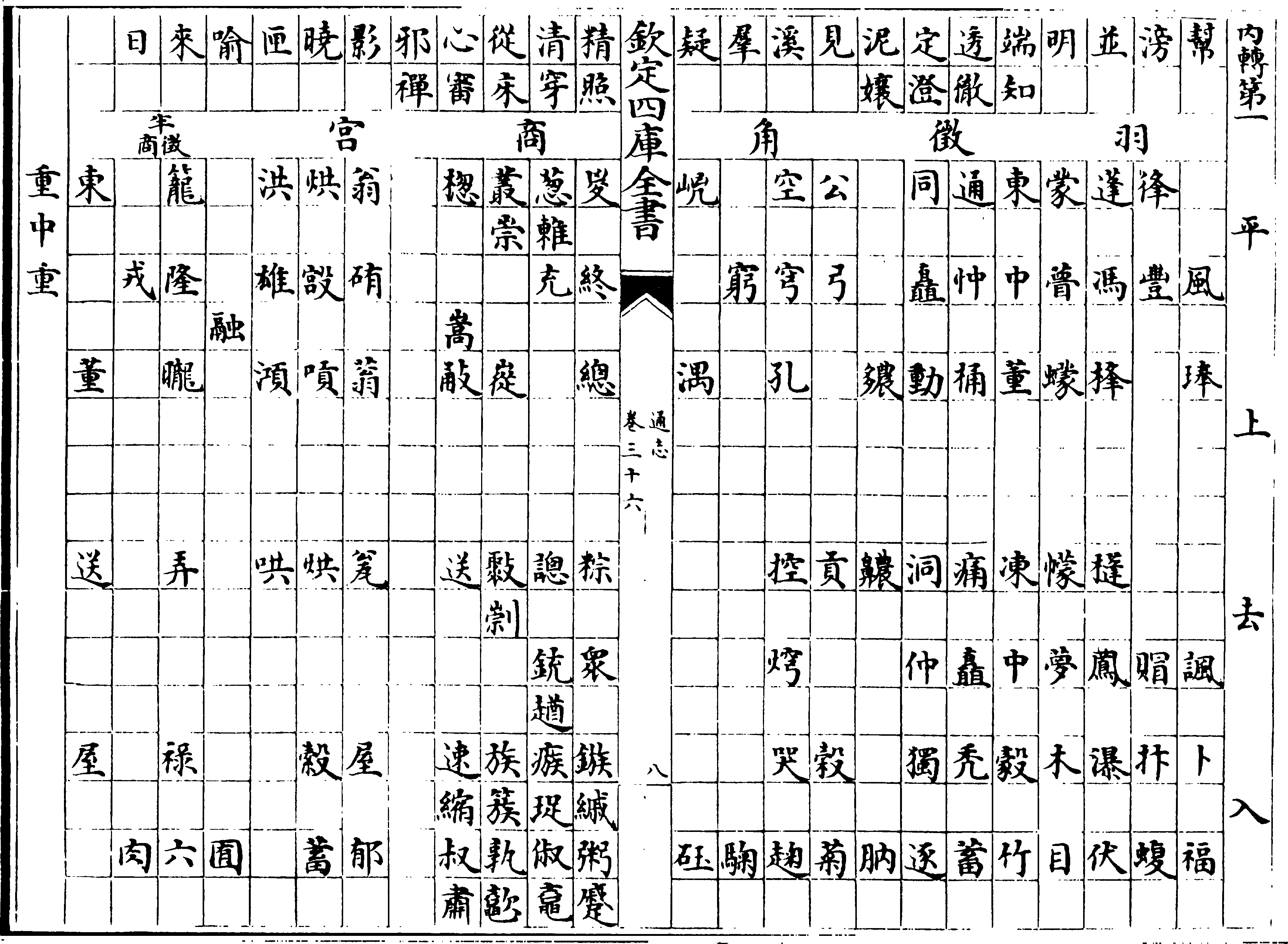
First table of the Qiyin lüe

The Qiyin lüe (Chinese: 七音略; pinyin: Qīyīn lüè; Wade–Giles: Chi-yin lüeh; lit. 'Seven Sounds Summary') is a Chinese rime table, which dates to before 1161. This reference work survived to the present largely because the Song dynasty historian Zheng Qiao (鄭樵/郑樵; Cheng Ch'iao; 1104–1162) included it in his 1161 encyclopedia Tongzhi.

The Chinese linguist Luo Changpei wrote a definitive study (1935) of the Qiyin lüe. The structure and contents of the work is closely related to the Yunjing, and the two are believed to derive from a common source prior to the Song dynasty. Both have tables combining rows for a particular final rime, columns for various initials, and up to four tones.

== See also ==
- Rime dictionary
