= Rimes =

Rimes is a surname. It is an English surname of unexplained origin, as well as a Huguenot surname which possibly originated as a habitational surname from the city of Reims. Variant spellings include Rhymes. Statistics compiled by Patrick Hanks on the basis of the 2011 United Kingdom census and the Census of Ireland 2011 found 230 people with the surname Rimes on the island of Great Britain and four on the island of Ireland. In the 1881 United Kingdom census there were 186 bearers of the surname, primarily at Somerset. The 2010 United States census found 1,108 people with the surname Rimes, making it the 23,065th-most-common surname in the country. This represented an increase from 1,006 people (23,530th-most-common) in the 2000 census. In both US censuses, roughly eight-tenths of the bearers of the surname identified as non-Hispanic white, and one-tenth as non-Hispanic black.

People with this name include:

- Susan Rimes (born 1959), American tennis player
- Leonardo Rimes da Cunha (born 1979), Brazilian footballer
- LeAnn Rimes (born 1982), American singer-songwriter
- Irina Rimes (born 1992), Moldovan singer-songwriter

== See also ==
- Toby Rimes, a mythical poodle
- Shonda Rhimes (born 1970), American television producer
- Rime (disambiguation)
