= The Rhyme =

The Rhyme may refer to:

- The Rhyme (XM), a former XM Satellite Radio channel
- The Rhyme (song), a 1996 song by Keith Murray

== See also ==
- Rhyme (disambiguation)
