= Yunjing =

Chinese rime table ()

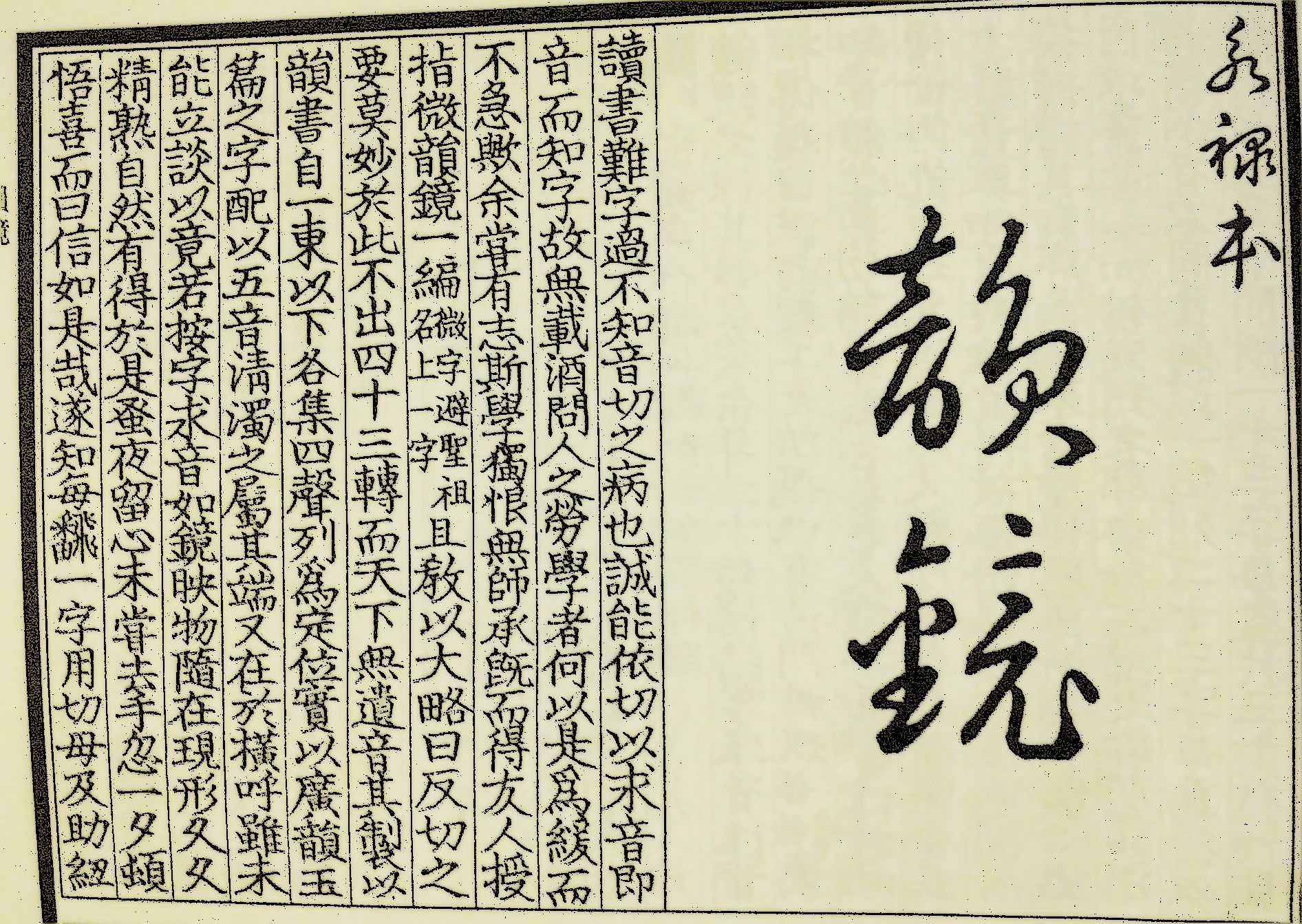
- Title page of the Yonglu edition
- Traditional Chinese: 韻鏡
- Simplified Chinese: 韵镜
- Literal meaning: Mirror of rhymes
Transcriptions
Standard Mandarin
- Hanyu Pinyin: Yùnjìng
- Wade–Giles: Yün^{4}-ching^{4}
- IPA: [ŷntɕîŋ]
Yue: Cantonese
- Yale Romanization: Wahngeng
- Jyutping: Wan^{6}-geng^{3}
- IPA: [wɐn˨.kɛŋ˧]
Southern Min
- Tâi-lô: Ūn-kiànn
Middle Chinese
- Middle Chinese: Jwən^{C} kjɐng^{C}

The Yunjing is one of the two oldest existing examples of a Chinese rime table – a series of charts which arrange Chinese characters in large tables according to their tone and syllable structures to indicate their proper pronunciations. Current versions of the Yunjing date to AD 1161 and 1203 editions published by Zhang Linzhi (張麟之). The original author(s) and date of composition of the Yunjing are unknown. Some of its elements, such as certain choices in its ordering, reflect features particular to the Tang dynasty, but no conclusive proof of an actual date of composition has yet been found.

The Yunjing contains 43 tables (Chinese: 轉; pinyin: zhuǎn; lit. 'turnings'), each of which tabulates combinations of a particular final rhyme (listed in rows) with various initials (listed in columns), in up to four tones, to show in a grid pattern all possible syllables. Empty circles on the grid denote that the authors were unaware of any word with that particular pronunciation. By locating a character in Yunjing, a reader could identify its initial consonant (by looking at its column) and its "rhyme", or main vowel and ending consonant (by looking at its row), and combine the two to obtain the word's pronunciation. Zhang Linzhi's prefaces list a total of 36 possible initial consonants (聲母; shēngmǔ) – by comparison, modern Standard Chinese only has 23 and modern Cantonese only has 18 or 19.

Historical Chinese phonology uses the Yunjing as an accurate representation of Late Middle Chinese (10th–12th century) phonology. The Yunjing's use of this system represents a significant advancement in the Chinese' analysis of their own language, and is believed to have been inspired by their studies of Sanskrit phonological treatises and Buddhist mantras written in the Siddham script during the Sui and Tang dynasties.

== Layout ==
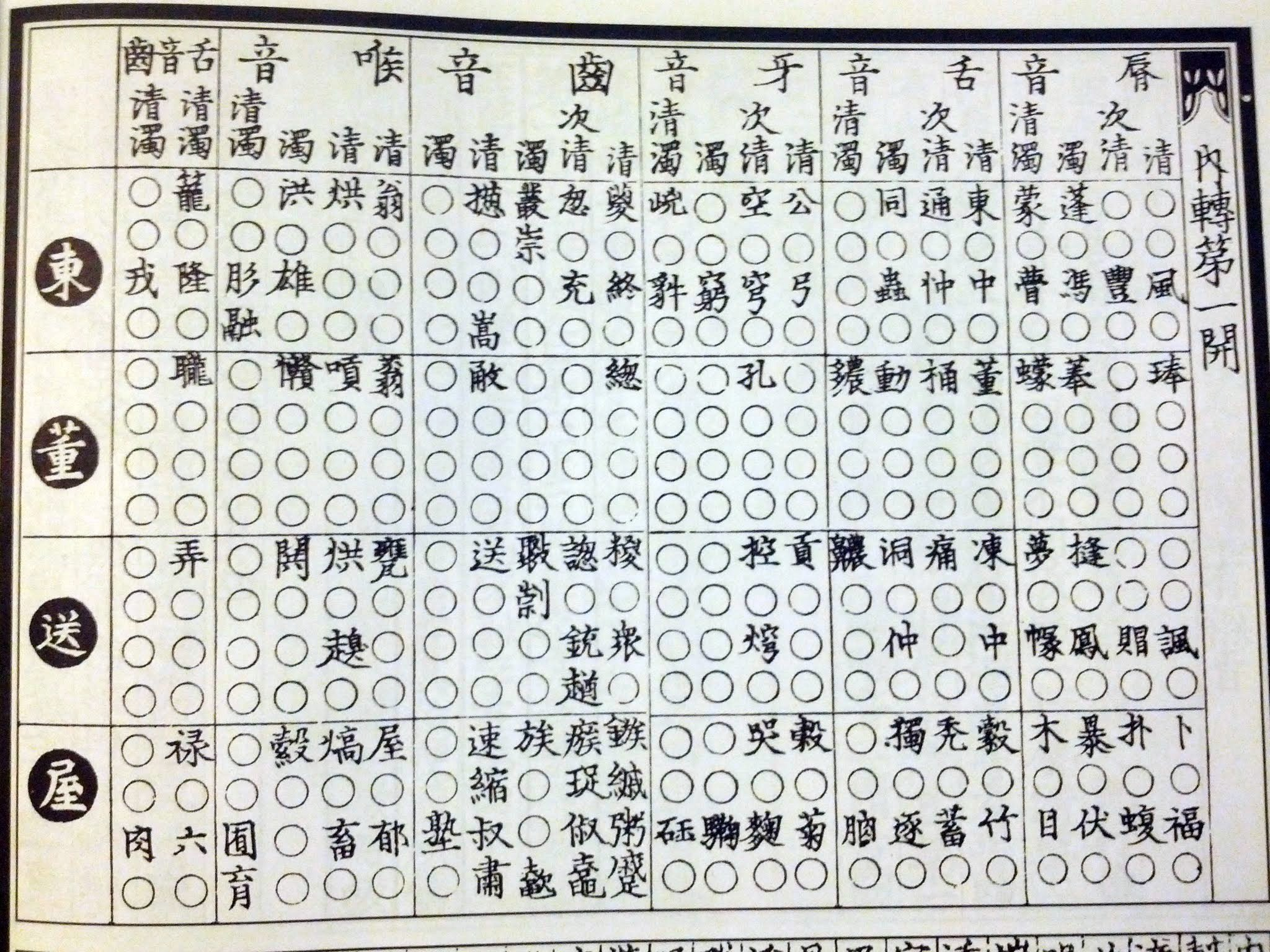
The first table of the Yunjing

=== Rows (Finals/Rhymes) ===
Each of the 43 tables in the Yunjing is first divided into four large rows that correspond to the four tones of Middle Chinese: the level tone (Chinese: 平聲; pinyin: píngshēng), the rising tone (Chinese: 上聲; pinyin: shǎngshēng), the departing tone (Chinese: 去聲; pinyin: qùshēng), and the entering tone (Chinese: 入聲; pinyin: rùshēng). They are not explicitly marked as such, but the four characters are taken from each of the tone categories of the Guangyun rhyme dictionary. In the image at right, the first row – the level tone – is occupied by the level tone rhyme dōng 東, the second row – the rising tone – by the dǒng 董 rhyme, the third row – the departing tone – by sòng 送, and the fourth row – the entering tone – by wū 屋 (Cantonese: uk^{1}).

Each large row is further subdivided into four grades or divisions (Chinese: 等; pinyin: děng), forming four rows within each larger row. Characters' placement in the first through fourth grade seems to be related to their medial (glide) and main vowel, though their exact distinction is unclear.

=== Columns (Initials) ===
Each table is divided into six large columns representing syllables' place of articulation:

- "Lip sounds" (Chinese: 唇音; pinyin: chúnyīn)
- "Tongue sounds" (Chinese: 舌音; pinyin: shéyīn)
- "Molar sounds" (Chinese: 牙音; pinyin: yáyīn)
- "Tooth sounds" (Chinese: 齒音; pinyin: chǐyīn)
- "Throat sounds" (Chinese: 喉音; pinyin: hóuyīn)
- "Tongue-tooth sounds" (Chinese: 舌齒音; pinyin: shéchǐyīn)

Large columns are further subdivided into two to five smaller columns, which can represent one of four possible sub-categories:

  - "Clear" sounds (Chinese: 清; pinyin: qīng) – voiceless unaspirated
  - "Secondarily-clear" sounds (Chinese: 次清; pinyin: cìqīng) – voiceless aspirated
  - "Muddy" sounds (Chinese: 濁; pinyin: zhuó) – voiced
  - "Clear-muddy" sounds (Chinese: 清濁; pinyin: qīngzhuó) – nasal stops

The Yunjing tables have only 23 columns – some columns represent more than one of the 36 possible initial consonants. Other rhyme tables, such as the Qieyun zhizhangtu (Chinese: 切韻指掌圖), do not combine the initials and have 36 full columns.

== See also ==
- Rhyme dictionary
- Qiyin lüe

== Citations ==
- Baxter, William H. (1992), A Handbook of Old Chinese Phonology, Berlin: Mouton de Gruyter, ISBN 978-3-11-012324-1.
