= Kanmiu Buque Qieyun =

The Kanmiu Buque Qieyun (刊謬補缺切韻) by Wang Renxu (王仁昫), which was published in 706, is the oldest extant Chinese rime dictionary. For many centuries, it was believed to be lost, until a copy was found at the imperial palace in Beijing in 1947. Lóng 1968 published an eye copy with annotations. Zhou 1983: 434-527 includes a facsimile of the original, which is not very legible.

There are three versions of Kānmiù Bǔquē Qièyùn, which are typically distinguished by numerals, known as 王一, 王二, and 王三.

The first version, 王一, is known only from a Dunhuang manuscript fragment (P. 2011). The second, 王二, is also called Xiàngbáběn 项跋本, because it contains a postscript by Xiang Yuanbian, or Péiwùqí Zhèngzìběn 裴务齐正字本. The third version, 王三, is also referred to as Quánwáng 全王 (because it is complete), Gùgōngběn 故宫本 (because it was found in the Palace Museum), or Sòngbáběn 宋跋本 (because there is a postscript by Song Lian). Generally speaking, the first and third versions are most alike, whereas the second is more distinct, and it is often considered to be a combination of Kānmiù Bǔquē Qièyùn 刊谬补缺切韵 by Wang Renxu per se and Jiānzhùběn Qièyùn 笺注本切韵 by Zhǎngsūn Nèyán 长孙讷言, maybe S. 2055 (Zhōu Zǔmó 周祖谟, 1983; Tóng Xiǎolín 仝小琳, 2008).

== Works cited ==
- Bottéro, François (2013), "The Qièyùn manuscripts from Dūnhuáng", in Galambos, Imre (ed.), Studies in Chinese Manuscripts: From the Warring States Period to the 20th Century (PDF), Budapest: Eötvös Loránd University, pp. 33–48, ISBN 978-963-284-326-1.
- Lóng Yǔchún 龍宇純 (1968), 唐寫全本王仁昫刊謬補缺切韻校箋 Táng xiě quánběn Wáng Rénxù Kānmiù bǔquē Qièyùn jiào jiān. [Notes on the 刊謬補缺切韻 Kānmiù bǔquē Qièyùn by 王仁煦 Wáng Rénxù, written in the Táng dynasty.], Xiānggǎng 香港: Xiānggǎng Zhōngwén dàxué 香港中文大學.
- 仝小琳 (2008), "论韵书残卷 P 3798 和相关韵书", 语言研究 Studies in Language and Linguisties, 28 (2): 38-41
- Zhōu Zǔmó 周祖謨 (1983), 唐五代韻書集存 Táng wǔdài yùnshū jícún [Collected rime books of the Tang and Five Dynasties, Zhōnghuá shūjú 中華書局
