= Rhyme (disambiguation) =

Rhyme is a form of poetry or speech.

Rhyme or Rhymes may also refer to:

- HTC Rhyme, a mobile phone
- Paulie Rhyme, American rapper
- Rhyme (linguistics)
- "The Rhyme" (song), a hip hop song from the Keith Murray album Enigma
- Rhymes (surname)
- "Rhymes", a song by The Goons With The Wormwood Scrubs Screws Orchestra
- The Rhymes by Petrarch

== See also ==
- Ryme Intrinseca, a village in Dorset, England, UK
- Rime (disambiguation)
