= Rime table =

Chinese syllable sound charts

A rime table or rhyme table (simplified Chinese: 韵图; traditional Chinese: 韻圖; pinyin: yùntú; Wade–Giles: yün-t'u) is a Chinese phonological model, tabulating the syllables of the series of rime dictionaries beginning with the Qieyun (601) by their onsets, rhyme groups, tones and other properties. The method gave a significantly more precise and systematic account of the sounds of those dictionaries than the previously used fǎnqiè analysis, but many of its details remain obscure. The phonological system that is implicit in the rime dictionaries and analysed in the rime tables is known as Middle Chinese, and is the traditional starting point for efforts to recover the sounds of early forms of Chinese. Some authors distinguish the phonological systems of rime dictionaries based on the Qieyun (7th century CE) and that of later rime tables beginning with the Yunjing (12th century CE) as Early Middle Chinese (EMC) and Late Middle Chinese (LMC), respectively.

The earliest rime tables are associated with Chinese Buddhist monks, who are believed to have been inspired by the Sanskrit syllable charts in the Siddham script they used to study the language. The oldest extant rime tables are the 12th-century Yunjing ('mirror of rhymes') and Qiyin lüe ('summary of the seven sounds'), which are very similar, and believed to derive from a common prototype. Earlier fragmentary documents describing the analysis have been found at Dunhuang, suggesting that the tradition may date back to the late Tang dynasty.

Some scholars, such as the Swedish linguist Bernhard Karlgren, use the French spelling rime for the categories described in these works, to distinguish them from the concept of poetic rhyme.

== History ==
The Fù Sòng Yǒnglù edition of the Yunjing, printed in Japan in 1564

The Qieyun, produced by Lu Fayan (陸法言; Lù Fǎyán) in 601, was a rime dictionary, serving as a guide to the recitation of literary texts and an aid in the composition of verse. It quickly became popular during the Tang dynasty, leading to a series of revised and expanded editions, the most important of which was the Guangyun (1008). In these dictionaries, characters were grouped first by the four tones, and then into rhyme groups. Each rhyme group was subdivided into groups of homophonous characters, with the pronunciation of each given by a fanqie formula, a pair of familiar characters indicating the sounds of the initial and final parts of a syllable respectively. The dictionaries typically used several characters for each initial or final.

The fanqie method of indicating pronunciation made the dictionaries awkward to use. The děngyùnxué (等韻學 'study of classified rhymes') was a more sophisticated analysis of the Qieyun pronunciations, initially developed by Chinese Buddhist monks who were studying Indian linguistics. A tantalizing glimpse of this tradition is offered by fragments from Dunhuang. A fragment held by the British Library (Or.8210/S.512) simply lists 30 initial consonants. Another document includes three fragments attributed to a monk called Shǒuwēn (守溫), who may have lived as early as the 9th century. These fragments do not contain tables, but describe the phonological analysis that underlies them.

The oldest known rhyme tables are a version of the Yunjing published with prefaces dated 1161 and 1203, and the Qiyin lüe, which was included in the 1161 encyclopedia Tongzhi. The two are very similar, and are believed to be derived from a single version pre-dating the Song dynasty. The tables were accompanied by a body of teachings known as ménfǎ (門法 'school precepts'), including rules for placing fanqie spellings that did not conform to the system within the tables.

Later rhyme tables were more elaborate. The Sìshēng děngzǐ (四聲等子) was probably created during the Northern Song, and explicitly introduced broad rhyme classes (shè 攝), which were previously implicit in the ordering of the tables. The preface of the Qièyùn zhǐzhǎngtú (切韻指掌圖) is dated 1203, in the Southern Song. In this work the tables are restructured with separate columns for each of the 36 initials. The Jīng shǐ zhèng yīn Qièyùn zhǐnán (經史正音切韻指南), produced by Liú Jiàn (劉鑑) in 1336, was the basis for one of the two sets of rime tables at the front of the Kangxi dictionary.

The Yunjing was lost in China for several centuries. The Qieyun zhizhangtu, incorrectly attributed to the 11th century scholar Sima Guang, was believed to be the oldest of the rime tables, and was used in the earliest reconstruction efforts. However, in the 1880s several versions of the Yunjing were discovered in Japan. Comparison with the Qiyin lüe showed that they were based on a common model, of which the other rime tables were later refinements. All recent reconstruction work has been based on the Yunjing. The Fù Sòng Yǒnglù (覆宋永禄) edition of 1564 is considered the most reliable, and is the basis of all reproductions in circulation. (Note: This edition is so named because it was published in the Eiroku (永禄) era, pronounced in Chinese as Yǒnglù.)

== Structure ==
In the medieval rime dictionaries, characters were organized into rhyme groups (韵 yùn), with 193 groups in the Qieyun, growing to 206 in the Guangyun. The order of the rhyme groups within each tone implies a correspondence between rhyme groups across the four tones. Thus for each rhyme group with an -m, -n or -ng coda in the level tone there are typically corresponding rhyme groups with the same coda in the rising and departing tones, and a corresponding rhyme group in the entering tone with a -p, -t or -k coda respectively. (Note: These tones differ from the four tones of Modern Standard Chinese, though related tone systems are retained by many southern languages.) In contrast, syllables with vocalic codas typically had corresponding rhyme groups only in the level, rising and departing tones. There were also four departing tone rhyme groups with -j codas that had no counterparts in the other tones.

The rime tables were solely concerned with the pronunciation of syllables of these rime dictionaries, and do not contain dictionary-like material such as definitions. Similarly, where a group of characters are recorded as homophones in the rime dictionaries, typically only one will occur in a rime table. A rime table book presents these distinct syllables in a number of tabular charts, each devoted to one or more sets of parallel rhyme groups across the tones.

The preface to Qieyun indicates that it represented a compromise between northern and southern reading pronunciations from the late Northern and Southern dynasties period. (Note: For translations of the Qieyun preface, see Baxter (1992), pp. 35–36 and Ramsey (1989), pp. 116–117.) Most linguists now believe that no single dialect contained all the distinctions it recorded, but that each distinction did occur somewhere. The rime tables were compiled centuries later in the time of a new standard, and many of the distinctions in the Qieyun would have been meaningless to the compilers. Edwin Pulleyblank has argued that the tables contain enough evidence to reconstruct the speech of that later period. He calls this language Late Middle Chinese (LMC) in contrast to the Early Middle Chinese of the Qieyun, and argues that it was the standard speech of the imperial capital Chang'an in the late Tang dynasty. His reconstruction accounts for most of the distinctions in modern varieties of Chinese (except Min), as well as layers of Chinese loanwords, such as the Kan-on layer of Sino-Japanese vocabulary.

=== Tables ===
Each chart of the Yunjing is labelled as either "open" (開; kāi ) or "closed" (合; hé). The corresponding terms in the Qiyin lüe are "heavy" (重; zhòng) and "light" (輕; qīng). The open/closed distinction is interpreted to indicate the absence or presence of lip rounding (often transcribed as -w- or -u-). Some Guangyun rhyme groups include syllables of both kinds, and thus span two charts, while others are purely "open" or "closed", and thus fit within one chart. Charts are grouped together in broad rhyme classes (攝; shè), each characterized as either "inner" (內; nèi) or "outer" (外; wài), thought to be related to vowel heights, contrasting close vowels and open vowels respectively.

For example, the first of the 43 charts of the Yùnjìng is shown below (the Arabic numerals are modern annotations):

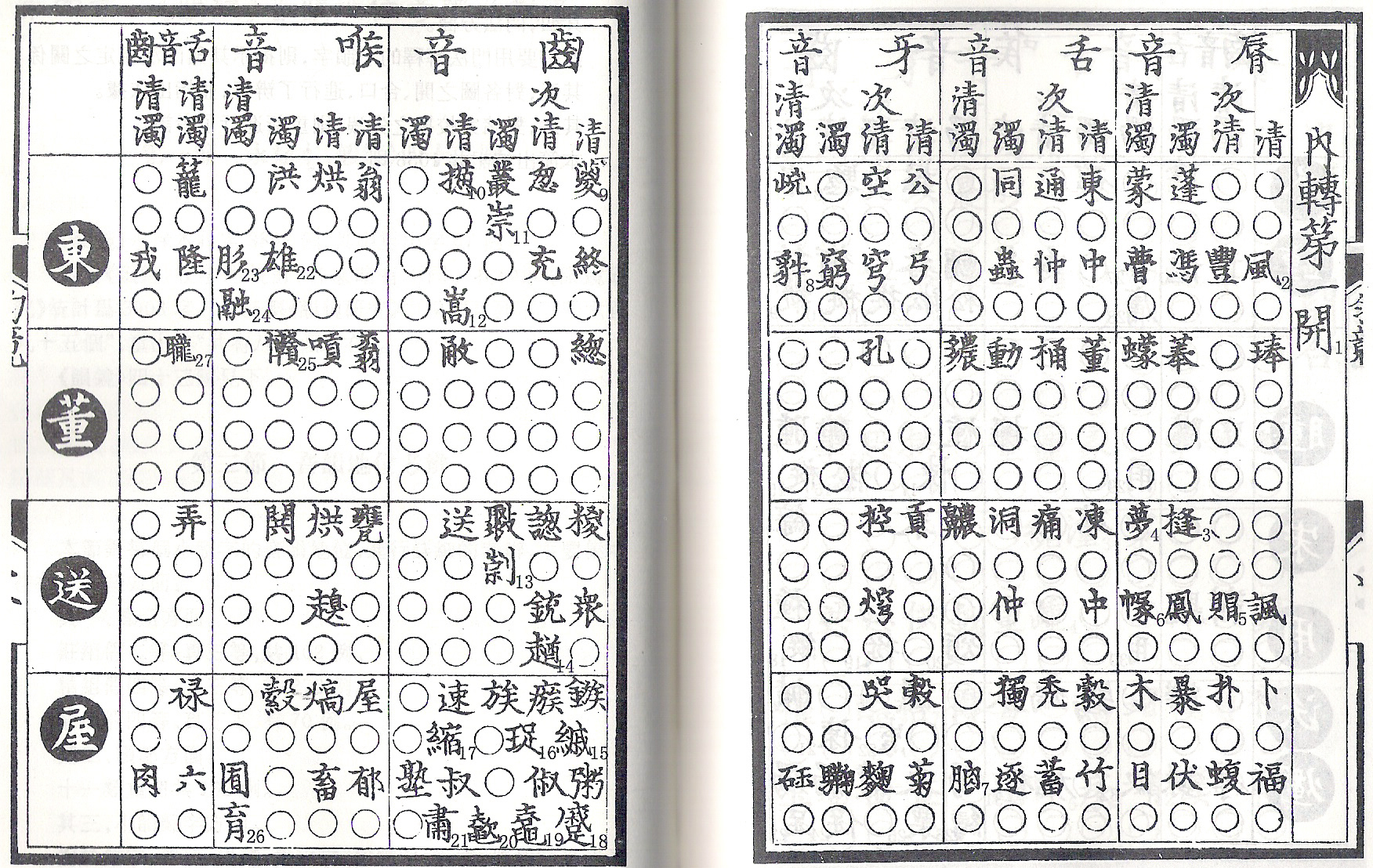

The five big characters on the right-hand side read Nèi zhuǎn dìyī kāi (內轉第一開). In the Yùnjìng, each chart is called a zhuǎn (lit. 'turn'). The characters indicate that the chart is the first (第一) one in the book, and that the syllables of this chart are "inner" (內) and "open" (開).

The columns of each table classify syllables according to their initial consonant (shēngmǔ 聲母 lit. 'sound mother'), with syllables beginning with a vowel considered to have a "zero initial". Initials are classified according to

- place of articulation: labials (chún 脣 'lip'), alveolars (shé 舌 'tongue'), velars (yá 牙 'back tooth'), affricates and sibilants (chǐ 齒 "front tooth"), and laryngeals (hóu 喉 'throat'). The values of the last category remain controversial.
- manner of articulation: voiceless (qīng 清 'clear'), voiceless aspirated (cìqīng 次清 'secondary clear'), voiced (zhuó 濁 'muddy') or nasal or liquid (qīngzhuó 清濁 'clear muddy').

The order of the places and manners roughly match that of Sanskrit, providing further evidence of inspiration from Indian phonology.

Each table had 16 rows, with a group of four rows for each of the four tones of the Qieyun. The above chart covers four parallel Guangyun rhyme groups, the level-toned 東 dōng, the rising-toned 董 dǒng, the departing-toned 送 sòng, and the entering-toned 屋 wū (which in Middle Chinese ended in -k, the entering tone counterpart of -ng).

Within each tone group are four rows known as děng (等 'class', 'grade' or 'group'), which Bernhard Karlgren translated as "divisions" while other linguists prefer "grades". They are usually denoted by Roman numerals I to IV. Their meaning remains the most controversial aspect of rime table phonology, but is believed to indicate palatalization (transcribed as the presence or absence of -j- or -i-), retroflex features, phonation, vowel quality (high vs. low or front vs. back) or some combination of these. Other scholars view them not as phonetic categories but formal devices exploiting distributional patterns in the Qieyun to achieve a compact presentation.

The symbol ○ indicates that that particular syllable does not occur.

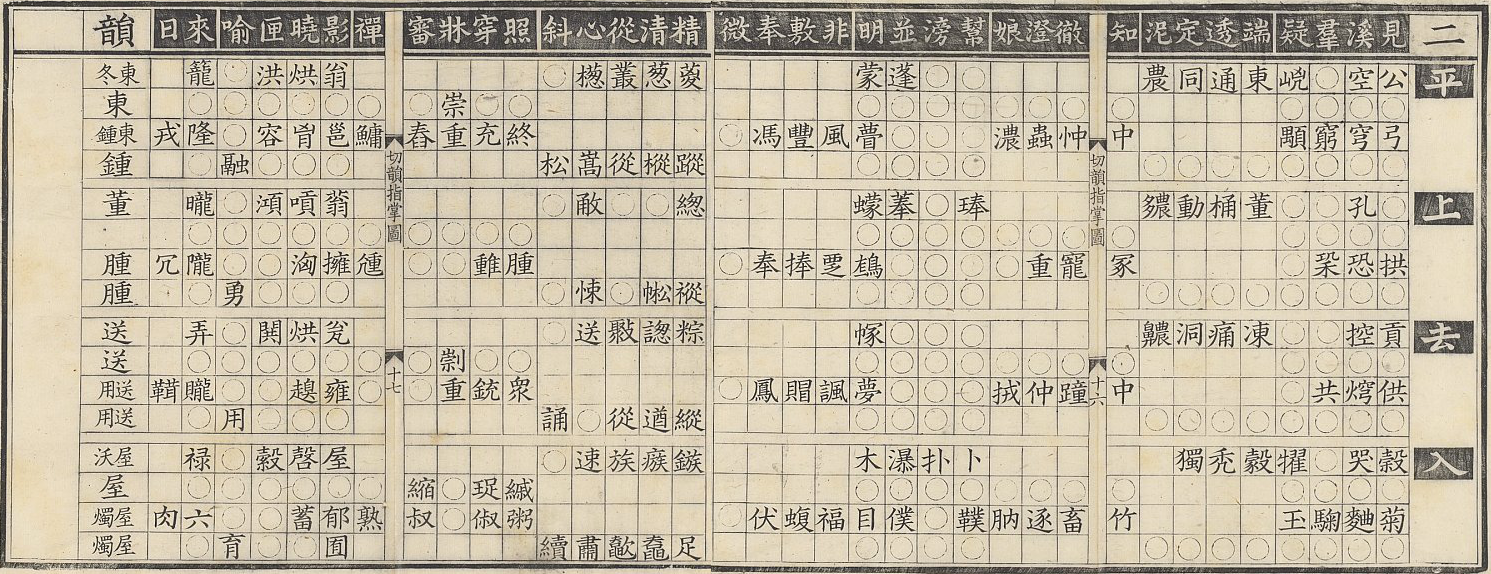
Table 2 of the Qieyun zhizhangtu, a merger of the first two tables (東 dōng and 冬 dōng rhymes) of the Yunjing

Bernard Karlgren noticed that classes of finals from the rime dictionaries were placed in different rows of the rime tables. As three classes of final occurred in the first, second and fourth rows respectively, he named them finals of divisions I, II and IV. The remaining finals he called "division-III finals" because they occurred in the third row of the tables. Some of these (the "pure" division-III finals) occurred only in that row, while others (the "mixed" finals) could also occur in the second or fourth rows with some initials.

Later workers noted that in the so-called chóngniǔ rhyme groups, 支 zhī, 脂 zhī, 祭 jì, 宵 xiāo, 鹽 yán, 侵 qīn, 仙 xiān and 真 zhēn, a consistent distinction within each rhyme group in the rime books is reflected in the rime tables by dividing the rhyme group between rows 2 and 4, often in adjacent tables. Li Rong, in a systematic comparison of the rhyme tables with a recently discovered early edition of the Qieyun, identified seven classes of finals. The table below lists the combinations of initial and final classes that occur in the Qieyun, with the row of the rime tables in which each combination was placed:

		div. I	div. II	"division-III" finals				div. IV
		div. I	div. II	indep.	mixed	chongniu		div. IV
Labials		1	2	3	3	3	4	4
Dental	stops	1						4
Retroflex	stops		2		3	3		
Lateral		1			3	3		4
Dental	sibilants	1			4	4		4
Palatal	sibilants				3	3		
Retroflex	sibilants		2		2	2		
Velars		1	2	3	3	3	4	4
Laryngeals		1	2	3	3	3	4	4

The mixed and chongniu finals, though designated as division-III finals, are spread across rows 2 and 4 as well as row 3 of the tables. To handle these cases, a distinction is made between the row that the homophone class is placed in and the "division" of its final. This article distinguishes rows by Arabic numerals 1 2 3 4 and divisions by Roman numerals I II III IV.

In addition, division-II and division-IV finals occur only in "outer" shè.

This distribution is the foundation of the compact tabular presentation of rime dictionary syllables. For example, the dental and retroflex stop initials are combined in a single group in a rime table, with the rows distinguishing the different Qieyun initials, and the three groups of sibilant initials are similarly combined. In a similar fashion different finals may occupy different rows of the same chart.

The Guangyun rhyme groups (here illustrated in the level tone, except where a group occurs only in the departing tone) are distributed across the 43 charts of the Yunjing and Qiyin lüe as follows:

shè 攝	LMC	Chart 轉		Division 等			
shè 攝	LMC	Open	Closed	I	II	III	IV
通 tōng (inner)	-əwŋ/k	1		東 dōng	東 dōng		
通 tōng (inner)	-əwŋ/k		2	冬 dōng	鍾 zhōng		
江 jiāng (outer)	-awŋ/k	3			江 jiāng		
止 zhǐ (inner)	-i	4	5		支 zhī		
止 zhǐ (inner)	-i	6	7		脂 zhī		
止 zhǐ (inner)	-i	8			之 zhī		
止 zhǐ (inner)	-i	9	10			微 wēi, 廢 fèi (Note: This departing tone rhyme group has no parallel in other tones, and was moved to the unused entering tone row of another table to save space.)	
遇 yù (inner)	-ǝ	11			魚 yú		
遇 yù (inner)	-ǝ		12	模 mú	虞 yú		
蟹 xiè (outer)	-aj	13		咍 hāi	皆 jiē, 夬 guài	祭 jì (Note: This departing tone rhyme group has no parallel in other tones.)	齊 qí
蟹 xiè (outer)	-aj		14	灰 huī	皆 jiē, 夬 guài	祭 jì	齊 qí
蟹 xiè (outer)	-aj	15	16	泰 jì	佳 jiā		祭 jì
臻 zhēn (outer)	-ən/t	17		痕 hén	臻 zhēn (Note: This division-III rhyme group occurs only in the level and entering tones, with 3 retroflex sibilant initials (which are placed in the second row of the tables). Many authors treat it as part of the 真 group.)	真 zhēn	真 zhēn
臻 zhēn (outer)	-ən/t		18	魂 hún	諄 zhūn		
臻 zhēn (outer)	-ən/t	19				欣 xīn	
臻 zhēn (outer)	-ən/t		20			文 wén	
山 shān (outer)	-an/t	21	22		山 shān	元 yuán	仙 xiān
山 shān (outer)	-an/t	23		寒 hán	刪 shān	仙 xiān	先 xiān
山 shān (outer)	-an/t		24	桓 huán	刪 shān	仙 xiān	先 xiān
效 xiào (outer)	-aw	25		豪 háo	肴 yáo	宵 xiāo	蕭 xiāo
效 xiào (outer)	-aw		26				宵 xiāo
果 guǒ (inner)	-a	27		歌 gē			
果 guǒ (inner)	-a		28	戈 hū		戈 hū	
假 jiǎ (outer)	-aː	29	30		麻 má	麻 má	
宕 dàng (inner)	-aŋ/k	31	32	唐 táng	陽 yáng		
梗 gěng (outer)	-ajŋ/k	33	34		庚 gēng	庚 gēng	清 qīng
梗 gěng (outer)	-ajŋ/k	35	36		耕 gēng	清 qīng	青 qīng
流 liú (inner)	-əw	37		侯 hóu	尤 yóu, 幽 yōu		
深 shēn (inner)	-əm/p		38		侵 qīn		
咸 xián (outer)	-am/p	39		覃 tán	咸 xián	鹽 yán	添 tiān
咸 xián (outer)	-am/p		40	談 tán	銜 xián	嚴 yán	鹽 yán
咸 xián (outer)	-am/p		41			凡 fán	
曾 zēng (inner)	-əŋ/k	42	43	登 dēng	蒸 zhēng		

In some cases, the Guangyun already reflected the open/closed distinction with separate rhyme groups, while in others they were included in the same group.

== Thirty-six initials ==
The earliest documentary records of the rime table tradition, the Dunhuang fragments, contain lists of 30 initials, each named after an exemplary character. This was later expanded to a standard set of 36 in the preface of the Yunjing, the major addition being a series of labiodental fricatives split from the labial series:

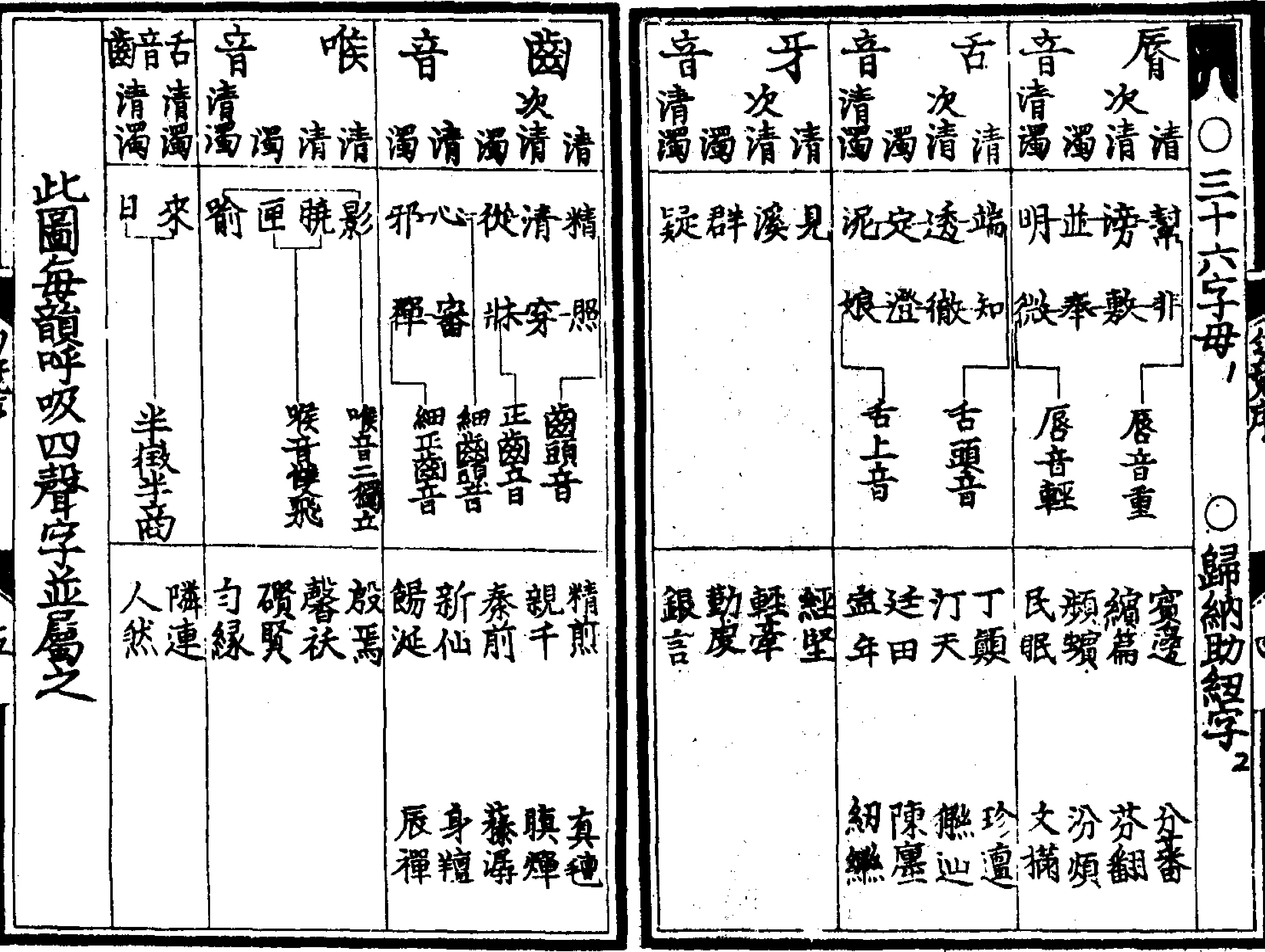

Tables of the Yunjing have only 23 columns, with one group of columns each for labials, coronals and sibilants, with the different types placed in different rows of the tables. Some later tables such as the Qieyun zhizhangtu have 36 columns, one for each of the 36 initials.

The 36 initials, with LMC values
		Tenuis 清	Aspirate 次清	Voiced 濁	Sonorant 清濁	Tenuis 清	Voiced 濁
Labials 脣	重唇音 "heavy lip"	幫 p-	滂 pʰ-	並 pɦ-	明 m-		
Labials 脣	輕唇音 "light lip" (Note: These initials were not included in the lists of 30 initials in the Dunhuang fragments.)	非 f-	敷 f- (Note: This initial was probably indistinguishable from 非 at the LMC stage, but was retained to record its origin from a different Qieyun initial. A distinction between [f] and [fʰ] would be unusual, but the two initials might have been distinguished at an earlier phase as affricates [pf] and [pfʰ].)	奉 fɦ-	微 ʋ- (Note: An unusual initial; shows up today as either [w], [v] (or [ʋ]), or [m].)		
Coronals 舌	舌頭音 "tongue-head"	端 t-	透 tʰ-	定 tɦ-	泥 n-		
Coronals 舌	舌上音 "tongue up"	知 tr-	徹 trʰ-	澄 trɦ-	娘 nr-		
Coronals 舌	半舌音 "half tongue"				來 l-		
Sibilants 齒	齒頭音 "tooth-head"	精 ts-	清 tsʰ-	從 tsɦ-		心 s-	邪 sɦ-
Sibilants 齒	正齒音 "true front-tooth" (Note: Two series of retroflex and palatal sibilants were distinguished in the Qieyun, but combined in the list of 36 initials. In the rime tables, retroflex sibilants are placed on the second row and palatal sibilants on the third.)	照 tʂ-	穿 tʂʰ-	牀 (t)ʂɦ- (Note: This initial was not included in the lists of 30 initials in the Dunhuang fragments, and was probably not phonemically distinct from 禪 ʂɦ by that time.)		審 ʂ-	禪 ʂɦ-
Sibilants 齒	半齒音 "half front-tooth"				日 r- (Note: Originally a palatal nasal; generally shows up today as [ʐ] (or [ɻ]), [ʑ], [j], [z], or [ɲ].)		
Velars 牙	牙音 "back-tooth"	見 k-	溪 kʰ-	群 kɦ-	疑 ŋ-		
Laryngeals 喉	喉音 "throat"	影 ʔ-			喻 ʜ-	曉 x-	匣 xɦ-

The 36 initials were so influential that it was not until 1842 that it was discovered (by Chen Li) that the initials of the Qieyun were slightly different.

There is some variation in the transcription of the initials 影 and 喻. The table above uses ⟨ʔ⟩ and ⟨ʜ⟩. Other conventions are ⟨ʼ⟩ vs nothing, ⟨ʼ⟩ vs ⟨ʼʼ⟩, and mid dot ⟨·⟩ (since Unicode 8.0, U+A78F ꞏ LATIN LETTER SINOLOGICAL DOT is also available for this purpose) vs ⟨ʼ⟩. These conventions carry over to other scripts of the Sinological tradition, such as ʼPhags-pa and Jurchen.
