= Toby Rimes =

Mythical poodle

Toby Rimes (sometimes spelled Tobey Rimes) is a mythical poodle with an estimated net worth of $92 million. It is allegedly descended from a poodle of the same name who was owned by New York City millionaire Ella Wendel in 1931. When Ella died, she allegedly left her dog an amount between $30 million to $80 million. All of that dog's descendants were supposedly named Toby Rimes and inherited the money. This story is an urban legend, although there was a real dog named Tobey.

The name "Toby Rimes" appeared in a March 15, 2004 London Mirror article by Dawn Knight. It contained a list of 20 of the world's richest pets. Toby Rimes was said by Knight to be a descendant of the original Toby who inherited 15 million pounds "from New York owner Ella Wendel." Since then numerous media outlets have repeated the story of Toby Rimes with embellishments. Some articles included a photo of a white poodle in sunglasses. The photo is actually a stock photo and is copyrighted by Eric Isselee.

The story of the inheritance dates back to at least 1933 when the New York correspondent of the London Daily Express incorrectly reported that "Toby" inherited 15 million pounds and the claim was picked up by newspapers around the world. "World's Richest Dog Dead" was the headline in the Australian newspaper, the Melbourne Argus.

In 1931 most American newspapers reported that Ella Wendel died leaving "Tobey" penniless. The Wilmington Morning News headline read, "$100,000,000 Willed; Wendel Dog Penniless." The article, via the Associated Press, stated "Tobey was the pet of Miss Ella Wendel, who died the other day and bequeathed more than $100,000,000 without mentioning the fluffy, fat Tobey, except by inference. The Society for the Prevention of Cruelty to Animals in New York was willed about $3,500,000 and a similar society in Massachusetts, $700,000."

According to New York city attorney Mervin Rosenman who viewed Ella Wendel's will and probate file for his book on the battle for the Wendel estate, Ella Wendel made "no designation of the person to care for him and no bequest of money for his support." A transcript of the will of Ella Wendel on Ancestry has no mention of Toby or Tobey but does mention "Five equal shares" for the "American Society for the Prevention of Cruelty to Animals" and "One equal share" for "The Massachusetts Society for the Prevention of Cruelty to Animals."

In 1933 Time magazine said that "Tobey, the last of a succession of 18 similarly-named French poodles, was not even mentioned in the will disposing of the late, eccentric Ella Virginia von Echtzel Wendel's $40,000,000 estate."

In 1951 Time published another article about "Tobey." They wrote, "Newsmen dubbed Tobey 'the richest dog in the world.' But, while Miss Wendel left an estate of $40 million, her will made no mention of Tobey....

"Last week the late, long-forgotten Tobey achieved new fame. Moscow Radio Commentator Berko told listeners about 'the little dog Tobey who lives in a very beautiful, richly decorated house, built by the best architects in the country . . . His mistress, a mad American woman, left it $75 million . . . The dog sleeps on a 'golden bed. It is attended by a staff of 45 servants and six lawyers." Moral for Moscow: 'While the millionaire dog lives in a beautiful private house, the children of the workers, dressed in tatters, roam the streets begging for a piece of bread. Like stray dogs, they sleep in the open . . . searching for food in the rubbish.'"

By 1985, Toby was mentioned in the Guinness Book of Pet Records. "The richest dog on record was a standard poodle named 'Toby', who was left the modern equivalent of £15 million in the will of his eccentric American owner, Miss Ella Wendel, who died in New York in 1931." Since then Toby was listed in multiple Guinness books as the "richest dog."

When the real Tobey died in 1933, his obituary was published in the New York Times.
