= Tongzhi (encyclopedia) =

1161 Chinese encyclopaedia by Zheng Qiao

- Author: Zheng Qiao
- Language: Classical Chinese
- Subject: general knowledge
- Publication date: 1161
- Publication place: Song dynasty

Tongzhi
- Chinese: 通志
Transcriptions
Standard Mandarin
- Hanyu Pinyin: Tōngzhì
- Wade–Giles: T'ung-chih

The Tongzhi ('Comprehensive records') is a Chinese general knowledge encyclopedia completed in 1161 by Zheng Qiao (鄭樵), a scholar during the Song dynasty. The work contains 200 chapters on diverse topics.

== Contents ==
A page from a Yuan dynasty printed edition of the Tongzhi

After the Tongdian, it was the second encyclopedia of the Santong ("The Three Encyclopedias"), which were often published together. It is also included second among the Shitong ("The Ten Encyclopedias"), compiled in the Qing dynasty. The Tongzhi became a model for most of the later encyclopedias.

Tongzhi is arranged in 200 volumes (juan), plus three volumes of notes. The historical information covers from earliest times to the end of the Tang dynasty. The contents include basic annals, yearly chronicles, hereditary houses, ranked biographies, and twenty monographs (lüe 略) on various topics, the last of which are considered the most original part. The twenty monographs, which comprise 52 volumes, deal with clans, the six classes of characters, phonetics, astronomy, geography, capital cities, rituals, posthumous names, vessels and robes, music, official titles, the examination system, punishment, food and money, arts and literature, collation, images, metal and stone, disasters and fortunes, insects and plants. The comprehensivity of these monographs has long been noted; the Annotated Bibliography of the Four Treasuries (completed in 1798) praised them in particular.

The chapter on images (Tu pu lüe 图谱略) has attracted considerable interest among art theorists. In this section, he gives images primacy in transmitting values, using metaphor that compares the images as the warp (jing 經) and the text as the weft (wei 緯).

The chapter on arts and literature (Yi wen lüe 藝文略) has the most detailed bibliographic scheme in pre-modern China.

== Modern editions ==
- Shanghai guji, 1993
- Zhonghua, 1995
- Zhejiang guji, 2007; this edition consist of 3,245 pages
