= Rhymes (surname) =

Rhymes is a surname. In Newfoundland, it may be a variant spelling of Reims, a city in France.

People with this surname include:

- Buster Rhymes (born 1962), American football player
- Will Rhymes (born 1983), American baseball player
- Raph Rhymes (born 1989), American baseball player
