= Rhyme dictionary =

Chinese dictionary encoding pronunciation

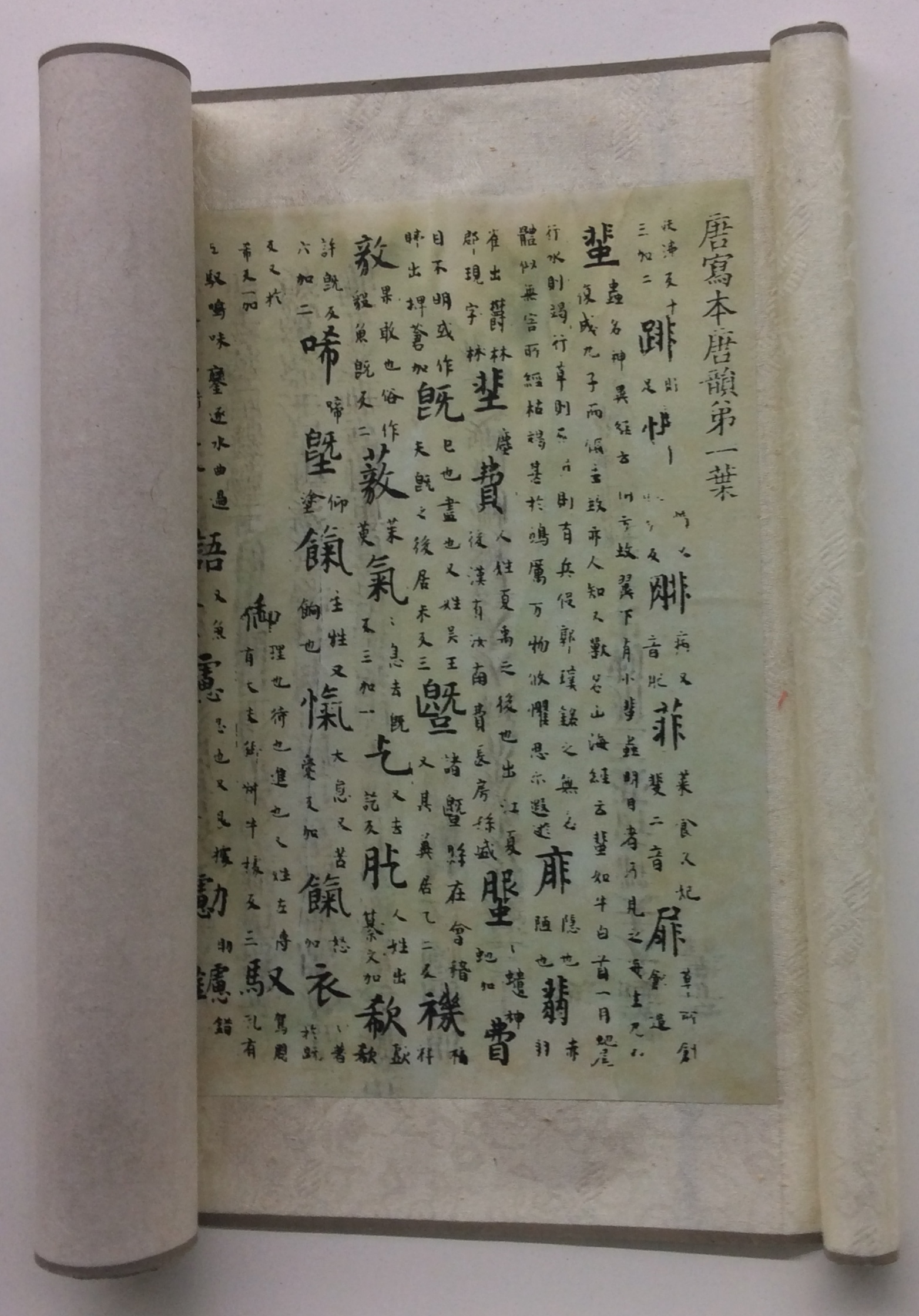
Copy of the Tangyun, an 8th-century edition of the Qieyun

A rime dictionary, rhyme dictionary, or rime book (traditional Chinese: 韻書; simplified Chinese: 韵书; pinyin: yùnshū) is a genre of dictionary that records pronunciations for Chinese characters by tone and rhyme, instead of by graphical means like their radicals. The most important rime dictionary tradition began with the Qieyun (601), which codified correct pronunciations for reading the classics and writing poetry by combining the reading traditions of north and south China. This work became very popular during the Tang dynasty, and went through a series of revisions and expansions, of which the most famous is the Guangyun (1007–1008).

These dictionaries specify the pronunciations of characters using the fanqie method, giving a pair of characters indicating the onset and remainder of the syllable respectively. The later rime tables gave a significantly more precise and systematic account of the sounds of these dictionaries by tabulating syllables by their onsets, rhyme groups, tones and other properties. The phonological system inferred from these books, often interpreted using the rime tables, is known as Middle Chinese, and has been the key datum for efforts to recover the sounds of early forms of Chinese. It incorporates most of the distinctions found in modern varieties of Chinese, as well as some that are no longer distinguished. It has also been used together with other evidence in the reconstructions of Old Chinese.

Some scholars use the French spelling rime, as used by the Swedish linguist Bernard Karlgren, for the categories described in these works, to distinguish them from the concept of poetic rhyme.

== Pronunciation guides ==
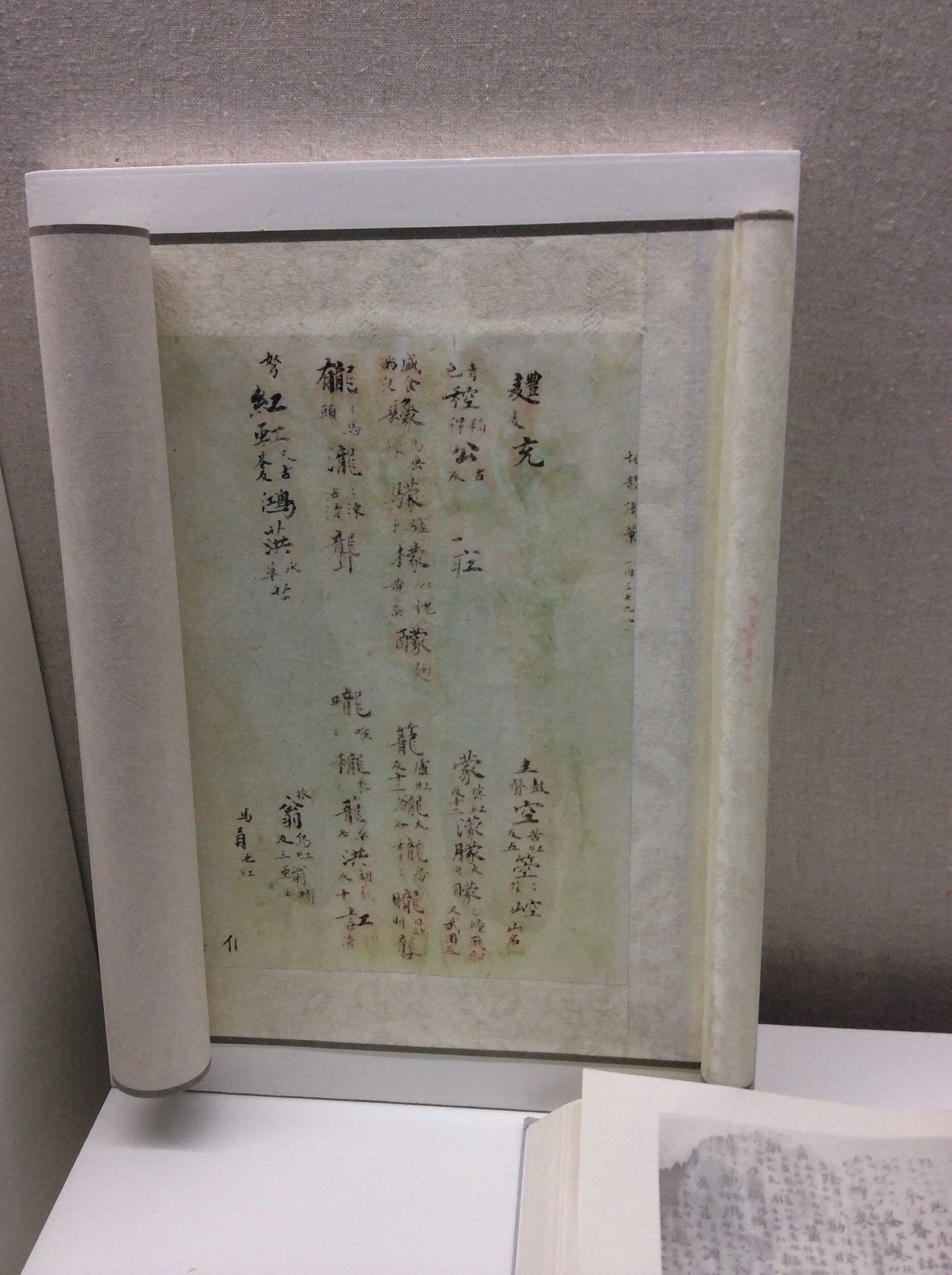
Copy of fragments of the Wang Renxu edition of the Qieyun

I have taken the sounds and the rhymes of the various specialists and the dictionaries of the ancients and moderns, and by arranging what those before me have recorded, I have made up the five volumes of the Qieyun. The splits and analyses are exceedingly fine and the distinctions abundant and profuse.

— Lu Fayan (601), Qieyun, preface translated by S. R. Ramsey

Chinese scholars produced dictionaries to codify reading pronunciations for the correct recitation of the classics and the associated rhyme conventions of regulated verse. The earliest rime dictionary was the Shenglei (lit. 'sound types') by Li Deng (李登) of the Three Kingdoms period, containing more than 11,000 characters grouped under the five notes of the ancient Chinese musical scale. The book did not survive, and is known only from descriptions in later works.

Various schools of the Jin dynasty and Northern and Southern dynasties produced their own dictionaries, which differed on many points. The most prestigious standards were those of the northern capital Luoyang and the southern capital Jinling (modern Nanjing). In 601, Lu Fayan (陸法言) published his Qieyun, an attempt to merge the distinctions in five earlier dictionaries. According to Lu Fayan's preface, the initial plan of the work was drawn up 20 years earlier in consultation with a group of scholars, three from southern China and five from the north. However the final compilation was by Lu alone, after he had retired from government service.

The Qieyun quickly became popular as the standard of cultivated pronunciation during the Tang dynasty. The dictionaries on which it was based fell out of use, and are no longer extant. Several revisions appeared, of which the most important were:

Major revisions of the Qieyun
Date	Compiler	Title
601	Lù Fǎyán 陸法言	Qièyùn 切韻
677	Zhǎngsūn Nèyán 長孫訥言	Qièyùn 切韻
706	Wáng Rénxū 王仁煦	Kānmiù bǔquē Qièyùn 刊謬補缺切韻 [Corrected and supplemented Qieyun]
720	Sūn Miǎn 孫愐	Tángyùn 唐韻
751	Sūn Miǎn 孫愐	Tángyùn 唐韻 (second edition)
763–84	Lǐ Zhōu 李舟	Qièyùn 切韻

In 1008, during the Song dynasty, a group of scholars commissioned by the emperor produced an expanded revision called the Guangyun. The Jiyun (1037) was a greatly expanded revision of the Guangyun. Lu's initial work was primarily a guide to pronunciation, with very brief glosses, but later editions included expanded definitions, making them useful as dictionaries.

Until the mid-20th century, the oldest complete rime dictionaries known were the Guangyun and Jiyun, though extant copies of the latter were marred by numerous transcription errors. Thus all studies of the Qieyun tradition were actually based on the Guangyun. Fragments of earlier revisions of the Qieyun were found early in the century among the Dunhuang manuscripts, in Turfan and in Beijing.

When the Qieyun became the national standard in the Tang dynasty, several copyists were engaged in producing manuscripts to meet the great demand for revisions of the work. Particularly prized were copies of Wang Renxu's edition, made in the early 9th century, by Wu Cailuan (呉彩鸞), a woman famed for her calligraphy. One of these copies was acquired by Emperor Huizong (1100–1126), himself a keen calligrapher. It remained in the palace library until 1926, when part of the library followed the deposed emperor Puyi to Tianjin and then to Changchun, capital of the puppet state of Manchukuo. After the Japanese surrender in 1945, it passed to a book dealer in Changchun, and in 1947 two scholars discovered it in a book market in Liulichang, Beijing. Studies of this almost complete copy have been published by the Chinese linguists Dong Tonghe (1948 and 1952) and Li Rong (1956).

== Structure ==
The Qieyun and its successors all had the same structure. The characters were first divided between the four tones. Because there were more characters of the 'level tone' (平聲 píngshēng), they occupied two juǎn (卷 'fascicle', 'scroll' or 'volume'), while the other three tones filled one volume each. The last category or 'entering tone' (入聲 rùshēng) consisted of words ending in stops -p, -t or -k, corresponding to words ending in nasals -m, -n and -ng in the other three tones. Today, these final stops are generally preserved in southern varieties of Chinese, but have disappeared in most northern ones, including the standard language.

Each tone was divided into rhyme groups (韻 yùn), traditionally named after the first character of the group, called the yùnmù (韻目 'rhyme eye'). Lu Fayan's edition had 193 rhyme groups, which were expanded to 195 by Zhangsun Nayan and then to 206 by Li Zhou. The following shows the beginning of the first rhyme group of the Guangyun, with first character 東 ('east'):

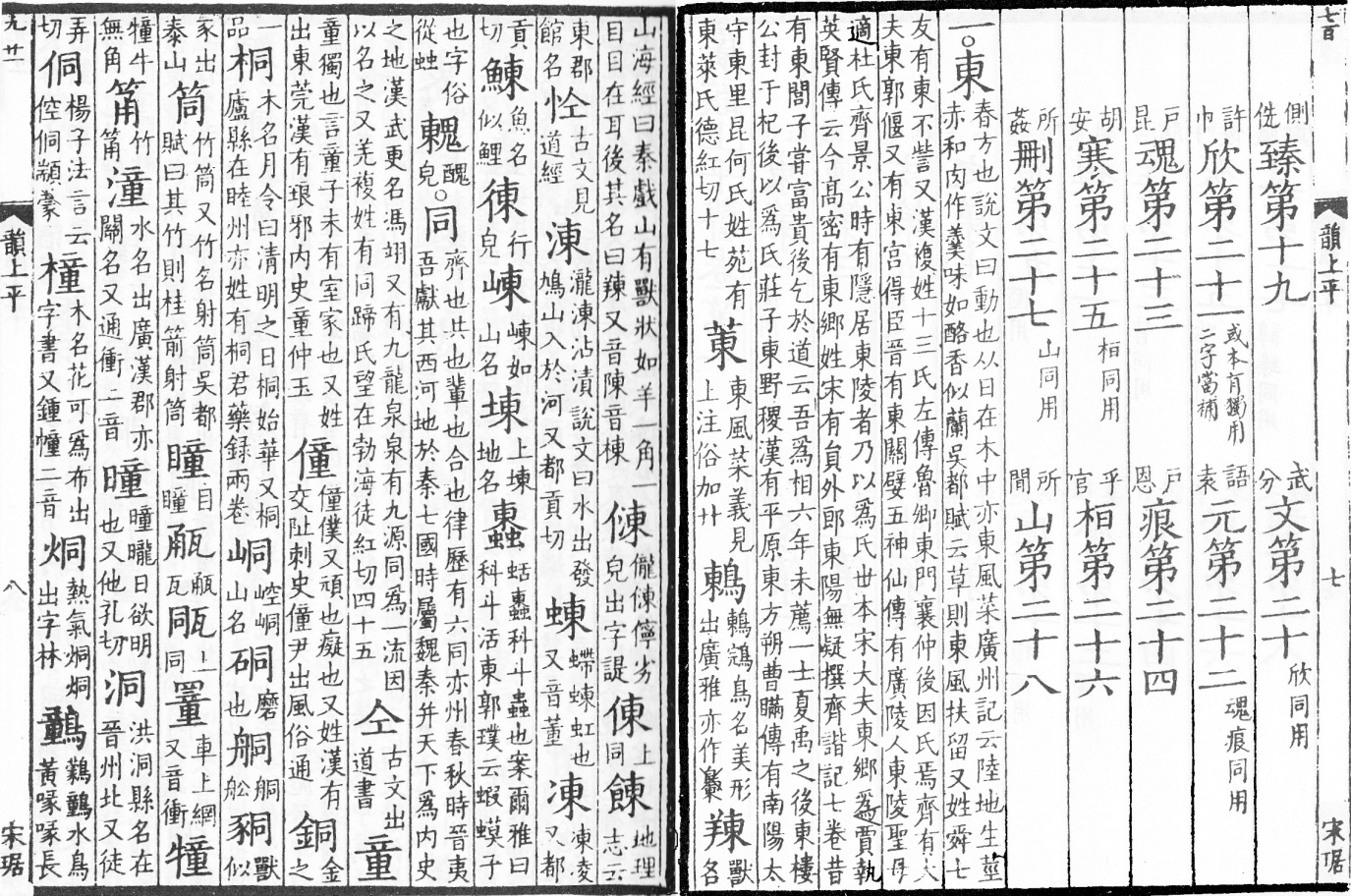

Each rhyme group was subdivided into homophone groups preceded by a small circle called a niǔ (紐 'button'). The entry for each character gave a brief explanation of its meaning. At the end of the entry for the first character of a homophone group was a description of its pronunciation, given by a fǎnqiè formula, a pair of characters indicating the initial (聲母 shēngmǔ) and final (韻母 yùnmǔ) respectively. For example, the pronunciation of 東 was described using the characters 德 tok and 紅 huwng indicating t + uwng = tuwng. (Note: Middle Chinese transcriptions are given in Baxter's system.) The formula was followed by the character 反 fǎn (in the Qieyun) or the character 切 qiè (in the Guangyun), followed by the number of homophonous characters. In the above sample, this formula is followed by the number 十七, indicating that there are 17 entries, including 東, with the same pronunciation.

The order of the rhyme groups within each volume does not seem to follow any rule, except that similar groups were placed together, and corresponding groups in different tones were usually placed in the same order. Where two rhyme groups were similar, there was a tendency to choose exemplary words with the same initial. The table of contents of the Guangyun marks adjacent rhyme groups as tóngyòng (同用), meaning they could rhyme in regulated verse. In the above sample, under the entry for the rhyme group 刪 in the last part the table of contents (on the right page) is the notation "山同用", indicating that this group could rhyme with the following group 山.

The following are the rhyme groups of the Guangyun with their modern names, the finals they include (see next section), and the broad rhyme groups (shè 攝) they were assigned to in the rime tables. A few entries are re-ordered to place corresponding rhyme groups of different tones in the same row, and darker lines separate the tóngyòng groups:

Rhyme groups of the Guangyun and corresponding finals
Rhyme groups by tone				Finals by distribution class				shè 攝
平 level (Note: The Middle Chinese level tone regularly becomes the first or second tone of Modern Chinese, depending on the Middle Chinese initial.)	上 rising (Note: The Middle Chinese rising tone regularly becomes the third or fourth tone of Modern Chinese, depending on the Middle Chinese initial.)	去 departing (Note: The Middle Chinese departing tone regularly becomes the fourth tone of Modern Chinese.)	入 entering (Note: The Middle Chinese entering tone described words ending in a stop -p, -t or -k, corresponding to nasal endings -m, -n and -ng in the other three tones. These final stops have disappeared in northern dialects, including the standard language, with the words distributed among the four modern tones.)	I/IV	II	mixed	pure III	shè 攝
1-1. 東 dōng	3-1. 董 dǒng	4-1. 送 sòng	5-1. 屋 wū	-uwng/k		-juwng/k		通 tōng
1-2. 冬 dōng	(Note: Instead of being placed in their own rhyme group, the few rising tone words in -owng are included in the 腫 zhǒng group, with special annotations.)	4-2. 宋 sòng	5-2. 沃 wò	-owng/k				通 tōng
1-3. 鍾 zhōng	3-2. 腫 zhǒng	4-3. 用 yòng	5-3. 燭 zhú			-jowng/k		通 tōng
1-4. 江 jiāng	3-3. 講 jiǎng	4-4. 絳 jiàng	5-4. 覺 jué		-æwng/k			江 jiāng
1-5. 支 zhī	3-4. 紙 zhǐ	4-5. 寘 zhì				-j(w)(i)e		止 zhǐ
1-6. 脂 zhī	3-5. 旨 zhǐ	4-6. 至 zhì				-(j)(w)ij		止 zhǐ
1-7. 之 zhī	3-6. 止 zhǐ	4-7. 志 zhì				-i		止 zhǐ
1-8. 微 wēi	3-7. 尾 wěi	4-8. 未 wèi					-j(w)ɨj	止 zhǐ
1-9. 魚 yú	3-8. 語 yǔ	4-9. 御 yù				-jo		遇 yù
1-10. 虞 yú	3-9. 麌 yǔ	4-10. 遇 yù				-ju		遇 yù
1-11. 模 mú	3-10. 姥 mǔ	4-11. 暮 mù		-u				遇 yù
1-12. 齊 qí	3-11. 薺 jì	4-12. 霽 jì		-(w)ej				蟹 xiè
		4-13. 祭 jì				-j(w)(i)ejH		蟹 xiè
		4-14. 泰 tài		-(w)ajH				蟹 xiè
1-13. 佳 jiā	3-12. 蟹 xiè	4-15. 卦 guà			-(w)ɛɨ			蟹 xiè
1-14. 皆 jiē	3-13. 駭 hài	4-16. 怪 guài			-(w)ɛj			蟹 xiè
		4-17. 夬 guài			-(w)æjH			蟹 xiè
1-15. 灰 huī	3-14. 賄 huì	4-18. 隊 duì		-woj				蟹 xiè
1-16. 咍 hāi	3-15. 海 hǎi	4-19. 代 dài		-oj				蟹 xiè
		4-20. 廢 fèi					-j(w)ojH	蟹 xiè
1-17. 真 zhēn	3-16. 軫 zhěn	4-21. 震 zhèn	5-5. 質 zhì			-(j)in/t		臻 zhēn
1-18. 諄 zhūn (Note: This group was added in the Lǐ Zhōu revision of 763–784 by splitting off syllables with a medial glide /w/ from the previous rhyme group.)	3-17. 準 zhǔn	4-22. 稕 zhùn	5-6. 術 shù			-(j)win/t		臻 zhēn
1-19. 臻 zhēn (Note: This final occurs only after retroflex sibilants, and is in complementary distribution with 真.)			5-7. 櫛 zhì (Note: This final occurs only after retroflex sibilants, and is in complementary distribution with 質.)			-in/t		臻 zhēn
1-20. 文 wén	3-18. 吻 wěn	4-23. 問 wèn	5-8. 物 wù				-jun/t	臻 zhēn
1-21. 欣 xīn (Note: In the Qieyun this rhyme group is named 殷 yīn.)	3-19. 隱 yǐn	4-24. 焮 xìn	5-9. 迄 qì				-jɨn/t	臻 zhēn
1-22. 元 yuán	3-20. 阮 ruǎn	4-25. 願 yuàn	5-10. 月 yuè				-j(w)on/t	(to 山)
1-23. 魂 hún	3-21. 混 hùn	4-26. 慁 hùn	5-11. 沒 mò	-won/t				(to 臻)
1-24. 痕 hén	3-22. 很 hěn	4-27. 恨 hèn	(Note: Instead of being placed in their own rhyme group, the few words in -ot are included in the 沒 mò group, with special annotations.)	-on				(to 臻)
1-25. 寒 hán	3-23. 旱 hàn	4-28. 翰 hàn	5-12. 曷 hé	-an/t				山 shān
1-26. 桓 huán	3-24. 緩 huǎn	4-29. 換 huàn	5-13. 末 mò	-wan/t				山 shān
1-27. 刪 shān	3-25. 潸 shān (Note: This character had readings in both level and rising tones in medieval times, but only the level tone reading is represented in the modern language.)	4-30. 諫 jiàn	5-15. 鎋 xiá		-(w)æn/t			山 shān
1-28. 山 shān	3-26. 產 chǎn	4-31. 襉 jiàn	5-14. 黠 xiá		-(w)ɛn/t			山 shān
2-1. 先 xiān	3-27. 銑 xiǎn	4-32. 霰 xiàn	5-16. 屑 xiè	-(w)en/t				山 shān
2-2. 仙 xiān	3-28. 獮 xiǎn	4-33. 線 xiàn	5-17. 薛 xuē			-j(w)(i)en/t		山 shān
2-3. 蕭 xiāo	3-29. 篠 xiǎo	4-34. 嘯 xiào		-ew				效 xiào
2-4. 宵 xiāo	3-30. 小 xiǎo	4-35. 笑 xiào				-j(i)ew		效 xiào
2-5. 肴 yáo	3-31. 巧 qiǎo	4-36. 效 xiào			-æw			效 xiào
2-6. 豪 háo	3-32. 晧 hào	4-37. 號 hào (Note: In the Qieyun this rhyme group is named 号 hào.)		-aw				效 xiào
2-7. 歌 gē	3-33. 哿 gě	4-38. 箇 gè		-a		-ja (Note: The few finals in -ja and -jwa are of late date.)		果 guǒ
2-8. 戈 hū	3-34. 果 guǒ	4-39. 過 guò		-wa		-jwa		果 guǒ
2-9. 麻 má	3-35. 馬 mǎ	4-40. 禡 mà			-(w)æ	-jæ (Note: This final occurs only with dental sibilant and palatal initials.)		假 jiǎ
2-10. 陽 yáng	3-36. 養 yǎng	4-41. 漾 yàng	5-18. 藥 yào			-j(w)ang/k		宕 dàng
2-11. 唐 táng	3-37. 蕩 dàng	4-42. 宕 dàng	5-19. 鐸 duó	-(w)ang/k				宕 dàng
2-12. 庚 gēng	3-38. 梗 gěng	4-43. 映 yìng	5-20. 陌 mò		-(w)æng/k		-j(w)æng/k	梗 gěng
2-13. 耕 gēng	3-39. 耿 gěng	4-44. 諍 zhèng	5-21. 麥 mài		-(w)ɛng/k			梗 gěng
2-14. 清 qīng	3-40. 靜 jìng	4-45. 勁 jìng	5-22. 昔 xī			-j(w)ieng/k		梗 gěng
2-15. 青 qīng	3-41. 迥 jiǒng	4-46. 徑 jìng	5-23. 錫 xī	-(w)eng				梗 gěng
2-16. 蒸 zhēng	3-42. 拯 zhěng	4-47. 證 zhèng	5-24. 職 zhí			-(w)ing/k		曾 zēng
2-17. 登 dēng	3-43. 等 děng	4-48. 嶝 dèng	5-25. 德 dé	-(w)ong/k				曾 zēng
2-18. 尤 yóu	3-44. 有 yǒu	4-49. 宥 yòu				-juw		流 liú
2-19. 侯 hóu	3-45. 厚 hòu	4-50. 候 hòu		-uw				流 liú
2-20. 幽 yōu	3-46. 黝 yǒu	4-51. 幼 yòu					-jiw	流 liú
2-21. 侵 qīn	3-47. 寑 qǐn (Note: In the Qieyun this rhyme group is named 寢 qǐn.)	4-52. 沁 qìn	5-26. 緝 qì			-(j)im/p		深 shēn
2-22. 覃 tán	3-48. 感 gǎn	4-53. 勘 kàn	5-27. 合 hé	-om/p				咸 xián
2-23. 談 tán	3-49. 敢 gǎn	4-54. 闞 kàn	5-28. 盍 hé	-am/p				咸 xián
2-24. 鹽 yán	3-50. 琰 yǎn	4-55. 豔 yàn	5-29. 葉 yè			-j(i)em/p		咸 xián
2-25. 添 tiān	3-51. 忝 tiǎn	4-56. 㮇 tiàn	5-30. 怗 tiē	-em/p				咸 xián
2-26. 咸 xián	3-53. 豏 xiàn	4-58. 陷 xiàn	5-31. 洽 qià		-ɛm/p			咸 xián
2-27. 銜 xián	3-54. 檻 kǎn	4-59. 鑑 jiàn	5-32. 狎 xiá		-æm/p			咸 xián
2-28. 嚴 yán	3-52. 儼 yǎn (Note: These rhyme groups were added in the Zhǎngsūn Nèyán revision of 677 by splitting off syllables without a medial glide /w/ from the following rhyme groups, consistent with the treatment of the level and entering tones.)	4-57. 釅 yàn	5-33. 業 yè				-jæm/p	咸 xián
2-29. 凡 fán	3-55. 范 fàn	4-60. 梵 fàn	5-34. 乏 fá				-jom/p	咸 xián

== Phonological system ==
The rime dictionaries have been intensively studied as important sources on the phonology of medieval Chinese, and the system they reveal has been dubbed Middle Chinese. Since the Qieyun itself was believed lost until the mid-20th century, most of this work was based on the Guangyun.

The books exhaustively list the syllables and give pronunciations, but do not describe the phonology of the language. This was first attempted in the rime tables, the oldest of which date from the Song dynasty, but which may represent a tradition going back to the late Tang dynasty. Though not quite a phonemic analysis, these tables analysed the syllables of the rime books using lists of initials, finals and other features of the syllable. The initials are further analysed in terms of place and manner of articulation, suggesting inspiration from Indian linguistics, at that time the most advanced in the world. However the rime tables were compiled some centuries after the Qieyun, and many of its distinctions would have been obscure. Edwin Pulleyblank treats the rime tables as describing a Late Middle Chinese stage, in contrast to the Early Middle Chinese of the rime dictionaries.

=== Structural analysis ===
In his Qièyùn kǎo (1842), the Cantonese scholar Chen Li set out to identify the initial and final categories underlying the fanqie spellings in the Guangyun. The system was clearly not minimal, employing 452 characters as initial spellers and around 1200 as final spellers. However, no character could be used as a speller for itself. Thus, for example,

- 東 was spelled 德 + 紅.
- 德 was spelled 多 + 特.
- 多 was spelled 德 + 河.

This implies that 東, 德 and 多 must all have had the same initial. By following such chains of equivalences Chen, was able to identify sets of equivalent initial spellers, and similarly for the finals. More common segments tended to have the most variants. Words with the same final would rhyme, but a rhyme group might include between one and four finals with different medial glides, as seen in the above table of rhyme groups. The inventory of initials Chen obtained resembled the 36 initials of the rime tables, but with significant differences. In particular the "light lip sounds" and "heavy lip sounds" of the rime tables were not distinguished in the fanqie, while each of the "proper tooth sounds" corresponded to two distinct fanqie initial categories.

Unaware of Chen's work, the Swedish linguist Bernard Karlgren repeated the analysis identifying the initials and finals in the 1910s. The initials could be divided into two broad types: grave initials (labials, velars and laryngeals), which combine with all finals, and acute initials (the others), with more restricted distribution. Like Chen, Karlgren noted that in syllables with grave initials, the finals fell into two broad types, now usually referred to (following Edwin Pulleyblank) as types A and B. He also noted that these types could be further subdivided into four classes of finals distinguished by the initials with which they could combine. These classes partially correspond to the four rows or "divisions", traditionally numbered I–IV, of the later rime tables. The observed combinations of initials and finals are as follows:

Co-occurrence of classes of initials and finals in the Qieyun
			Initial class									Rows of the rime tables
			grave	acute						grave		Rows of the rime tables
			Labial	Dental	Lateral	Retroflex stop	Dental sibilant	Retroflex sibilant	Palatal	Velar	Laryngeal	Rows of the rime tables
Final class	Type A	I/IV (Note: This class is further subdivided in the rime tables between divisions I and IV, but finals of the two subtypes have identical distributions in the Qieyun.)	yes	yes	yes		yes			yes	yes	1, 4
Final class	Type A	II	yes			yes		yes		yes	yes	2
Final class	Type B	mixed	yes		yes	yes	yes	yes	yes	yes	yes	2–4
Final class	Type B	pure III	yes							yes	yes	3

Some of the "mixed" finals are actually pairs of type B finals after grave initials, with two distinct homophone groups for each initial, but a single final after acute initials. These pairs, known as chongniu, are also marked in the rime tables by splitting them between rows 3 and 4, but their interpretation remains uncertain. There is also no consensus regarding which final of the pair should be identified with the single final occurring after acute initials.

=== Reconstructed sound values ===
Karlgren also sought to determine the phonetic values of the abstract categories yielded by the formal analysis, by comparing the categories of the Guangyun with other types of evidence, each of which presented their own problems. The Song dynasty rime tables applied a sophisticated featural analysis to the rime books, but were separated from them by centuries of sound change, and some of their categories are difficult to interpret. The so-called Sino-Xenic pronunciations, readings of Chinese loanwords in Vietnamese, Korean and Japanese, were ancient, but affected by the different phonological structures of those languages. Finally modern varieties of Chinese provided a wealth of evidence, but often influenced each other as a result of a millennium of migration and political upheavals. After applying a variant of the comparative method in a subsidiary role to flesh out the rime dictionary evidence, Karlgren believed that he had reconstructed the speech of the Sui-Tang capital Chang'an. Later workers have refined Karlgren's reconstruction.

Initials of the Qieyun system with their traditional names and approximate values
		Labial (Note: The rhyme tables describe a later stage in which labiodental fricatives were also distinguished.)	Dental (Note: It is not clear whether these had an alveolar or dental articulation. They are mostly alveolar in modern Chinese varieties.)	Lateral	Retroflex stop	Dental sibilant	Retroflex sibilant	Palatal (Note: The retroflex and palatal sibilants were treated as a single series in the later rhyme tables.)	Velar	Laryngeal (Note: The point of articulation of the fricatives is not clear, and varies between the modern varieties.)
Stop or affricate	voiceless	幫 [p]	端 [t]		知 [ʈ]	精 [ts]	莊 [tʂ]	章 [tɕ]	見 [k]	影 [ʔ]
Stop or affricate	aspirate	滂 [pʰ]	透 [tʰ]		徹 [ʈʰ]	清 [tsʰ]	初 [tʂʰ]	昌 [tɕʰ]	溪 [kʰ]	
Stop or affricate	voiced	並 [b]	定 [d]		澄 [ɖ]	從 [dz]	崇 [dʐ]	禪 [dʑ] (Note: The initials 禪 and 船 are reversed from their positions in the rhyme tables, which are believed to have confused them.)	群 [ɡ]	
Nasal		明 [m]	泥 [n]		娘 [ɳ]			日 [ɲ]	疑 [ŋ]	
Fricative	voiceless					心 [s]	生 [ʂ]	書 [ɕ]		曉 [x]
Fricative	voiced					邪 [z]	俟 [ʐ] (Note: The zr- initial occurs in only two words 俟 and 漦 in the Qieyun, and is merged with dzr- in the later Guangyun. It is omitted in many reconstructions, and has no standard Chinese name.)	船 [ʑ]		匣/云 [ɣ] (Note: In the rhyme tables, the palatal allophone of h- (云) is combined with y- (以) as a single initial 喻.)
Approximant				來 [l]				以 [j]		

In most cases, the simpler inventories of initials of modern varieties of Chinese can be treated as varying developments of the Qieyun initials. The voicing distinction is retained in Wu Chinese dialects, but has disappeared from other varieties. Except in the Min Chinese dialects, a labiodental series has split from the labial series, a development already reflected in the Song dynasty rime tables. The retroflex and palatal sibilants had also merged by that time. In Min dialects the retroflex stops have merged with the dental stops, while elsewhere they have merged with the retroflex sibilants. In the south these have also merged with the dental sibilants, but the distinction is maintained in most Mandarin Chinese dialects. The palatal series of modern Mandarin dialects, resulting from a merger of palatal allophones of dental sibilants and velars, is a much more recent development.

Assigning phonetic values to the finals has proved more difficult, as many of the distinctions reflected in the Qieyun have been lost over time. Karlgren proposed that type B finals contained a palatal medial /j/, a position that is still accepted by most scholars. However Pulleyblank, noting the use of these syllables in the transcription of foreign words without such a medial, claims the medial developed later. A labiovelar medial /w/ is also widely accepted, with some syllables having both medials. The codas are believed to reflect those of many modern varieties, namely the glides /j/ and /w/, nasals /m/, /n/ and /ŋ/ and corresponding stops /p/, /t/ and /k/. Some authors argue that the placement of the first four rhyme groups in the Qieyun suggests that they had distinct codas, reconstructed as labiovelars /ŋʷ/ and /kʷ/. Most reconstructions posit a large number of vowels to distinguish the many Qieyun rhyme classes that occur with some codas, but the number and the values assigned vary widely.

The Chinese linguist Li Rong published a study of the early edition of the Qieyun found in 1947, showing that the expanded dictionaries had preserved the phonological structure of the Qieyun intact, except for a merger of initials /dʐ/ and /ʐ/. For example, although the number of rhyme groups increased from 193 in the earlier dictionary to 206 in the Guangyun, the differences are limited to splitting rhyme groups based on the presence or absence of a medial glide /w/.

However the preface of the recovered Qieyun suggests that it represented a compromise between northern and southern reading pronunciations. (Note: For translations of the Qieyun preface, see Baxter (1992), pp. 35–36 and Ramsey (1989), pp. 116–117.) Most linguists now believe that no single dialect contained all the distinctions recorded, but that each distinction did occur somewhere. For example, the Qieyun distinguished three rhyme groups 支, 脂 and 之 (all pronounced zhī in modern Chinese), although 支 and 脂 were not distinguished in parts of the north, while 脂 and 之 rhymed in the south. The three groups are treated as tongyong in the Guangyun and have merged in all modern varieties. Although Karlgren's identification of the Qieyun system with a Sui-Tang standard is no longer accepted, the fact that it contains more distinctions than any single contemporary form of speech means that it retains more information about earlier stages of the language, and is a major component in the reconstruction of Old Chinese phonology.

== Pingshui rhyme categories ==
From early in the Tang dynasty, candidates in the imperial examination were required to compose poetry and rhymed prose in conformance with the rhyme categories of the Qieyun. However, the fine distinctions made by the Qieyun were found overly restrictive by poets, and Xu Jingzong and others suggested more relaxed rhyming rules. The Píngshuǐ (平水) system of 106 rhyme groups, first codified during the Jin dynasty, eventually became the prescribed system for the imperial examination. It became the standard for official rhyme books, and was also used as the classification system for such reference works as the Peiwen Yunfu.

The Píngshuǐ rhyme groups are the same as the tóngyòng groups of the Guangyun, with a few exceptions:

- The 廢 fèi group is merged with 隊 duì.
- The rising and departing tone groups corresponding to 蒸 zhēng were merged into the 迥 jiǒng and 徑 jìng groups.
- The groups 嚴 yán and 凡 fán, which were tóngyòng in the Guangyun, and in complementary distribution, were split between the two preceding tóngyòng groups.

Pingshui rhyme groups by tone
平 level	上 rising	去 departing	入 entering
東 dōng	董 dǒng	送 sòng	屋 wū
冬 dōng	腫 zhǒng	宋 sòng	沃 wò
江 jiāng	講 jiǎng	絳 jiàng	覺 jué
支 zhī	紙 zhǐ	寘 zhì	
微 wēi	尾 wěi	未 wèi	
魚 yú	語 yǔ	御 yù	
虞 yú	麌 yǔ	遇 yù	
齊 qí	薺 jì	霽 jì	
		泰 tài	
佳 jiā	蟹 xiè	卦 guà	
灰 huī	賄 huì	隊 duì	
真 zhēn	軫 zhěn	震 zhèn	質 zhì
文 wén	吻 wěn	問 wèn	物 wù
元 yuán	阮 ruǎn	願 yuàn	月 yuè
寒 hán	旱 hàn	翰 hàn	曷 hé
刪 shān	潸 shān	諫 jiàn	鎋 xiá
先 xiān	銑 xiǎn	霰 xiàn	屑 xiè
蕭 xiāo	篠 xiǎo	嘯 xiào	
肴 yáo	巧 qiǎo	效 xiào	
豪 háo	晧 hào	號 hào	
歌 gē	哿 gě	箇 gè	
麻 má	馬 mǎ	禡 mà	
陽 yáng	養 yǎng	漾 yàng	藥 yào
庚 gēng	梗 gěng	映 yìng	陌 mò
青 qīng	迥 jiǒng	徑 jìng	錫 xī
蒸 zhēng			職 zhí
尤 yóu	有 yǒu	宥 yòu	
侵 qīn	寑 qǐn	沁 qìn	緝 qì
覃 tán	感 gǎn	勘 kàn	合 hé
鹽 yán	琰 yǎn	豔 yàn	葉 yè
咸 xián	豏 xiàn	陷 xiàn	洽 qià

Yan Zhengqing's Yunhai jingyuan (c. 780) was the first rime dictionary of multisyllabic words rather than single characters. Though no longer extant, it served as the model for a series of encyclopedic dictionaries of literary words and phrases organized by Píngshuǐ rhyme groups, culminating in the Peiwen Yunfu (1711).

== Vernacular dictionaries ==
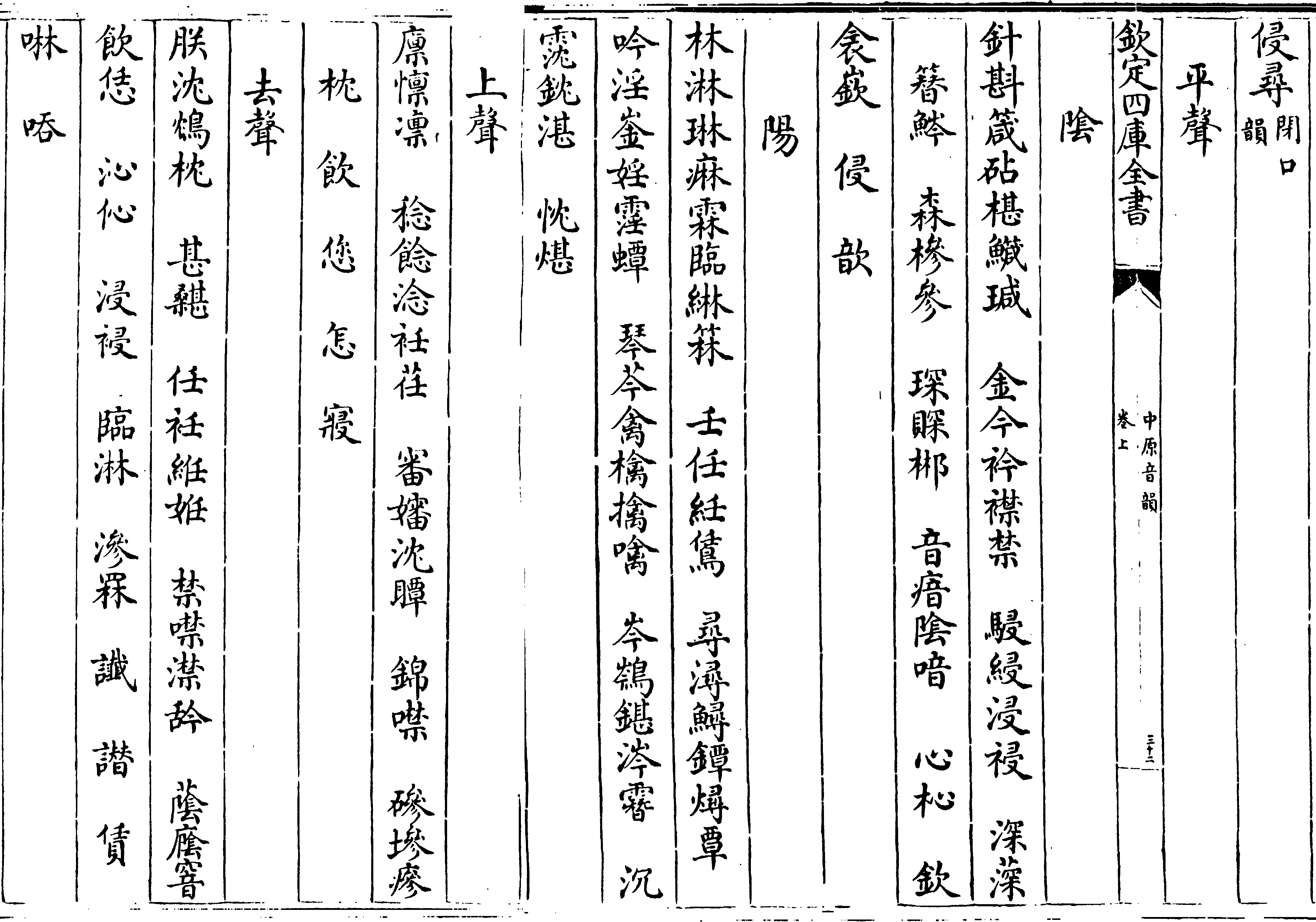
Zhongyuan Yinyun rhyme group 侵尋 (-im, -əm), divided into four tones

A side-effect of foreign rule of northern China between the 10th and 14th centuries was a weakening of many of the old traditions. New genres of vernacular literature such as the qu and sanqu poetry appeared, as well as the Zhongyuan Yinyun, created by Zhōu Déqīng (周德清) in 1324 as a guide to the rhyming conventions of qu. The Zhongyuan Yinyun was a radical departure from the rhyme table tradition, with the entries grouped into 19 rhyme classes each identified by a pair of exemplary characters. These rhyme classes combined rhymes from different tones, whose parallelism was implicit in the ordered of the Guangyun rhymes. The rhyme classes are subdivided by tone and then into groups of homophones, with no other indication of pronunciation. The dictionary reflects contemporaneous northern speech, with the even tone divided in upper and lower tones, and the loss of the Middle Chinese final stops. Such syllables, formerly grouped in the entering tone, are distributed between the other tones, but placed after the other syllables with labels such as 入聲作去聲 (rùshēng zuò qùshēng 'entering tone makes departing tone').

The early Ming dictionary Yùnluè yìtōng (韻略易通) by Lan Mao was based on the Zhongyuan Yinyun, but arranged the homophone groups according to a fixed order of initials, which were listed in a mnemonic poem in the ci form. However, there could still be multiple homophone groups under a given rhyme group, tone and initial, as medial glides were not considered part of the rhyme. Further innovations are found in a rime dictionary from the late 16th century describing the Fuzhou dialect, which is preserved, together with a later redaction, in the Qi Lin Bayin. This work enumerates the finals of the dialect, differentiated by both medial and rhyme, and classifies each homophone group uniquely by final, initial and tone. Both finals and initials are listed in cí poems.

== Tangut ==
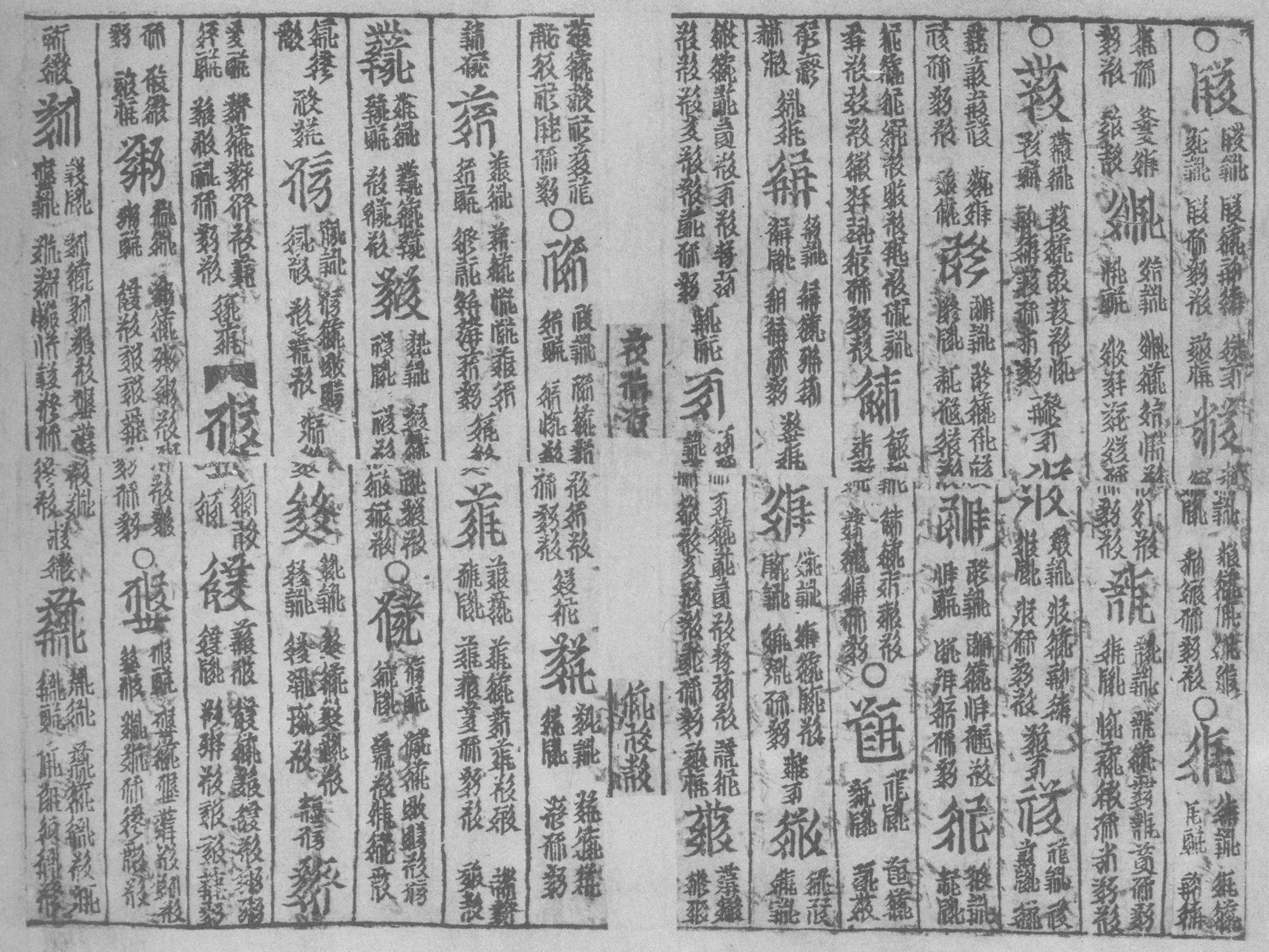
Sea of Characters, level tone folio 53

Tangut was the language of the Western Xia state (1038–1227), centred on the area of modern Gansu. The language had been extinct for four centuries when an extensive corpus of documents in the logographic Tangut script were discovered in the early 20th century. One of the sources used to reconstruct the Tangut language is the Sea of Characters (Chinese: 文海; pinyin: Wénhǎi), a rhyme dictionary written entirely in Tangut, but with the same structure as the Chinese dictionaries. The dictionary consists of one volume each for the Tangut level and rising tones, with a third volume of "mixed category" characters, whose significance is unclear. As with the Chinese dictionaries, each volume is divided into rhymes, and then into homophone groups separated by a small circle. The pronunciation of the first Tangut character in each homophone group is given by a fanqie formula using a pair of Tangut characters. Mikhail Sofronov applied Chen Li's method to these fanqie to construct the system of Tangut initials and finals.

== See also ==
- Kangxi Dictionary
