= Old Chinese phonology =

Scholars have attempted to reconstruct the phonology of Old Chinese from documentary evidence. Although the writing system does not describe sounds directly, shared phonetic components of the most ancient Chinese characters are believed to link words that were pronounced similarly at that time. The oldest surviving Chinese verse, in the Classic of Poetry (Shijing), shows which words rhymed in that period. Scholars have compared these bodies of contemporary evidence with the much later Middle Chinese reading pronunciations listed in the Qieyun rhyme dictionary published in 601 AD, though this falls short of a phonemic analysis. Supplementary evidence has been drawn from cognates in other Sino-Tibetan languages and in Min Chinese, which split off before the Middle Chinese period, Chinese transcriptions of foreign names, and early borrowings from and by neighbouring languages such as Hmong–Mien, Kra-Dai and Vietic languages.

Although many details are disputed, most recent reconstructions agree on the basic structure. It is generally agreed that Old Chinese differed from Middle Chinese in lacking retroflex and palatal obstruents but having initial consonant clusters of some sort, and in having voiceless sonorants. Most recent reconstructions also posit consonant clusters at the end of the syllable, developing into tone distinctions in Middle Chinese.

== Overview ==
Most scholars believe that Old Chinese morphemes were overwhelmingly monosyllabic, though some have recently suggested that a minority of them had minor presyllables (but were still written with a single character).

Although many details of the sound system are still disputed, recent formulations are in substantial agreement on the core issues. For example, a recent synthesis gives the following inventory of initial consonants:

Old Chinese initial consonants
		Labial	Dental		Velar		Uvular	
		Labial	plain	sibilant	plain	labialized	plain	labialized
Stop or affricate	voiceless	*p	*t	*ts	*k	*kʷ	*q	*qʷ
Stop or affricate	aspirate	*pʰ	*tʰ	*tsʰ	*kʰ	*kʷʰ	*qʰ	*qʷʰ
Stop or affricate	voiced	*b	*d	*dz	*ɡ	*ɡʷ	*ɢ	*ɢʷ
Nasal	voiceless	*m̥	*n̥		*ŋ̊	*ŋ̊ʷ		
Nasal	voiced	*m	*n		*ŋ	*ŋʷ		
Lateral	voiceless		*l̥					
Lateral	voiced		*l					
Fricative or approximant	voiceless		*r̥	*s				
Fricative or approximant	voiced		*r					

Uvular stops are a relatively recent proposal, replacing *ʔ, *h, *ɦ and their labialized counterparts, and are not accepted by all authors. Baxter and Sagart reconstruct uvular stops together with *ʔ and *ʔʷ.

Most scholars also reconstruct several initial consonant clusters. In most reconstructions since the 1990s, an Old Chinese syllable also has

- some representation of the distinction between Middle Chinese "type-A" and "type-B" syllables, for example type A having pharyngealized initial consonants or long vowels (see § Type A/B distinction),
- an optional medial *-r- (or sometimes *-l-),
- one of six vowels:

*i	*ə	*u
*e	*a	*o

- an optional coda, which could be a glide *-j or *-w, a nasal *-m, *-n or *-ŋ, or a stop *-p, *-t, *-k or *-kʷ (with some authors also including *-r),
- an optional post-coda *-ʔ or *-s.

In such systems, Old Chinese, unlike later forms of Chinese, has no tones. The rising and departing tones of Middle Chinese are treated as reflexes of the Old Chinese post-codas.

== Sources ==
=== Phonological system of the Qieyun ===
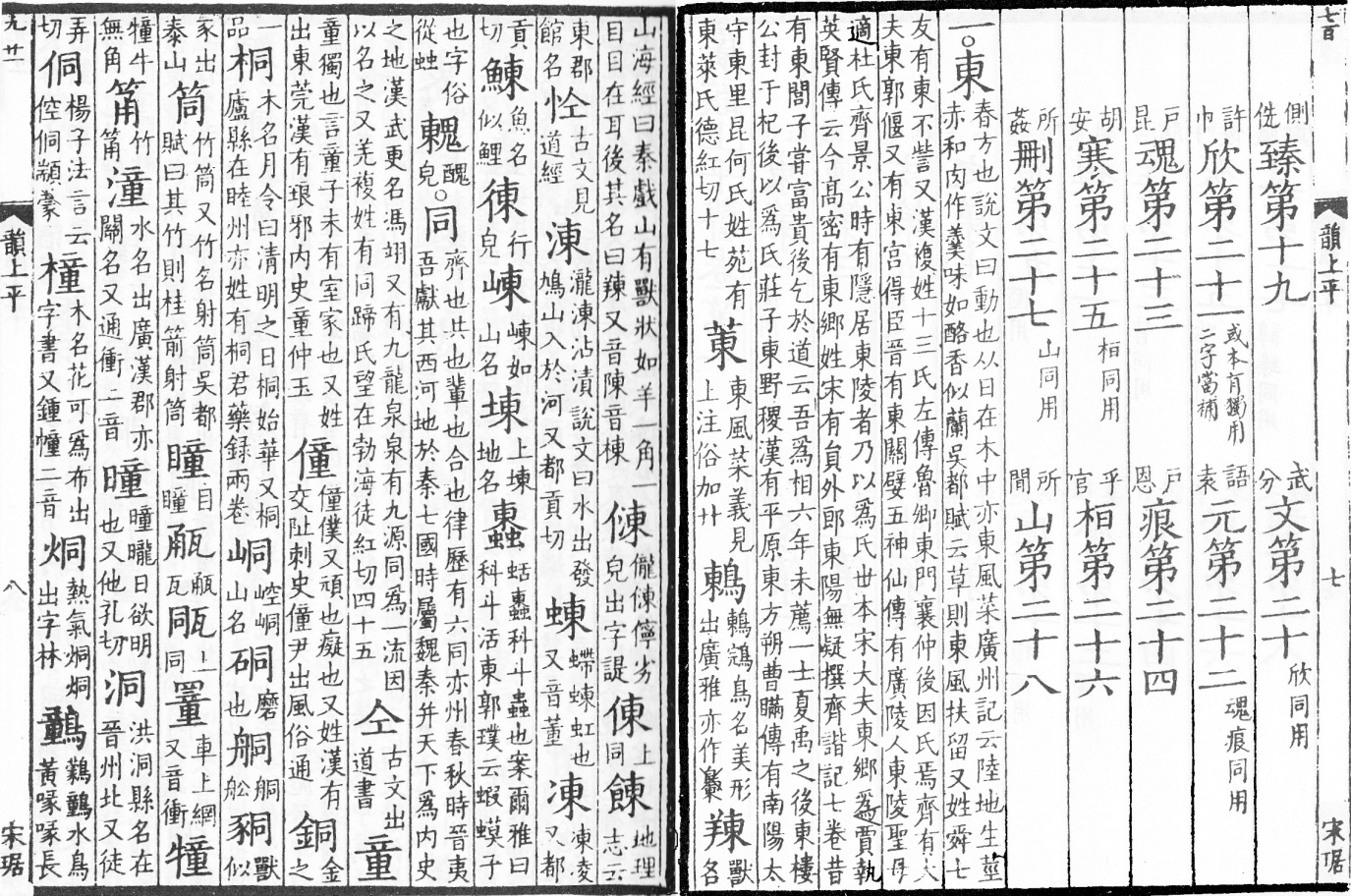
Part of the Guangyun, an 11th-century revision of the Qieyun

The reconstruction of Old Chinese typically starts from "Early Middle Chinese", the phonological system of the Qieyun, a rhyme dictionary published in 601, with many revisions and expansions over the following centuries. According to its preface, the Qieyun did not record a single contemporary dialect, but set out to codify the pronunciations of characters to be used when reading the classics, incorporating distinctions made in different parts of China at the time (a diasystem).

The Qieyun and its successors grouped characters by tone class, rhyme group and homophone group. The pronunciation of each group of homophonous characters was indicated using the fanqie method, using a pair of other words with the same initial consonant and final (the rest of the syllable) respectively. Analysis of the fanqie spellings allows one to enumerate the initials and finals of the system, but not to determine their phonetic values.

The rhyme tables from the Song dynasty classify the syllables of the Qieyun using a sophisticated feature analysis of the initials and finals, though influenced by the different pronunciations of that later period. Scholars have attempted to determine the phonetic content of the initials and finals by comparing them with the rhyme tables and by examining pronunciations in modern varieties and loans in Japanese, Korean and Vietnamese (the Sinoxenic materials), but many details regarding the finals are still uncertain.

=== Phonetic elements of the script ===
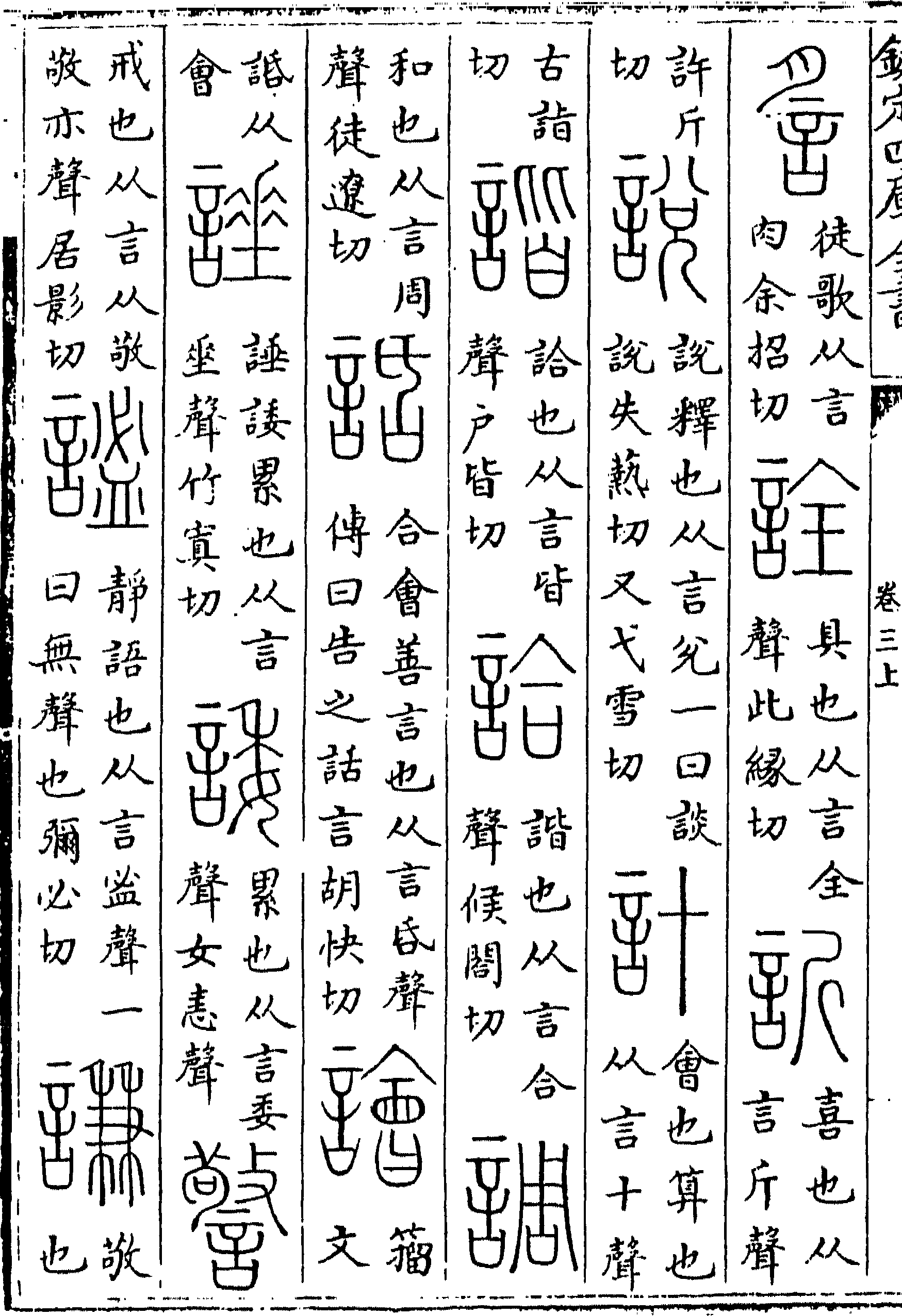
Page from a copy of a Song dynasty edition of the Shuowen Jiezi, showing characters with the 言 element

Each character of the script represented a single Old Chinese morpheme, originally identical to a word. The system does not use symbols for individual sounds as is done in an alphabetic system. However, while a minority of words are represented pictorially, most are written by borrowing characters for similar-sounding words. Often a disambiguating semantic indicator element was added to the phonetic element, yielding a phono-semantic compound. Often words written with a shared phonetic element are still pronounced alike, as in the word zhōng ('middle', 中), whose character was adapted to write the words chōng ('pour', 沖) and zhōng ('loyal', 忠). In other cases words sharing a phonetic element have very different sounds in any known variety of Chinese, but are assumed to have been similar in sound at the time the characters were chosen.

The first systematic study of the structure of Chinese characters was the Shuowen Jiezi (100 AD) written by Xu Shen. The Shuowen was mostly based on the small seal script standardized in the Qin dynasty. Earlier characters from oracle bones and Zhou bronze inscriptions often reveal relationships that were obscured in later forms. However, these brief and formulaic texts used only a small part of the lexicon. Since the late 20th century, several caches of bamboo and wooden slips from the Warring States period have been recovered, especially from the states of Chu and Qin. These texts feature considerable variation in the characters used to represent a word. The study of these variants can clarify both the pronunciations of individual words and also which phonetic elements were considered interchangeable.

=== Poetic rhyming ===
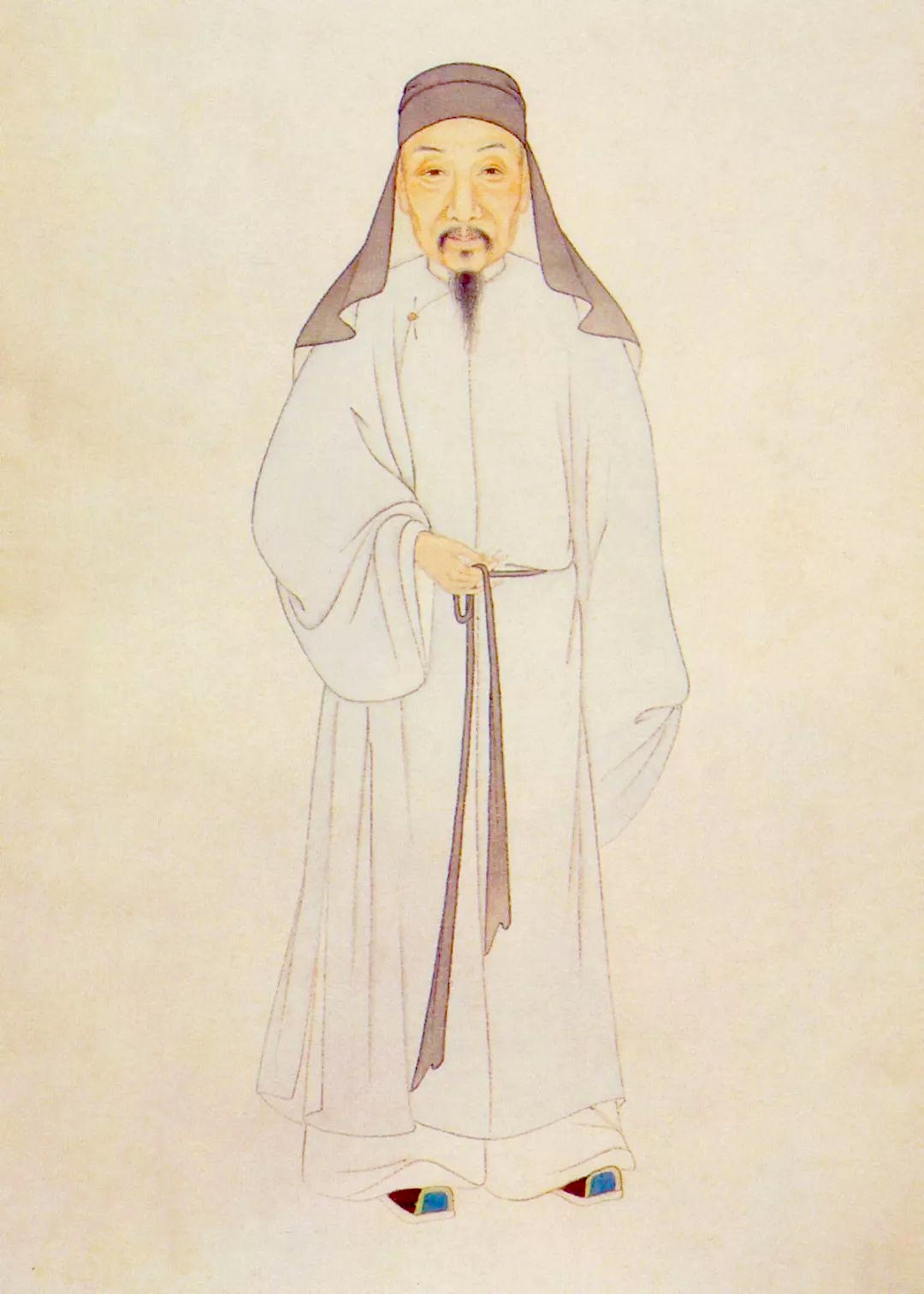
Gu Yanwu, who began the systematic study of Shijing rhymes

The other large body of contemporaneous evidence is rhyme in ancient texts. Most work has focussed on the Shijing, a collection of songs and poetry from the 11th to 7th centuries BC. Again some of these songs still rhyme in modern varieties of Chinese, but many do not. For many centuries, this was attributed to lax rhyming practice or varied pronunciations. The puzzle was solved by the late-Ming dynasty scholar Chen Di, who demonstrated that rhyming practice was consistent within the Shijing. Observing that language varied between places, he postulated that sounds changed over time, explaining the discrepancy.

The systematic study of Old Chinese rhymes began in the 17th century, when Gu Yanwu divided the rhyming words of the Shijing into ten rhyme groups (yùnbù 韻部). These groups were subsequently refined by other scholars, culminating in a standard set of 31 in the 1930s. One of these scholars, Duan Yucai, stated the important principle that characters in the same phonetic series would be in the same rhyme group, (Note: 同聲必同部 Tóng shēng bì tóng bù.) making it possible to assign almost all words to rhyme groups.

=== Modern Chinese varieties ===
Modern Min dialects, particularly those of northwest Fujian, show reflexes of distinctions not reflected in Middle Chinese. For example, the following dental initials have been identified in reconstructed proto-Min:

	Voiceless stops			Voiced stops			Nasals		Laterals	
Example word	單	轉	炭	直	長	頭	南	年	來	老
Proto-Min initial	*t	*-t	*th	*d	*-d	*dh	*n	*nh	*l	*lh
Middle Chinese initial	t		th	d			n		l	

Other points of articulation show similar distinctions within stops and nasals. Proto-Min voicing is inferred from the development of Min tones, but the phonetic values of the initials are otherwise uncertain. The sounds indicated as *-t, *-d, etc. are known as "softened stops" due to their reflexes in Jianyang and nearby Min varieties in northwestern Fujian, where they appear as fricatives or approximants (e.g. [v l h] < *-p *-t *-k in Jianyang) or are missing entirely, while the non-softened variants appear as stops. Evidence from early loans into Mienic languages suggests that the softened stops were prenasalized. The distinction among resonants is also reflected in some Hakka varieties.

The Waxiang dialects of western Hunan differ strongly from other Chinese varieties, preserving several distinctions and features not found in the Qieyun.

=== Other evidence ===
Several early texts contain transcriptions of foreign names and terms using Chinese characters for their phonetic values. Of particular importance are the many Buddhist transcriptions of the Eastern Han period, because the native pronunciation of the source languages, such as Sanskrit and Pali, is known in detail. Commentaries on the classics from the same period contain many remarks on the pronunciations of particular words, which has yielded a great deal of information on the pronunciations and even dialectal variation of Eastern Han Chinese.

Many students of Chinese have noted "word families", groups of words with related meanings and variant pronunciations, sometimes written using the same character. One common case is "derivation by tone change", in which words in the departing tone appear to be derived from words in other tones. Another alternation involves transitive verbs with an unvoiced initial and passive or stative verbs with a voiced initial, though scholars are divided on which form is basic.

Old Chinese interacted with neighbouring languages, some of whose relatives, particularly Austroasiatic, Kra–Dai and Miao–Yao languages, are still spoken today. The earliest borrowings in both directions provide further evidence of Old Chinese sounds, though complicated by uncertainty about the reconstruction of early forms of those languages.

== Structure of the Qieyun system ==
In the rhyme table tradition, initials were classified by place and manner of articulation. The initials of the Qieyun are slightly different from the rhyme tables, but are generally agreed and each traditionally named with an exemplary word as follows:

Initials of Early Middle Chinese with traditional names and Baxter's notation (Note: The additional letters -r-, -y- and -h- indicate retroflexion, palatalization or aspiration of the preceding consonant, rather than separate segments.)
		Labial (Note: The rhyme tables describe a later stage in which labiodental fricatives were also distinguished.)	Dental (Note: It is not clear whether these had an alveolar or dental articulation. They are mostly alveolar in modern Chinese varieties.)	Retroflex stop	Dental sibilant	Retroflex sibilant	Palatal (Note: The retroflex and palatal sibilants were treated as a single series in the later rhyme tables.)	Velar	Laryngeal (Note: The point of articulation of the fricatives is not clear, and varies between the modern varieties.)
Stop or affricate	voiceless	幫 p-	端 t-	知 tr-	精 ts-	莊 tsr-	章 tsy-	見 k-	影 ʔ-
Stop or affricate	aspirate	滂 ph-	透 th-	徹 trh-	清 tsh-	初 tsrh-	昌 tsyh-	溪 kh-	
Stop or affricate	voiced	並 b-	定 d-	澄 dr-	從 dz-	崇 dzr-	禪 dzy- (Note: The initials 禪 and 船 are reversed from their positions in the rhyme tables, which are believed to have confused them.)	群 g-	
Nasal		明 m-	泥 n-	娘 nr-			日 ny-	疑 ng-	
Fricative	voiceless				心 s-	生 sr-	書 sy-		曉 x-
Fricative	voiced				邪 z-	俟 zr- (Note: The zr- initial occurs in only two words 俟 and 漦 in the Qieyun, and is merged with dzr- in the later Guangyun. It is omitted in many reconstructions, and has no standard Chinese name.)	船 zy-		匣/云 h- (Note: In the rhyme tables, the palatal allophone of h- (云) is combined with y- (以) as a single initial 喻.)
Approximant			來 l-				以 y-		

As many potential combinations of initial and final did not occur, the designers of the rhyme tables saved space by separating finals with different patterns of co-occurrence, effectively identifying cases of complementary distribution. Thus finals are split between divisions (等 děng) named I, II, III and IV based on the rows of the rhyme tables in which they were placed. Most scholars believe that finals of divisions I and IV contained low back and mid front vowels respectively, while Division II has a front lax vowel. Division III is usually taken as indicating a palatal medial -j- in Middle Chinese.

Division III finals occur in more than half of the syllables of the Qieyun. Some authors call them type B finals, with type A encompassing all the other divisions. Comparing placement in the rhyme tables with distribution in the Qieyun, Li Rong subdivided division III finals into four distributional classes, which others have called pure (or independent), mixed and two kinds called chongniu. Some of the distinctions between the resulting seven classes are found only in the rhyme tables. When considering the Qieyun only, they reduce to four distinct patterns of co-occurrence with initials at various places of articulation:

Co-occurrence of classes of Qieyun initials and finals, with example syllables corresponding to the Shijing 陽 yáng rhyme class
Qieyun final type		Qieyun initial type							
Qieyun final type		Labial	Dental	Retroflex stop	Dental sibilant	Retroflex sibilant	Palatal	Velar	Laryngeal
Type A	Divisions I and IV	pang	tang		tsang			kang	ʔang
Type A	Division II	paeng		traeng		tsraeng		kaeng	ʔaeng
Type B (div. III)	Pure and chongniu-4	pjang						kjang	ʔjang
Type B (div. III)	Mixed and chongniu-3	pjaeng		trjaeng	tsjaeng	tsrjaeng	tsyaeng	kjaeng	ʔjaeng

The rhyme tables also classified Qieyun finals as either 'open' (開 kāi) or 'closed' (合 hé), with the latter believed to indicate a medial -w- or lip rounding. The Middle Chinese -w- medial was unevenly distributed, being distinctive only after velar and laryngeal initials or before certain finals with codas -j, -n or -t.

== Initials ==
The primary sources of evidence for the reconstruction of the Old Chinese initials are medieval rhyme dictionaries and phonetic clues in the Chinese script.

Early in the 20th century, Huang Kan proposed that the division I and IV finals, and the initials with which they occurred, namely labials, dentals, dental sibilants, velars and laryngeals, were primitive.

=== Principles of phonetic series ===
A key principle, first proposed by the Swedish sinologist Bernhard Karlgren, holds that the initials of words written with the same phonetic component had a common point of articulation in Old Chinese. In 1940, Karlgren published the first complete reconstruction of Old Chinese in a dictionary called the Grammata Serica, in which characters are arranged by phonetic series within rhyme groups. The 1957 revision Grammata Serica Recensa (GSR) remains a standard reference, even though Karlgren's reconstructions have been superseded by the work of later scholars.

The uneven distribution of the Middle Chinese medial -w- is taken (following André-Georges Haudricourt and Sergei Yakhontov) to indicate that Old Chinese had labialized variants of the back initials but no labiovelar medial. The plain and labialized consonants are generally kept separate in phonetic series. The remaining occurrences of Middle Chinese -w- are believed to result from breaking of a back vowel before these codas (see § Vowels).

Major types of phonetic series and Qieyun initials found in them
p-	t-	tr-	tsy-	ts-	tsr-	k-	ʔ-	kw-	ʔw-
ph-	th-	trh-	tsyh-	tsh-	tsrh-	kh-		khw-	
b-	d-	dr-	dzy-	dz-	dzr-	g-		gw-	
			sy-	s-	sr-		x-		xw-
			zy-	z-	zr-		h-		hw-
			y-						
m-	n-	nr-	ny-			ng-		ngw-	
	l-								

For example, since Middle Chinese dentals, retroflex stops and palatals, which are in complementary distribution, occur together in phonetic series, they are traced to a single Old Chinese dental series, *t-, *tʰ-, *d- and *n-, with the retroflex stops conditioned by an Old Chinese medial *-r- and the palatals conditioned by type B finals. The Qing philologist Qian Daxin had already discovered, by studying sound glosses given by Eastern Han authors, that the Middle Chinese dental and retroflex stop series were not distinguished at that time.

The Middle Chinese dental sibilants and retroflex sibilants are also in complementary distribution and occur together in phonetic series. They may be similarly traced to a single Old Chinese sibilant series, *ts-, *tsʰ-, *dz-, *s- and (for some authors) *z-, with the retroflex sibilants conditioned by the Old Chinese medial *-r-. The Middle Chinese initials z- and zr- have restricted distributions, and many authors prefer to derive them from clusters instead of reconstructing Old Chinese *z-.

As Middle Chinese g- occurs only in palatal environments (type B syllables), Li attempted to derive both g- and h- from Old Chinese *ɡ-, but had to assume irregular developments in some cases. Li Rong showed that several words with Middle Chinese initial h- were distinguished in modern Min dialects. For example, 厚 'thick' and 後 'after' were both huwX in Middle Chinese, but have velar and zero initials respectively in several Min dialects. Most authors now assume that Middle Chinese g- and h- are derived from separate Old Chinese initials, which merged in type A syllables.

The traditional view has been to project the Middle Chinese laryngeals back to Old Chinese glottal stop *ʔ- and fricatives *h- and *ɦ-, with labialized counterparts *ʔʷ-, *hʷ- and *w-. To account for the fact that Middle Chinese laryngeals are found in phonetic series with velars, Pan Wuyun proposed that these Old Chinese initials were actually uvular stops *q-, *qʰ- and *ɢ-, and labio-uvular stops *qʷ-, *qʷʰ- and *ɢʷ-.

=== Palatalization ===
However, there are several cases where quite different Middle Chinese initials appear together in a phonetic series. Karlgren and subsequent workers have proposed either additional Old Chinese consonants or initial consonant clusters in such cases. For example, the Middle Chinese palatal sibilants appear in two distinct kinds of series, with dentals and with velars: (Note: Middle Chinese forms are given in Baxter's notation.)

- 周 tsyuw (< *t-, type B) 'cycle; Zhou dynasty', 彫 tew (< *t-, type A) 'carve' and 調 dew (< *d-, type A) 'adjust'
- 制 tsyejH (< *k-, type B) 'cut out' and 猘 kjejH (< *kr-, type B) 'mad dog'

It is thought that Old Chinese dentals in type B syllables were palatalized, unless the medial *-r- was present. Some Old Chinese velars were also palatalized in type B syllables, but the conditioning factors are only partly understood. Li proposed *Kr- as the source of palatal initials occurring in phonetic series with velars or laryngeals, found no evidence for *Pr-, and attributed the chóngniǔ distinction to the vowel. Following proposals by Pulleyblank, Baxter explained chóngniǔ using *-r- and postulated that plain velars and laryngeals were palatalized in type B syllables with a front vowel, except when *-r-) was present. However, a significant number of palatalizations are not explained by this rule.

=== Liquids ===
Similarly, it is proposed that the *-r- medial could occur after labials and velars, complementing the instances proposed as sources of Middle Chinese retroflex dentals and sibilants, to account for such connections as: (Note: Karlgren originally postulated Old Chinese consonant clusters with *-l- in such cases.)

- 筆 pit (< *pr-, type A) 'writing pencil' and 律 lwit (< *br-, type A) 'law; rule'
- 監 kaem (< *kr-, type A) 'look at' and 藍 lam (< *ɡr-, type A) 'indigo'

Thus the Middle Chinese lateral l- is believed to reflect Old Chinese *-r-. Old Chinese voiced and voiceless laterals *l- and *l̥- are proposed to account for a different group of series, mixing palatals with d- and th- (but not t-), such as

- 脫 dwat (< *l-, type A) and thwat (< *l̥-, type A) 'peel off', 悅 ywet (< *l-, type B) 'pleased' and 說 sywet (< OC *l̥-, type B) 'speak' (Note: Originally proposed as voiced and voiceless fricative initials in Pulleyblank (1962a), pp. 114–119.)

The divergent Waxiang dialect of western Hunan has a lateral initial in many of these words. This treatment of the Old Chinese liquids is further supported by Tibeto-Burman cognates and by transcription evidence. For example, the name "Alexandria" (referring to one of many cities so named) was transcribed in the Book of Han chapter 96A as ⟨烏弋山離⟩, Middle Chinese ʔu-yik-srean-lje, in which the initials y- and l- correspond to earlier *l and *r respectively.

=== Other incongruous series ===
Voiceless nasal initials *m̥-, *n̥- and *ŋ̊- are proposed (following Dong Tonghe and Edwin Pulleyblank) in series such as:

- 墨 mok 'ink' and 黑 xok (< *m̥-) 'black'
- 難 nan 'difficult' and 灘 than (< *n̥-) 'foreshore'
- 虐 ngjak 'cruel' and 謔 xjak (< *ŋ̊-) 'to ridicule'

Clusters *sn- and so on are proposed (following Karlgren) for alternations of Middle Chinese nasals and s- such as

- 如 nyo (< *n-, type B) 'resemble' and 絮 sjoH (< *sn-, type B) 'raw silk'

Other cluster initials, including *s with stops or stops with *l, have been suggested but their existence and nature remains an open question.

=== Proto-Min initials ===
Proto-Min *nh and *lh are distinct from the Old Chinese initials *n̥ and *l̥, which both yield Middle Chinese th (or sy in palatal environments). The distinctions found in Proto-Min initials are assumed by most workers to date from the Old Chinese period, but they are not reflected in the widely accepted inventory of Old Chinese initials given above. The Old Chinese antecedents of these distinctions are not yet agreed, with researchers proposing a variety of consonant clusters. Baxter and Sagart derive the additional aspirated initials from consonant clusters and the softened stops from minor syllables.

== Type A/B distinction ==
Although all authors agree that the difference between type A and B syllables reflects a real Old Chinese phonological distinction of some sort, there is no agreement on its phonetic form. The traditional approach was to project the Middle Chinese palatal medial -j- back to a medial *-j- in Old Chinese, but many recent authors argue that the absence or presence of the Middle Chinese medial reflects something different in Old Chinese. Evidence includes the use of type B syllables to transcribe foreign words lacking any such medial, the lack of the medial in Tibeto-Burman cognates and modern Min reflexes, and the fact that it is ignored in phonetic series. The distinction has been variously ascribed to:

- the presence or absence of a prefix. Jakhontov held that type B reflected a prefix *d-, while Ferlus suggested that type A arose from an unstressed prefix *Cə- (a minor syllable), which conditioned syllabic tenseness contrasting with laxness in type B syllables.
- a length distinction of the main vowel. Pulleyblank initially proposed that type B syllables had longer vowels. Later, citing cognates in other Sino-Tibetan languages, Starostin and Zhengzhang independently proposed long vowels for type A and short vowels for type B. The latter proposal might explain the description in some Eastern Han commentaries of type A and B syllables as huǎnqì 緩氣 'slow breath' and jíqì 急氣 'fast breath' respectively.
- a prosodic stress-based distinction, as later proposed by Pulleyblank, in which type B syllables were stressed in the first mora, while type A syllables were stressed on the second
- pharyngealization of the initial consonant. Norman suggested that type B syllables (his class C), which comprised over half of the syllables of the Qieyun, were in fact unmarked in Old Chinese. Instead, he proposed that the remaining syllables were marked by retroflexion (the *-r- medial) or pharyngealization, either of which prevented palatalization in Middle Chinese. Baxter and Sagart have adopted a variant of this proposal, reconstructing pharyngealized initials in all type A syllables.

== Medials ==
It is possible to account for the combinations of initials and finals of the Qieyun by combining these initials with and Old Chinese medial *-r- and the Old Chinese counterpart of the type A/B distinction as in the following table.

Reconstructed Old Chinese initials and medials
Qieyun final type		Qieyun initial type							
Qieyun final type		Labial	Dental	Retroflex stop	Dental sibilant	Retroflex sibilant	Palatal	Velar	Laryngeal
Type A	Divisions I and IV	*P-	*T-		*TS-			*K-	*Q-
Type A	Division II	*Pr-		*Tr-		*TSr-		*Kr-	*Qr-
Type B (div. III)	Pure and chongniu-4	*P-						*K-	*Q-
Type B (div. III)	Mixed and chongniu-3	*Pr-		*Tr-	*TS-	*TSr-	*T-, *K-	*Kr-	*Qr-

Here *P, *T, *TS, *K and *Q stand for consonant classes in Old Chinese. Some authors also add a medial *-l-.

== Vowels ==
The principal method of reconstructing Old Chinese vowels is to compare the rhyming of words in Old Chinese poetry with the finals ascribed to the same words in the Qieyun.

=== Traditional rhyme groups ===
The 31 traditional Shijing rhyme groups are each named after one of the corresponding Guangyun rhymes, with the choice sometimes varying between authors. Traditional scholars also arranged these rhyme groups into three sets, with vocalic, stop or nasal Middle Chinese codas respectively, that showed parallel developments.Pulleyblank (1977–1978), p. 181Norman (1988), p. 48

Parallel Shijing rhyme groups with Middle Chinese codas
vocalic coda 陰聲 yīnshēng		stop coda 入聲 rùshēng		nasal coda 陽聲 yángshēng	
		-p	緝 qì	-m	侵 qīn
		-p	葉 yè	-m	談 tán
-j	微 wēi	-t	物 wù	-n	文 wén
-j	脂 zhī	-t	質 zhì	-n	真 zhēn
-j	祭 jì	-t	月 yuè	-n	元 yuán
-	歌 gē	-t	月 yuè	-n	元 yuán
-j	之 zhī	-k	職 zhí	-ng	蒸 zhēng
-j	支 zhī	-k	錫 xī	-ng	耕 gēng
-	魚 yú	-k	鐸 duó	-ng	陽 yáng
-w	侯 hóu	-k	屋 wū	-ng	東 dōng
-w	幽 yōu	-k	覺 jué	-ng	冬 dōng
-w	宵 xiāo	-k	藥 yào		

The exceptional 祭 jì group included only words with the departing tone.

Each of the four classes of Middle Chinese finals – types A and B with and without retroflexion – is believed to be derived from the same set of vowels, which developed differently in each class. The first class, corresponding to Middle Chinese divisions I and IV, is the simplest, as its vowels were not affected by the retroflexion of the *-r- medial or the palatalization that arose from type B. Middle Chinese finals of this class have different patterns of co-occurrence with Shijing rhyme groups, depending on the type of Middle Chinese initial. Consider finals with nasal codas, with which the other groups are mostly parallel, the following correspondences are found:

Qieyun simple finals with nasal codas found in Shijing rhyme groups
Qieyun finals by initial type			Shijing rhyme group
Labial	Coronal	Velar or laryngeal	Shijing rhyme group
-om			侵 qīn
-em			侵 qīn
-em			談 tán
-am			談 tán
-om			談 tán
-won	-won	-on, -won	文 wén
-won	-en	-on, -won	文 wén
-en	-en	-en, -wen	真 zhēn
-en	-en	-en, -wen	元 yuán
-an	-an	-an, -wan	元 yuán
-an	-wan	-an, -wan	元 yuán
-ong		-ong, -wong	蒸 zhēng
-eng		-eng, -weng	耕 gēng
-ang		-ang, -wang	陽 yáng
-uwng			東 dōng
-owng			冬 dōng

Most workers assume that syllables that rhymed in the Shijing had the same Old Chinese vowel and coda. To reconcile the Qieyun finals with Shijing rhyming, Li Fang-Kuei proposed both simple vowels and diphthongs. For example, he reconstructed the 元 yuán rhyme group with three rhyming Old Chinese finals, *-ian, *-an and *-uan. This produced a system of seven vocalic nuclei, which were unevenly distributed across the different codas.

=== Six-vowel system ===
In the late 1980s, Zhengzhang Shangfang, Sergei Starostin and William Baxter (following Nicholas Bodman) independently argued these correspondence sets did not rhyme in Old Chinese, and could be reconstructed with distinct simple vowels. Baxter supported this thesis with a statistical analysis of the rhymes of the Shijing. For example, the dental coda -n features six different correspondences, and thus requires six vowels: (Note: The vowel shown as *ə here is reconstructed by other authors as *ɨ or *ɯ.)

Reconstructed vowels of simple finals with -n coda
Qieyun finals by initial type				Shijing rhyme group	OC vowel
Labial	Coronal	Velar or laryngeal		Shijing rhyme group	OC vowel
-won	-won		-won	文 wén	*-u-
-won	-en	-on	-won	文 wén	*-ə-
-en	-en	-en	-wen	真 zhēn	*-i-
-en	-en	-en	-wen	元 yuán	*-e-
-an	-an	-an	-wan	元 yuán	*-a-
-an	-wan		-wan	元 yuán	*-o-

Since the final -wen occurs only after velar and laryngeal initials, its -w- medial can be attributed to labialized Old Chinese initials, as described above. However, the finals -won and -wan also occur after dental initials, and must thus be constructed with rounded vowels *-u- and *-o- respectively. When these finals occur with velar or laryngeal initials, they could derive from rounded vowels or labialized initials. It is sometimes difficult to make a clear distinction, as in such cases as 館 kwanX, which rhymes in one Shijing poem with 亂 lwanH and 段 twanH (implying *-o-), and in another with 粲 tshanX (implying *-a-.

Finals with a labial coda -m show five correspondences, independent of initial type:

Reconstructed vowels of simple finals with -m coda
Qieyun finals	Shijing rhyme group	OC vowel
-om	侵 qīn	*-ə-, *-u-
-em	侵 qīn	*-i-
-em	談 tán	*-e-
-am	談 tán	*-a-
-om	談 tán	*-o-

There are too few Shijing rhymes with labial codas to produce statistically significant results regarding the finer-grain rhyming implied by this reconstruction. Irregular rhymes between -m and -ng suggest a possible distinction between *-əm and *-um.

Since the finals -wong, -weng and -wang occur only after velar and laryngeal initials, their -w- medials can be attributed to labialized Old Chinese initials. This means that before the coda -ng there is a direct correspondence between Shijing rhyme groups and Qieyun finals:

Reconstructed vowels of simple finals with -ng coda
Qieyun finals by initial type			Shijing rhyme group	OC vowel
Labial	Coronal	Velar or laryngeal	Shijing rhyme group	OC vowel
-ong		-wong	蒸 zhēng	*-ə-
-eng		-weng	耕 gēng	*-e-
-ang		-wang	陽 yáng	*-a-
-uwng			東 dōng	*-o-
-owng			冬 dōng	*-u-

There is some evidence that an early *-iŋ final developed to *-in or *-eŋ in different dialects.

== Tones and final consonants ==
There has been much controversy over the relationship between final consonants and tones, and indeed whether Old Chinese lacked the tones characteristic of later periods, as first suggested by the Ming dynasty scholar Chen Di. (Note: Chinese: “四聲之辯，古人未有。” in Chen Di (1541–1617), Máo Shī Gǔ Yīn Kǎo 《毛詩古音考》, quoted in Wang (1985), p. 72.)

The four tones of Middle Chinese were first described by Shen Yue around AD 500. They were the 'level' (平 píng), 'rising' (上 shǎng), 'departing' (去 qù), and 'entering' (入 rù) tones, with the last category consisting of the syllables ending in stops (-p, -t or -k). Although rhymes in the Shijing usually respect these tone categories, there are many cases of characters that are now pronounced with different tones rhyming together in the songs, mostly between the departing and entering tones. This led Duan Yucai to suggest that Old Chinese lacked the departing tone. Wang Niansun (1744–1832) and Jiang Yougao (d.1851) decided that the language had the same tones as Middle Chinese, but some words had later shifted between tones, a view that is still widely held among linguists in China.

Karlgren also noted many cases where words in the departing and entering tones shared a phonetic element within their respective characters, e.g.

- 賴 lajH 'depend on' and 剌 lat 'wicked'
- 欬 khojH 'cough' and 刻 khok 'cut; engrave'

He suggested that the departing tone words in such pairs had ended with a final voiced stop (*-d or *-ɡ) in Old Chinese. Being unwilling to split rhyme groups, Dong Tonghe and Li Fang-Kuei extended these final voiced stops to whole rhyme groups. The only exceptions were the 歌 and 祭 groups (Li's *-ar and *-ad), in which the traditional analysis already distinguished the syllables with entering tone contacts. The resulting scarcity of open syllables has been criticized on typological grounds. Wang Li preferred to reallocate words with connections to the entering tone to the corresponding entering tone group, proposing that the final stop was lost after a long vowel.

Another perspective is provided by Haudricourt's demonstration that the tones of Vietnamese, which have a very similar structure to those of Middle Chinese, were derived from earlier final consonants. The Vietnamese counterparts of the rising and departing tones derived from a final glottal stop and *-s respectively, the latter developing to a glottal fricative *-h. These glottal post-codas respectively conditioned rising and falling pitch contours, which became distinctive when the post-codas were lost. Haudricourt also suggested that the Chinese departing tone reflected an Old Chinese derivational suffix *-s. The connection with stop finals would then be explained as syllables ending with *-ts or *-ks, with the stops later disappearing, allowing rhymes with open syllables. The absence of a corresponding labial final could be attributed to early assimilation of *-ps to *-ts. Pulleyblank supported the theory with several examples of syllables in the departing tone being used to transcribe foreign words ending in -s into Chinese.

Pulleyblank took Haudricourt's suggestion to its logical conclusion, proposing that the Chinese rising tone had also arisen from a final glottal stop. Mei Tsu-lin supported this theory with evidence from early transcriptions of Sanskrit words, and pointed out that rising tone words end in a glottal stop in some modern Chinese dialects, e.g. Wenzhounese and some Min dialects. In addition, most of the entering tone words that rhyme with rising tone words in the Shijing end in -k.

Together, these hypotheses lead to the following set of Old Chinese syllable codas:

MC vocalic coda				MC stop coda	MC nasal coda		
平	上	去		入	平	上	去
				*-p	*-m	*-mʔ	*-ms
*-j	*-jʔ	*-js	*-ts	*-t	*-n	*-nʔ	*-ns
*-∅	*-ʔ	*-s	*-ks	*-k	*-ŋ	*-ŋʔ	*-ŋs
*-w	*-wʔ	*-ws	*-kʷs	*-kʷ			

Baxter also speculated on the possibility of a glottal stop occurring after oral stop finals. The evidence is limited, and consists mainly of contacts between rising tone syllables and -k finals, which could alternatively be explained as phonetic similarity.

To account for phonetic series and rhymes in which MC -j alternates with -n, Sergei Starostin proposed that MC -n in such cases derived from Old Chinese *-r. Other scholars have suggested that such contacts are due to dialectal mixture, citing evidence that *-n had disappeared from eastern dialects by the Eastern Han period. Baxter and Sagart cite transcription evidence for *-r, arguing that it became *-n in Western Old Chinese dialects and *-j in Eastern ones.

== See also ==
- Historical Chinese phonology
