= Zhengzhang Shangfang =

Chinese linguist (1933–2018)

- Born: Zheng Xiangfang (郑祥芳); 9 August 1933; Yongjia County, Zhejiang, China
- Died: 19 May 2018 (aged 84); Wenzhou, Zhejiang, China
- Occupation: linguist
- Known for: reconstruction of Old Chinese

Chinese name
- Simplified Chinese: 郑张尚芳
- Traditional Chinese: 鄭張尚芳
Transcriptions
Standard Mandarin
- Hanyu Pinyin: Zhèng-Zhāng Shàngfāng
- Bopomofo: ㄓㄥˋ ㄓㄤ ㄕㄤˋ ㄈㄤ
- IPA: [ʈʂə̂ŋ ʈʂáŋ ʂâŋ fáŋ]

Zhengzhang Shangfang (9 August 1933 – 19 May 2018) was a Chinese linguist, known for his reconstruction of Old Chinese.

== Early life and education ==
Zhengzhang was born as Zheng Xiangfang (郑祥芳 Zhèng Xiángfāng) in Yongjia County, on the outskirts of Wenzhou. As 祥 and 尚 have the same pronunciation in the Wenzhou dialect, his personal name became Shangfang (尚芳). While in high school, his parents changed his family name to Zhengzhang, which combined his father's surname Zheng (郑) with his mother's surname Zhang (张).

His early life was marked by challenges. His father left home due to his involvement in a labor strike, and Zhengzhang was raised by his grandfather. This early family situation did not stop his pursuit of knowledge. Influenced by his grandfather, he developed a strong interest in dialects at a young age. After graduating from Wenzhou Municipal High School in 1952, because of his family background and his family's political situation, he did not have the opportunity to attend university. He engaged in various jobs unrelated to his future career such as working as a geological exploration specialist at the Ministry of Geology, a cataloguer at Wenzhou Library and a private school teacher at Wuma Middle School in Wenzhou. However, he did not give up exploring linguistics. He spent much of his youth at libraries, and often joked that he had graduated from "Wenzhou Library University". His early struggles shaped his later work in linguistics.

== Academic career ==
Zhengzhang Shangfang's academic career was filled with research and contributions to the field of linguistics. His initial research projects were deeply rooted in his passion for dialects, which was ignited during his early life. With a focus on Chinese dialectology, he mainly dedicated himself to analyzing the linguistic landscape of China.

From 1955 to 1964 Zhengzhang Shangfang's first publications were over a dozen articles focused on romanization of Chinese and dialectal variations. In addition to his individual publications, he also joined the editorial team of the "Great Chinese Dictionary" in late 1970s and early 1980s.

One of his earliest research projects was on the Wenzhou dialect. He analyzed the phonetic, lexical, and grammatical aspects of Wenzhou dialect. His in-depth study of the Wenzhou dialect not only provided a comprehensive understanding of this local language but also laid a solid foundation for his further exploration of Chinese dialects. The main methodology used for his research of the pronunciation, vocabulary, and usage of the Wenzhou dialect was fieldwork. In 1964, two papers were published in the periodical "Studies of the Chinese Language", namely "The Phonological System of Wenzhou Dialect" and "Successive Tone Sandhi of Wenzhou Dialect".

He also worked at Fishery Machinery Factory for more than a decade around the period of the Cultural Revolution.

== Academic Achievements ==
Zhengzhang Shangfang had many academic achievements. Zhengzhang Shangfang reconstructed the phonological system of Old Chinese by comparing cognates within the Sino-Tibetan language family. In his pursuit of reconstructing Old Chinese phonology, Zhengzhang Shangfang employed a multi-faceted approach. He analyzed Chinese texts, historical records, and comparative data from related languages within the Sino-Tibetan language family in order to reconstruct Old Chinese phonology. By closely examining the rhyming patterns in classical poetry, the phonetic components of Chinese characters, and the phonetic correspondences with modern dialects and related languages, he was able to reconstruct Old Chinese phonology. This book, based on the 1981 Table of the Phonological System of Old Chinese, formed the "Zhengzhang System" after continuous supplementation and improvement, which was recognized and used by the linguistic community. Its outline was translated into English and published in Paris, France in 2000.

Zhengzhang Shangfang proposed that Old Chinese had a rather complex initial consonant system. Besides common single consonants there were also combinations of a main consonant with post - added elements such as -w, -j, -l, -r, pre - added elements like s-, ʔ-, h-, ɦ-, m-, N-, r-, p-, t-, k-, and various complex consonants with both pre - and post - added elements, as well as syllabic l and r initials. These were used to explain the complex relationships among initial consonants in phonetic series characters, cognate words, and interchangeable characters, along with their changes over time.

He postulated six nucleus vowels for Old Chinese: i, e, a, ɯ, u, o, each divided into long and short forms. The rhymes with short vowels developed into the third - grade rhymes in later generations. In terms of rhyme, he mentioned that there could be multiple nucleus vowels within one rhyme. He reconstructed the ancient entering tone finals into voiced stops -b -d -g, and reconstructed the yin tone finals that matched the -n-d finals into -l finals.

In addition, he participated in the investigation and compilation of Atlas of Languages in China, being responsible for the compilation and mapping of the Wu dialect, the southern Anhui dialect, and the northern Guangdong dialect. He conducted a large number of field surveys and refined the accuracy of the areas he was responsible for in the atlas to the township level.

He published more than 100 papers and some other works like Selected Blogs of Zhengzhang Shangfang. Through the comparison of cognate words within the Sino - Tibetan language family, he reconstructed the phonological system of Old Chinese and, together with Pan Wuyun, established the Zhengzhang - Pan System. He proposed a six - vowel system for Old Chinese. Essentially the same system was independently developed by William Baxter (building on a proposal by Nicholas Bodman) and by Sergei Starostin. In 1980, he joined the Chinese Academy of Social Sciences.

== Publications ==
- 上古音系 [Old Chinese Phonology] (Volume One)(in Chinese), Shanghai Educational Publishing House, 2003.
- 上古音系 [Old Chinese Phonology] (Volume Two) (in Chinese), Shanghai Educational Publishing House, 2013.
- 温州方言志 [Records of Wenzhou Dialect] (in Chinese), Beijing Zhonghua Book Company, 2008, ISBN 9787101060362
- 郑张尚芳语言学论文集 [Collected Linguistic Papers of Zhengzhang Shangfang] (in Chinese), Beijing Zhonghua Book Company, 2012, ISBN 9787101061055
- 汉字字音演变大字典 [The Great Dictionary of the Evolution of Chinese Character Pronunciations] (in Chinese), Jiangxi Educational Publishing House, 2012. (Zhengzhang Shangfang and Pan Wuyun)
- 温州方言文献集成 [Collection of Wenzhou Dialect Documents] (in Chinese), Zhejiang People's Publishing House, 2013. (Zhengzhang Shangfang and Shen Ke)
