= Sergei Yakhontov =

Russian linguist (1926–2018)

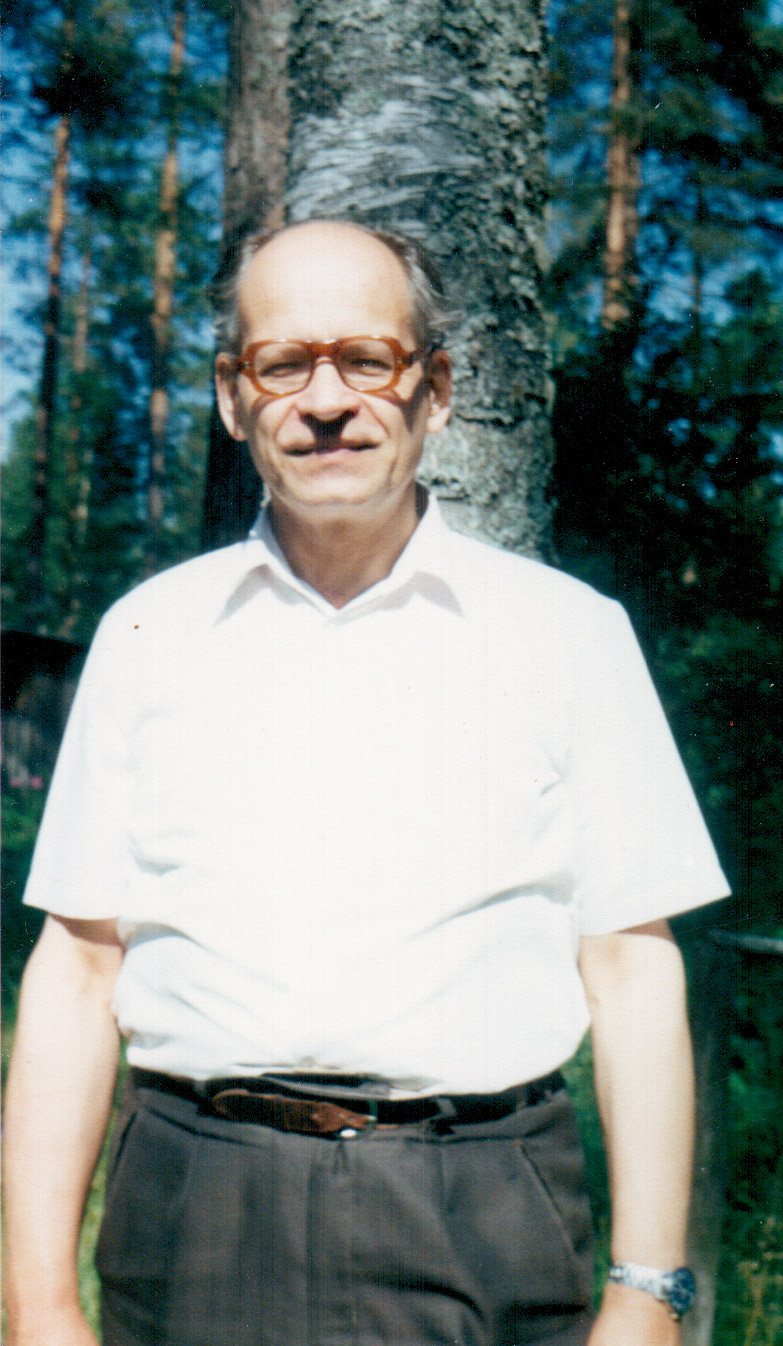
Sergey Evgenyevich Yakhontov

Sergey Yevgenievich Yákhontov (Russian: Серге́й Евге́ньевич Я́хонтов, Sergej Jevgen'evič Jachontov; December 13, 1926 in Leningrad – 28 January 2018) was a Russian linguist, an expert in Chinese, comparative, and general linguistics.

He was the son of astronomer Nataliya Sergeevna Samoilova-Yakhontova (1896-1994), the namesake of the minor planet 1653 Yakhontovia. His daughter Natalia Yakhontova is a well-known Mongolist from the Institute of Oriental Manuscripts.

In 1950, Yakhontov graduated from the Oriental Faculty of Leningrad State University. In 1962–1963, he underwent training in Beijing and visited Nanyang University (Singapore) from 1971 to 1972. He taught at the Oriental Faculty of St. Petersburg State University.

Yakhontov studied under Alexander Dragunov and developed on many ideas of his teacher, creating the Leningrad (St. Petersburg) school of Sino-Tibetan linguistics. He published dozens of articles, many translated into English, Chinese, and Japanese. In particular, he made major contributions to Old Chinese phonology, proposing the *l medial (now commonly treated as *r) and a rounded vowel *o, which led to the six vowel system that is now accepted by most researchers.

== Works ==
- Яхонтов С.Е. (1957). Категория глагола в китайском языке / Kategorija glagola v kitajskom jazyke [The category of verb in Chinese]. Leningrad: ЛГУ/LGU.
  - Chinese translation: 雅洪托夫 С. Е. 汉语动词范畴. 北京 : 中华书局. 1958. 188页. (中国语文丛书).
- Яхонтов С.Е. "Фонетика китайского языка I тысячелетия до н.э. (система финалей). [Chinese phonology of the 1st millennium BC (system of finals)]", Проблемы востоковедения 2 (1959): 137–147.
  - translation by Jerry Norman: "Chinese phonology of the first millennium BC", Unicorn 1 (1968): 47–65.
- Яхонтов С.Е. "Фонетика китайского языка I тысячелетия до н.э. (лабиализованные гласные). [Chinese phonology of the 1st millennium BC (labialized vowels)]", Проблемы востоковедения 6 (1960): 102–115.
  - translation by Jerry Norman: "The phonology of Chinese in the first millennium BC (rounded vowels)", Unicorn 6 (1970): 52–75.
- Яхонтов С.Е. (1963). "Сочетания согласных в древнекитайском языке [Consonant clusters in Old Chinese]", Труды двадцать пятого международного конгресса востоковедов, Moscow, 9–16 August 1960 г. Moscow: Издательство восточной литературы/Izdatel'stvo vostočnoj literatury. T. 5, 89–95.
- Яхонтов С.Е. (1965). Древнекитайский язык / Drevnekitajskij jazyk [Old Chinese]. Moscow: Издательство "Наука" / Izdatel'stvo 'Nauka'.
  - translation of chapter 2 (Phonetics) by Jerry Norman: "Old Chinese Phonology", Early China 4 (1978–1979): 37–40. JSTOR 23351387, doi:10.1017/S0362502800005873.
- 谢・叶・雅洪托夫, 唐作藩 Táng Zuòfān, 胡双宝 Hú Shuāngbǎo (1986). 汉语史论集 [Works on the history of Chinese]. Beijing: Peking University Press. OCLC 632032171.
