= Dong Tonghe =

Chinese linguist

Dong Tonghe or Tung Tung-ho (Chinese: 董同龢; pinyin: Dǒng Tónghé; October 12, 1911 – June 18, 1963) was a Chinese linguist particularly well known for his contributions to Chinese historical phonology.

Born in Kunming, Yunnan, China, Dong moved to Beijing at the age of four or five when his father was given a job at the Palace Museum. In 1930 he participated in dialect surveys of Yunnan and Sichuan under the direction of Yuen Ren Chao. In 1932, he was admitted to the Chinese Department of Tsinghua University. His thesis concerned issues in the Qieyun. In 1937, Dong was admitted to the Institute of History and Philology. He was one of the editors of the dialect survey report for Hubei, published in 1948 based on fieldwork done in 1936.

In 1949, Dong moved to Taiwan with the Institute of History and Philology and became a part-time professor of Chinese at National Taiwan University. From 1954 to 1955 he was a visiting scholar at the Harvard-Yenching Institute. In 1959, Dong was also a visiting professor at the University of Washington. From 1958 until his death in 1963, he focussed on the Austronesian languages of the Taiwanese aborigines.
