= Chen Di =

Chinese academic (1541–1617)

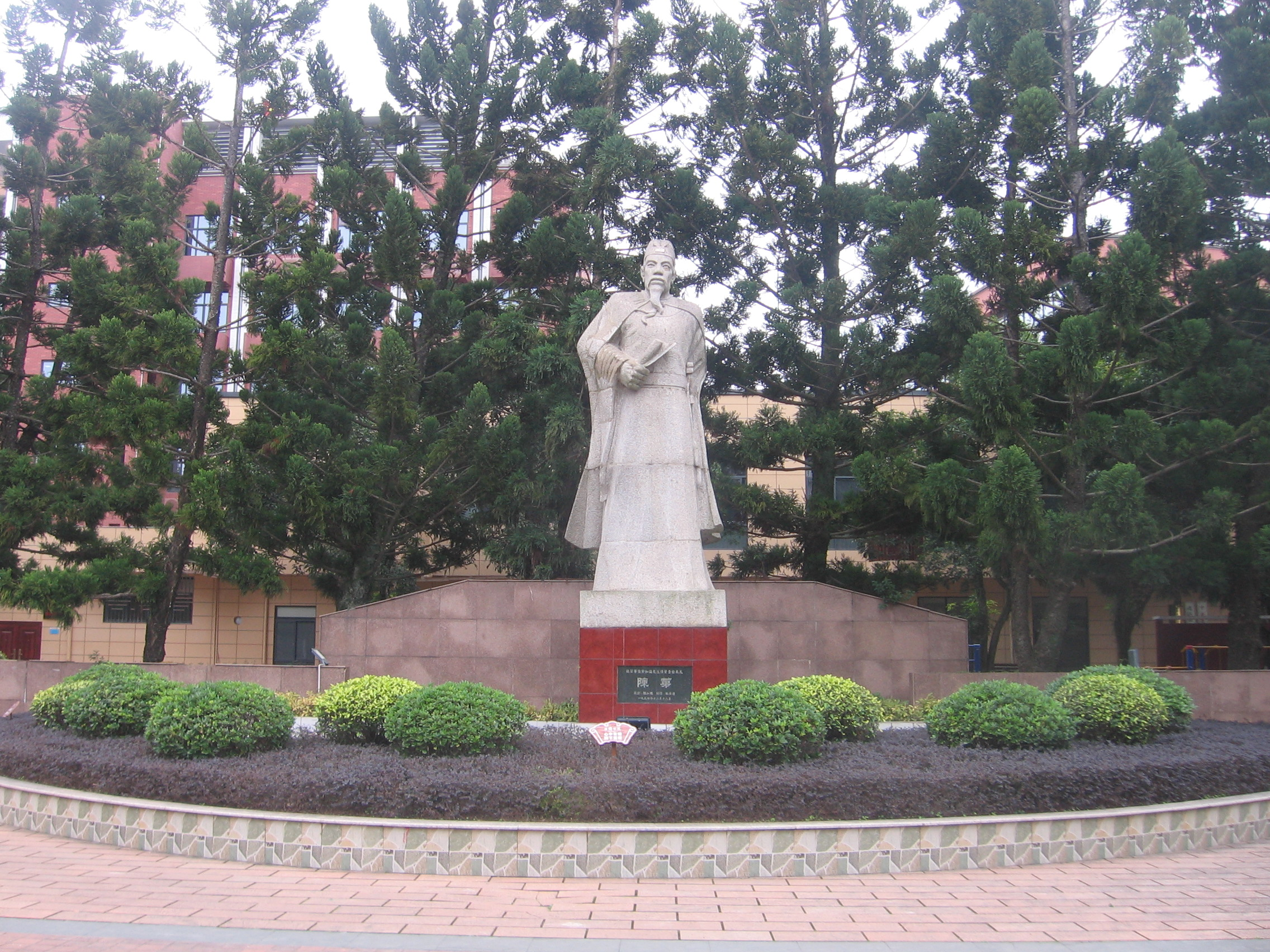
Statue of Chen Di in Lianjiang County.

Chen Di/Chʻen Ti (Chinese: 陳第; pinyin: Chén Dì; Wade–Giles: Chʻên^{2} Ti^{4}; 1541–1617), courtesy name: Jili (季立), was a Chinese philologist, strategist, and traveler of the Ming dynasty. A native of Lianjiang County, Fuzhou, Fujian, China, he was versed in both pen and sword. As a strategist, he served under Qi Jiguang and others for many years before retiring to occupy himself with studies and travel. He wrote an account of an expedition to Taiwan in his 1603 Dōng Fān Jì (東番記), providing one of the first descriptions of the island and its indigenous inhabitants.

As a philologist, Chen was the first to demonstrate that Old Chinese has its own phonological system, rejecting the then prevailing practice of xiéyīn (諧音) (i.e. changing the usual reading of a character in a Shi Jing poem in order to suit the rhyme). Encouraged by his senior, Jiao Hong (焦竑) (1540–1620), he wrote Máoshī Gǔyīn Kǎo (毛詩古音考) and Qūsòng Gǔyīnyì (屈宋古音義), in which he shows the ancient pronunciations (by homophones) of 650 characters. The results are based on painstaking analysis of the rhyming schemes in Shi Jing and other ancient rhymed texts, including I Ching and the poems of Qu Yuan. In his preface to the former work, Chen writes famously: "There is the past and the present; there is the north and the south. It is only inevitable that characters evolve, and sounds change." (蓋時有古今，地有南北；字有更革，音有轉移，亦勢所必至。)

== Taiwan ==
In January–February 1603, Chen Di visited Taiwan on an expedition against the Wokou pirates. General Shen of Wuyu defeated the wokou and met with the chieftain Damila, who presented gifts of deer and liquor as thanks for getting rid of the pirates. Chen witnessed these events and wrote an account of Taiwan known as Dongfanji (An Account of the Eastern Barbarians).

=== Aboriginal lifestyle ===
According to Chen, the Eastern Barbarians lived on an island beyond Penghu. They lived in Wanggang, Jialaowan, Dayuan (variation of Taiwan), Yaogang, Dagouyu, Xiao Danshui, Shuangqikou, Jialilin, Shabali, and Dabangkeng. Their land extended several thousand li covering villages where people lived separately in groups of five hundred to a thousand people. They had no chief but the one with the most children, who was considered a hero and obeyed by the populace. The people liked to fight and run in their free time so that the soles of their feet were very thick, able to tread on thorny brushes. They ran as fast as a horse. Chen figured they could cover several hundred li in a day. During quarrels between villages, they sent warriors to kill each other on an agreed upon date, but the conflicts ended without any enmity between them. They practiced headhunting. Thieves were killed at the village altar.

The land was warm to the point that people wore no clothes during winter. Women wore plait grass skirts that only covered their lower body. The men cut their hair while the women did not. The men pierced their ears while the women decorated their teeth. Chen considered the women to be sturdy and active, working constantly, while the men usually idled. They did not bow or kneel. They had no knowledge of a calendar or writing and understood a full moon cycle as a month with a year being ten months. They eventually forgot the count and lost track of their own age.

Their houses were made with thatch and bamboo, which grew tall and thick in abundance. Tribes had a common-house where all the unmarried boys lived. Matters of deliberation were discussed at the common-house. When a boy saw a girl he wished to marry, he sent her a pair of agate beads. If the girl accepted them, the boy went to her house at night and played an instrument called the kouqin. Upon acknowledgement by the girl, the boy stayed the night. When a child was born, she went to the man's home to fetch him back as a son-in-law and he would live with her family supporting them for the rest of their lives. Girls were preferred because of this. Men could remarry upon their wives' death but not women. Corpses were dried and buried beneath their families' houses when they needed to be rebuilt.

=== Agriculture ===
They did not have irrigated fields and cleared areas by fire before planting their crop. Once the mountain flowers bloomed they plowed their fields and once the grain ripened they were plucked. Their grains included soya bean, lentil, sesame, pearl-barley, but no wheat. For vegetables they had onions, ginger, sweet potatoes, and taro. For fruits they had coconuts, persimmons, citron and sugarcane. Rice grains were longer and tastier than the grains Chen was accustomed to. They gathered herbs and mixed them with fermented rice to make liquor. During banquets they drank the liquor by pouring it into a bamboo tube. No food was served during these occasions. They danced and sang songs to music. For domesticated animals they had cats, dogs, pigs, and chicken, but not horses, donkeys, cattle, sheep, geese, or deer. There were wild tigers, bears, leopards, and deer. Deer inhabited the mountains and moved in herds of a hundred or a thousand. Men hunted deer using spears made of bamboo shafts and iron points. They also hunted tigers. Deer hunts only occurred in the winter when they came out in herds. They ate deer meat and pig meat but not chicken.

=== Foreign relations ===
Although they lived on an island they did not have boats and feared the sea. They only fished in small streams. They had no contact with any of the non-Chinese peoples outside Taiwan. During the Yongle period (1403–1424), Zheng He carried an Imperial Edict to the Eastern Barbarians, but the indigenous people of Taiwan remained hidden and would not be coerced. Their families were given brass bells to hang around their necks to symbolize their status as dogs, but they kept the bells and handed them down as treasures. During the 1560s the wokou attacked the indigenous people of Taiwan with firearms, forcing them into the mountains. Afterwards they came into contact with China. Chinese from the harbors of Huimin, Chonglong, and Lieyu in Zhangzhou and Quanzhou learned their languages to trade with them. The Chinese traded things like agate beads, porcelain, cloth, salt, and brass in return for deer meat, skins, and horns. They obtained Chinese clothing that they only put on while dealing with the Chinese and took them off for storage afterwards. Chen saw their way of life, without hat or shoe, going about naked, to be easy and simple.

== Bibliography ==
- Thompson, Lawrence G. (1964). "The earliest eyewitness accounts of the Formosan aborigines". Monumenta Serica. 23: 163–204. doi:10.1080/02549948.1964.11731044. JSTOR 40726116.
