= Nicholas Bodman =

American linguist

Nicholas C. Bodman
- Born: July 27, 1913; Chicago, Illinois, U.S.
- Died: June 29, 1997 (aged 83); Northfield, Minnesota, U.S.
- Education: Yale University (BA, MA, PhD)
- Scientific career
- Fields: Sinology
- Workplaces: Cornell University
- Doctoral students: William H. Baxter

Chinese name
- Traditional Chinese: 包擬古
- Simplified Chinese: 包拟古
Transcriptions
Standard Mandarin
- Hanyu Pinyin: Bāo Nǐgǔ

Nicholas Cleaveland Bodman (July 27, 1913 – June 29, 1997) was an American sinologist and linguist who made fundamental contributions to the study of historical Chinese phonology and Sino-Tibetan languages.

Bodman was born in Chicago in 1913. He entered Harvard University in 1935, but left after one year and spent several years doing office work and traveling in Europe. He joined the United States Navy in 1941, and was assigned to Station HYPO at Pearl Harbor in early 1942 to join the team working to decipher Japanese naval codes. He retired from the navy in 1945 with the rank of Lieutenant commander.

After leaving the navy, Bodman enrolled at Yale University, where he obtained his B.A., M.A., and Ph.D., with a study of the phonology of the Shiming. While at Yale he was a student of Li Fang-Kuei, who was a visiting professor there at the time. He worked at the Foreign Service Institute from 1950 until 1962, rising to head to the Department of Far Eastern languages. Between 1951 and 1952, he was in Malaya on loan to the British government, where he created a course on Hokkien that is still a definitive reference.

In 1962, Bodman joined the faculty of Cornell University, where he stayed until his retirement in 1979. He continued to do fieldwork on Tibeto-Burman languages and Min dialects. In an unpublished paper presented at Princeton in 1971, he proposed a novel six-vowel system for a stage of Chinese prior to the Old Chinese of the earliest records. This system was later developed as a proposal for Old Chinese itself by Bodman's student William Baxter, and independently by Sergei Starostin and Zhengzhang Shangfang, and is now widely accepted. He marshaled his ideas on Old Chinese and its relationship with Sino-Tibetan in an influential treatment published in 1980. Later he published a series of papers reconstructing the history of the Min group.

== Publications ==
- ——— (1954). A Linguistic Study of the "Shih Ming": Initials and Consonant Clusters. Cambridge, MA: Harvard University Press.
- ——— (1955). Spoken Amoy Hokkien. Kuala Lumpur: Government of the Federation of Malaya.
  - adapted with dialogues rewritten by Wu Su-chu as Spoken Taiwanese, Spoken Language Services, 1983. ISBN 978-0-87950-460-1.
- ——— (1980). "Proto-Chinese and Sino-Tibetan: data towards establishing the nature of the relationship". In van Coetsem, Frans; Waugh, Linda R. (eds.). Contributions to historical linguistics: issues and materials. Leiden: E. J. Brill. pp. 34–199. ISBN 978-90-04-06130-9.
- ——— (1985). "The Reflexes of Initial Nasals in Proto-Southern Min-Hingua". In Acson, Veneeta; Leed, Richard L. (eds.). For Gordon H. Fairbanks. Oceanic Linguistics Special Publications. Vol. 20. University of Hawaii Press. pp. 2–20. ISBN 978-0-8248-0992-8. JSTOR 20006706.
