= Pan Wuyun =

Chinese linguist

Pan Wuyun (Chinese: 潘悟云; pinyin: Pān Wùyún, born March 1943) is a leading Chinese linguist and specialist in historical Chinese phonology.

== Career ==
Pan was born in Rui'an, Zhejiang in 1943. After graduating from high school, he was unable to attend college because of his family background and worked as a labourer in several Wenzhou factories. After the end of the Cultural Revolution, he tested into the graduate program of Fudan University in 1979, and earned his master's degree in Chinese language in 1982. He subsequently taught at Wenzhou Normal College before becoming a professor at Shanghai Normal University. He also taught as a visiting professor at the University of California, Berkeley, the University of Wisconsin, the University of Oslo, the City University of Hong Kong, the Chinese University of Hong Kong, and the National Tsing Hua University. In the Spring of 2005, Wuyun was a Fellow at the Swedish Collegium for Advanced Study in Uppsala, Sweden.

== Research areas ==
The strong point of Pan's research and teaching is the historical phonology of Old Chinese, Middle Chinese, and Chinese dialectology.

== Works ==
- Dongfang Wenhua yǔyán yǔ: Dunhuang zīliào 东方语言与文化:敦煌资料. Dongfang chūbǎn zhongxin 东方出版中心, Shanghai 2002, ISBN 7-80627-757-9.
- Hànyǔ lìshǐ yīnyùnxué "汉语历史音韵学". Shànghǎi Jiaoyu chūbǎnshè 上海教育出版社 2000, ISBN 7-5320-6820-X.
- Pan Wùyún zìxuǎnjí "潘悟云自选集" Anhui Jiaoyu chūbǎnshè 安徽教育出版社, Hefei, 2002, ISBN 7-5336-2863-2.

== Translations ==
- Yuánshǐ Hànyǔ yǔ zàngyǔ "原始汉语与汉藏语" ( Nicholas C. Bodman : Proto-Chinese and Sino-Tibetan), Zhonghua Shuju中华书局, Beijing 1995, ISBN 7-101-00924-7 (with Feng Zheng冯蒸).
- Shànggǔ Hànyǔ de fǔyīn xìtǒng上古汉语的辅音系统. Zhonghua Shuju中华书局, Beijing 1999, ISBN 7-101-02225-1 ( Edwin G. Pulleyblank : The consonantal system of Old Chinese, together with Xu Wénkān徐文堪).
- Han wén diǎn 汉文典. Shànghǎi císhū chūbǎnshè上海辞书出版社1997, ISBN 7-5326-0214-1 (Bernhard Karlgren: Grammata Serica).
