= List of works by Gu Yanwu =

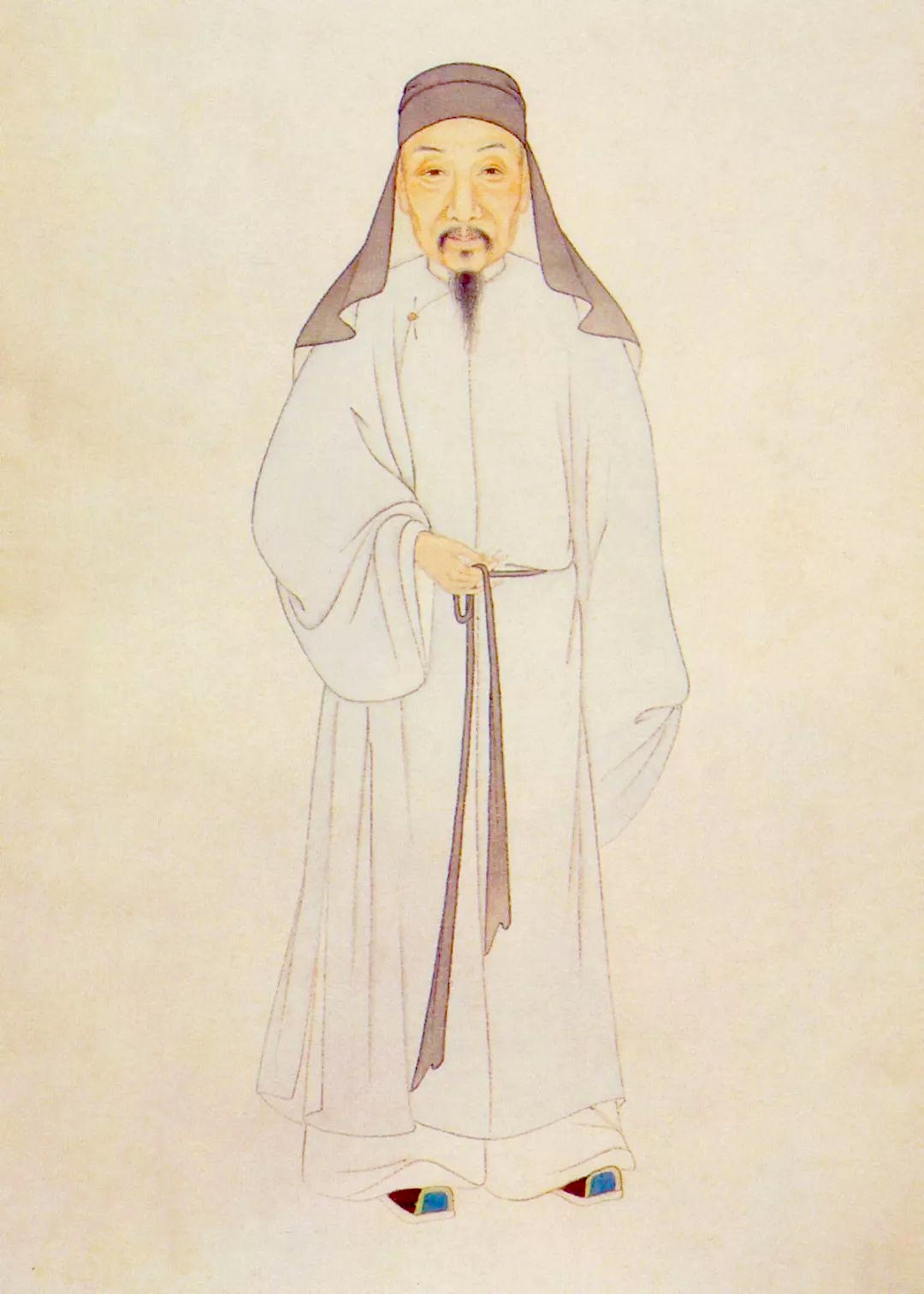
19th-century portrait of Gu by Ye Yanlan

Gu Yanwu (also known by his art name Tinglin (亭林)) was a 17th-century Chinese scholar, active during the transition from the Ming dynasty to the Qing dynasty. Born in Qiandun in what is now Jiangsu, he abandoned a career as a scholar-official after repeatedly failing to progress through the imperial examination system. Following the Manchu conquest, Gu destroyed his poetry compositions and took to wandering across northern China, where he collected a substantial quantity of historical documents and local gazetteers (geographic directories). He wrote many books, essays, and poems during his travels.

Only two of Gu's works, the Yinxue wushu and the first edition of the Rizhilu, were published during his lifetime, although the latter was greatly expanded in a posthumous edition published by his student Pan Lei. Many of his works were lost after his death, while others survived only as manuscripts and never saw proper publication. Pan collected some of his poems and letters and published them for the first time in the collection Tinglin yishu (亭林遺書; 'Posthumous Writings of Tinglin').

Several existing manuscripts which collected his letters, essays, and poems were included in the Gu Tinglin shiwenji (顧亭林詩文集; 'Collected Poetry and Prose of Gu Tenglin'), published by Zhonghua Books in 1959. Gu's longest work was Tianxia junguo libing shu (天下郡國利病書; 'On the Benefits and Faults of the Empire's Local Administration'), a collection of historical and local documents totaling 120 juan (a unit roughly equivalent to a chapter).

== Works by Gu Yanwu ==
Works by Gu Yanwu
Title	Translation	Length (in juan)	Description	Ref.
天下郡國利病書; Tiānxià jùnguó lìbìng shū	On the Benefits and Faults of the Empire's Local Administration	120	A large collection of historical documents and local records gathered by Gu during his travels across China, including additional information from his first-hand observations. In the work, Gu outlines the economic and political history of various Ming institutions, noting their decline over the course of the dynasty.	
肇域志; Zhàoyù zhì	Annals of Geography	100	A wide collection of notes gathered from local gazetteers and dynastic histories during Gu's research for the Tianxia junguo libing shu, recording the historical geography of different regions in China prior to the Ming dynasty	
音學五書; Yīnxué wǔshū	Five Books on Phonology	38	An analysis of the phonology of Old Chinese as it was spoken at the time of the compilation of the Confucian classics. Gu adapts the phonological method of the Ming writer Chen Di to dispute modern readings of classical poetry. It was published in 1667.	
日知录; Rìzhīlù	Records of Daily Knowledge	32	A large compilation of Gu's daily notes on statecraft, history, philosophy, and literature. It was first published as an 8-juan book in 1670, but was later expanded to 32 juan in a posthumous 1695 edition. As academic discussion became more widely permitted in the 1830s, an edition containing additional commentaries was published by Huang Rucheng in 1834. A purportedly older version was discovered by the revolutionary Zhang Ji in the 1930s and published in the 1950s, although its authenticity is a matter of scholarly debate.	
歷代帝王宅京記; Lìdài dìwáng zhái jīng jì	Record of the Emperor's Residences Through History	20	An examination of the cities, palaces, capitals, monasteries, and temples throughout different dynasties. It was completed near the end of Gu's life, but only published in 1808.	
顧亭林先生詩箋注; Gù Tínglín xiānshēng shī jiānzhù	Annotated Poems of Gu Tinglin	17	An annotated collection of Gu's poetry compiled by Xu Jia (徐嘉) and first printed in 1897	
經世篇; Jīngshì piān	Treatise on Statecraft	7	An obscure unpublished treatise which purportedly served as a guide to the imperial examination system	
金石文字記; Jīnshí wénzì jì	Notes on Epigraphic Inscriptions	6	A study and commentary of over three hundred post-Han stone inscriptions compiled by Gu during his travels, based on the epigraphic methods of Ouyang Xiu and Zhao Mingcheng. It was printed by Gu's apprentice Pan Lei in 1695 as part of the Tinglin shizhong and later in the Tinglin yishu.	
亭林文集; Tínglín wénjí	Tinglin Anthology	6	A collection of Gu's essays and writings, including his political treatises written after the fall of Ming	
亭林詩集; Tínglín shījí	Collected Poems of Tinglin	5	A relatively complete compilation of Gu's poetry, first published as part of the Tinglin yishu	
日知錄之餘; Rìzhīlù zhīyú	Additions to the Records of Daily Knowledge	4	A set of supplementary notes to the Rizhilu, including commentaries on calligraphy, Daoism, Buddhism, and legal restrictions. It was included with Huang Rucheng's 1834 edition of the Rizhilu.	
左傳讀皆補正; Zuǒ chuán dújiē bǔzhèng	Corrections to the Reading of Zuo Zhuan	3	A study of the errors made in the 3rd century scholar Du Yu's commentary on the Zuo Zhuan	
五經同異; Wǔjīng tóng yì	Similarities and Differences of the Five Classics	3	An analysis of Song, Yuan, and Ming-era textual criticism of the Five Classics	
昌平山水記; Chāngpíng shānshuǐ jì	Changping Landscape Notes	2	Various notes on the geography of Changping, a region near Beijing, from Gu's observations and travels	
聖安記事; Shèngān jìshì	Sheng'an Records	2	A summary of the events following the enthronement of the Hongguang Emperor and the establishment of the Southern Ming dynasty	
求文格論; Qiú wén gé lùn	In Search of a Literary Style Theory	1	A brief account of the manner in which ancient scholars recorded names, titles, times, and seasons. Its contents were incorporated into the Rizhilu	
亭林遺事; Tínglín yíshì	Tinglin Remnants	1	A short collection of Gu's poetry published by Zhu Jirong (朱記榮)	
京東考古錄; Jīngdōng kǎogǔ lù	Studies of Antiquities East of the Capital	1	A short record of place names and antiquities in the regions east of Beijing. All the contained material was incorporated into the Rizhilu and Changping shanshui ji, but the text itself was later published by Wu Zhenfang.	
求古錄; Qiúgǔ lù	Seeking the Ancient Records	1	A record of fifty-six stone inscriptions, commentated by Gu. They range from the Han to Ming periods.	
九經誤字; Jiǔjīng wùzì	Errors in the Four Books and Five Classics	1	A short discussion of errors found in contemporary editions of the Confucian Four Books and Five classics, comparing them with the versions of the texts found in stone inscriptions	
韻補正; Yùnbǔ zhèng	Rhyme Corrections	1	A short essay written while Gu was working on the Yuxue wushu. Based on the Song scholar Wu Yu's phonological treatise Yunbu, it describes errors and irregularities in ancient rhymes.	
顧氏譜系考; Gù shì pǔxì kǎo	A Study of the Gu Family Genealogy	1	A brief record of the Gu family's history and the origins of the surname	
明季實錄; Míngjì shílù	Veritable Records of the Ming Dynasty	1	A compilation of late Ming edicts, memorials, and dispatches. It was later included in the Tinglin yishu.	
山東考古錄; Shāndōng kǎogǔ lù	Record of Shandong Antiquities	1	A brief summary of errors in ancient Shandong geographic and personal names. It was later included in the Tinglin yishu.	
石經考; Shíjīng kǎo	Studies on the Stone Classics	1	A collection of textual criticisms of stone inscriptions of the Chinese classics. It was later included in the Tinglin yishu.	
營平二州地名記; Yíngpíng èrzhōu dìmíng jì	Records of the Place Names of the Two Yingping Prefectures	1	An incomplete collection of historical materials relating to two prefectures (zhou) in northern China	
菰中隨筆; Gūzhōng suíbǐ	Loose Notes from the Wild Rice Fields	1	A set of miscellaneous notes from Gu's readings which was later included in Huang Rucheng's 1834 edition of the Rizhilu	
雜錄; Zálù	Miscellaneous Records	1	A set of miscellaneous notes later included in the Rizhilu	
亭林餘集; Tínglín yújí	Additional Writings of Tinglin	1	A collection of twelve of Gu's essays collected during the early 17th century and later published by the scholar Peng Shaosheng. It includes Gu's memorial for his adoptive mother.	
