= He Shaoji =

Chinese calligrapher (1799–1873)

- 何紹基
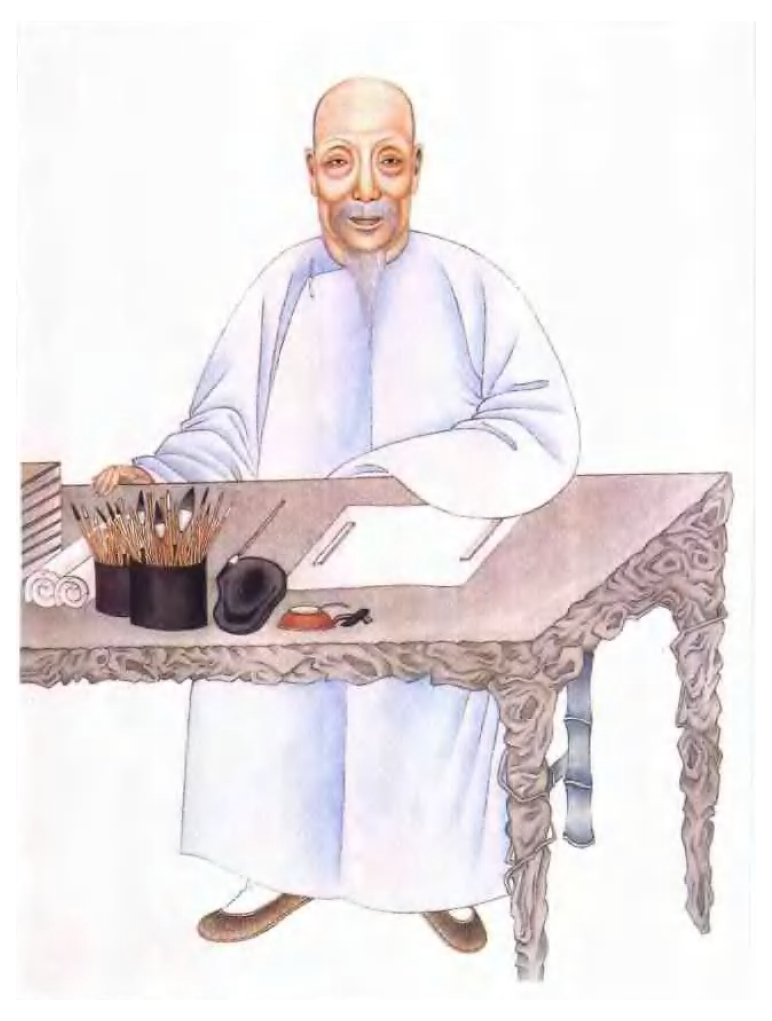
- He Shaoji

Personal details
- Born: 1799 China
- Died: 1873 (aged 73–74) China
- Occupation: Calligrapher, Poet, Painter

He Shaoji (Chinese: 何紹基; 1799–1873) was a Chinese calligrapher.

== Early life ==
His Chinese name was 何紹基. His courtesy name was Zizhen, his pen name was Dongzhou, and his late career pen name was Misou.

He was born in 1799 in China during the Qing dynasty.

He was born in Daozhou, Yongzhou Prefecture, Hunan Province, China. His father, He Linghan, served as Minister of Revenue.

In his early years, he was a protégé of Ruan Yuan and Cheng Enze, and was highly regarded and appreciated by his mentors.

He studied under Yuan Mei and learned calligraphy from him.

He died in 1873 in China.

== Career ==
He belonged to the Song poetry school during the Daoguang and Xianfeng reigns, his poetics often taken as a representative of scholar poetry and as an altered form of Wen Fanggang's concept of textuality.

=== Bureacratic career ===
In 1836 , he passed the Imperial Examination (Jinshi) and held various positions in the central and state governments.

=== Calligraphy career ===
He established a style that combined seal script and clerical script, based on the work of Yan Zhenqing. He was also skilled in seal script carving.

He was a contemporary of artists such as Chuang Che, Shen Shaomin, Liu Yong, Weng Tonghe, and Zhao Zhiqian.

== Legacy ==
Many of his Calligraphy works were collected by Mark S. Pratt, an American collector and were later auctioned to the general public by the Bonhams auction company.

== See also ==
- Gu Yanwu
- Chinese calligraphy
