= Willard J. Peterson =

American historian and sinologist

- Occupations: University professor and historian

Academic background
- Education: University of Rochester (B.A.) School of Oriental and African Studies, London University (M.A.) Harvard University (Ph.D.)

Academic work
- Discipline: World history and Sinology

Willard J. Peterson is an American historian and sinologist. He is Gordon Wu '58 Professor of Chinese Studies, Emeritus, and Professor of East Asian Studies and History, Emeritus at Princeton University. His research specialties include early Chinese philosophy and Chinese intellectual history and history of science during the Ming and Qing dynasties.

== Academic career ==
Peterson received his training as a sinologist from D. C. Lau and A. C. Graham in London in the 1960s. He went on to earn his Ph.D. from Harvard University in 1970 and began teaching at Princeton University.

Peterson's early works focus on prominent Chinese intellectual figures in the seventeenth century such as Gu Yanwu and Fang Yizhi by placing their writings in the context of new trends of Neo-Confucian philosophy after Wang Yangming as well as the Ming-Qing transition. In the 1980s, he published some of his most influential works in the Sinology circle, including his original annotation on the classical Chinese text The Book of Change, and a series of seminal papers on the Jesuit missionaries and their role in facilitating interactions of scientific knowledges between the East and West in early modern global history. Later, he became an important contributor and editor of the renowned The Cambridge History of China. He was the head editor of its two-part volume 9 on history of the first half of the Qing dynasty, published in 2002 and 2016, respectively.

At Princeton University, Peterson taught a wide range of classes on Chinese philosophy and Chinese history before his retirement in 2020.

== Notable publications ==
- Peterson, Willard J. (1968). "The Life of Ku Yen-wu (1613-1682)." Harvard Journal of Asiatic Studies 28: 114-156.
- —— (1973). "Western Natural Philosophy Published in Late Ming China." Proceedings of the American Philosophical Society, 117 (4): 295-322.
- —— (1979). Bitter Gourd: Fang I-chih and the Impetus for Intellectual Change. New Haven: Yale University Press. ISBN 0300022085
- —— (1979). "The Grounds of Mencius' Argument." Philosophy East and West 29 (3): 307-321.
- —— (1980). "'Chinese Scientific Philosophy' and Some Chinese Attitudes towards Knowledge about the Realm of Heaven-and-Earth." Past & Present 87: 20-30.
- —— (1982). "Making Connections: The Commentary on the Attached Verbalizations in the Book of Change." Harvard Journal of Asiatic Studies 42 (1): 67-116.
- —— (1986). "Calendar Reform Prior to the Arrival of Missionaries at the Ming Court." Ming Studies, 1986: 45-61.
- —— (1988). "Squares and Circles: Mapping the History of Chinese Thought." Journal of the History of Ideas 49: 47-60.
- —— (1988). "Why Did They Become Christians? Yang T'ing-yün, Li Chih-tsao and Hsü Kuang-ch'i." East Meets West: The Jesuits in China, 1592-1773. Chicago: Loyola University Press. ISBN 0829405720
- —— (1994). "What to Wear? Observation and Participation by Jesuit Missionaries in Late Ming Society." Implicit Understandings: Observing, Reporting and Reflecting on the Encounters Between Europeans and Other Peoples in the Early Modern Era. Cambridge: Cambridge University Press. ISBN 0521458803
- —— (1994). "Ssu-ma Ch'ien as Cultural Historian." The Power of Culture: Studies in Chinese Cultural History. Hong Kong: Chinese University Press. ISBN 9622015964
- —— (1998). "Confucian Learning in Late Ming Thought." The Cambridge History of China: Volume 8, The Ming Dynasty, Part 2: 1368–1644. Cambridge: Cambridge University Press. ISBN 9781139054768
- —— (1998). "Learning from Heaven: The Introduction of Christianity and Other Western ideas into Late Ming China." The Cambridge History of China: Volume 8, The Ming Dynasty, Part 2: 1368–1644. Cambridge: Cambridge University Press. ISBN 9781139054768
- Yu, Pauline, Peter Bol, Stephen Owen and Willard Peterson, eds. (2000). Ways with Words: Writing about Reading Texts from Early China. Berkeley, California: University of California Press. ISBN 9780520216051
- Peterson, Willard J., ed. (2002). The Cambridge History of China: Volume 9, The Ch'ing Dynasty to 1800, Part 1. Cambridge: Cambridge University Press. ISBN 9780511467462
- —— (2016). The Cambridge History of China: Volume 9, The Ch'ing Dynasty to 1800, Part 2. Cambridge: Cambridge University Press. ISBN 9781316445044

== Notable students ==
- Peter Bol (Charles H. Carswell Professor of East Asian Languages and Civilizations, Harvard University, USA)
- David M. Robinson (Robert H. N. Ho Professor in Asian Studies and Professor of History, Colgate University, USA)
