= Cheng Enze =

Chinese scholar

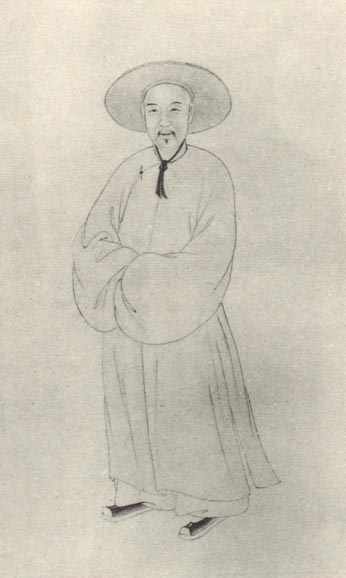

Cheng Enze (Chinese: 程恩泽/程恩澤; 1785 – 30 August 1837) was a Chinese scholar and poet of late Qing Dynasty. Cheng studied with Ling Tingkan, and obtained Jinshi in 1811, later became a compiler of Hanlin Academy (翰林院编修) and at last was promoted as Hubu Shilang (户部侍郎). He presented an idea that "anyone who want to make acquainted with Yili (义理, lit.Argumentation) must start with exegesis", and implemented it into his poetry writing. He was interested in Li Shangyin's poems at first, but later preferred the style of Han Yu and Huang Tingjian. Zheng zhen, He Shaoji and Mo youzhi were his students.
