= Gu Yanwu =

Chinese scholar (1613–1682)

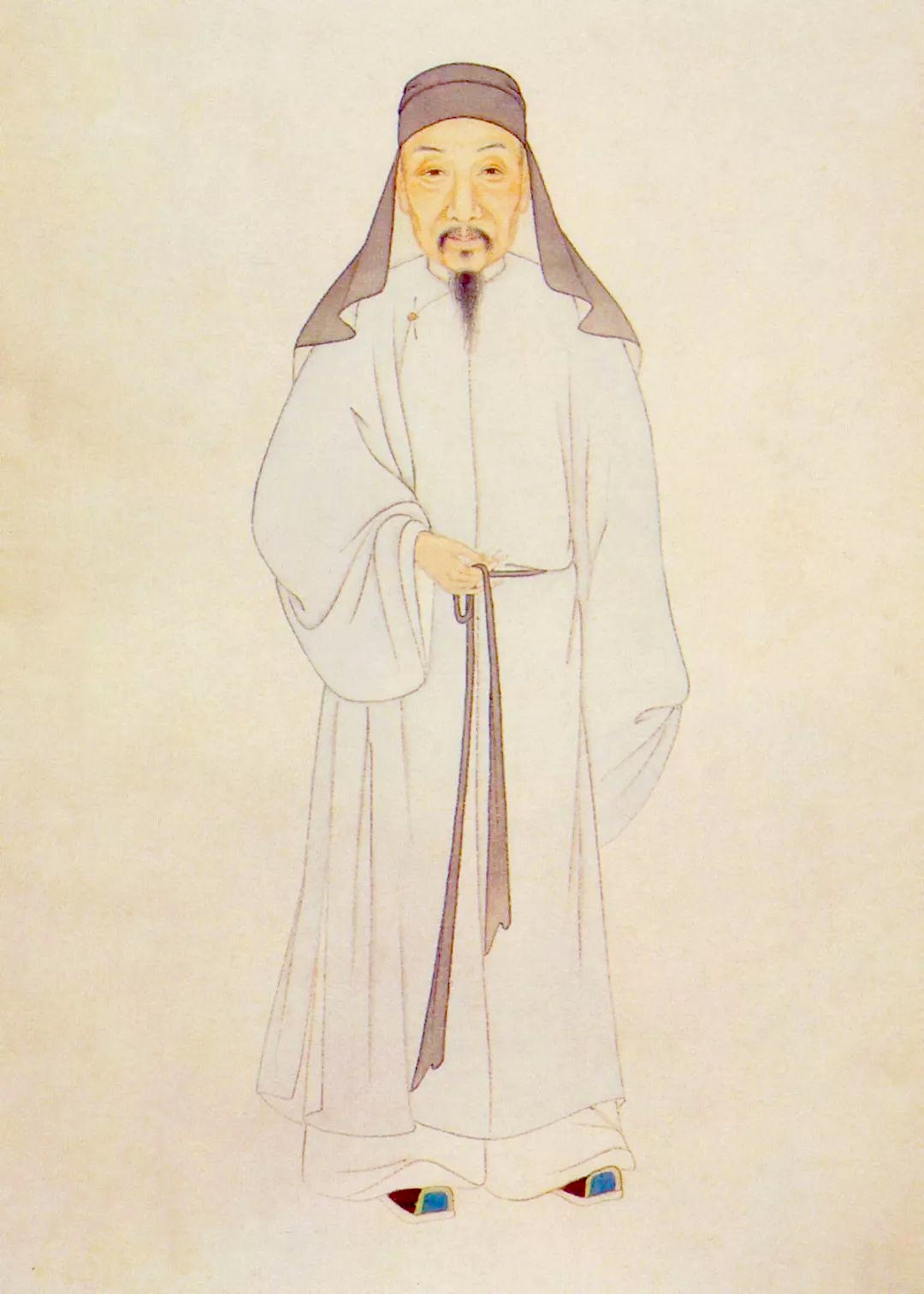
- 19th-century portrait
- Born: Gu Jishen; 1613; Qiandun, Jiangnan, Ming China
- Died: 1682 (aged 68–69); Quwo, Shanxi, Qing China
- Burial place: Kunshan, Jiangsu, China
- Notable work: Rizhilu; Yinxue wushu

Chinese name
- Traditional Chinese: 顧炎武
- Simplified Chinese: 顾炎武
Transcriptions
Standard Mandarin
- Hanyu Pinyin: Gù Yánwǔ
- Wade–Giles: Ku^{4} Yen^{2}-wu^{3}
- IPA: [kû jɛ̌n.ù]

Birth name
- Traditional Chinese: 顧繼紳
- Simplified Chinese: 顾继绅
Transcriptions
Standard Mandarin
- Hanyu Pinyin: Gù Jìshēn
- Wade–Giles: Ku^{4} Chi^{4}-shen^{1}

Second name
- Traditional Chinese: 顧絳
- Simplified Chinese: 顾绛
Transcriptions
Standard Mandarin
- Hanyu Pinyin: Gù Jiàng
- Wade–Giles: Ku^{4} Chiang^{4}

Courtesy name
- Traditional Chinese: 寧人
- Simplified Chinese: 宁人
Transcriptions
Standard Mandarin
- Hanyu Pinyin: Níngrén
- Wade–Giles: Ning^{2}-jen^{2}

Art name
- Traditional Chinese: 顧亭林
- Simplified Chinese: 顾亭林
Transcriptions
Standard Mandarin
- Hanyu Pinyin: Gù Tínglín
- Wade–Giles: Ku^{4} T'ing^{2}-lin^{2}

Gu Yanwu (Chinese: 顧炎武; pinyin: Gù Yánwǔ, 1613 – 1682) was a Chinese historian, philologist, and poet. After failing to pass the civil service examination and after surviving the upheaval of the Qing conquest of the Ming dynasty, he became an itinerant scholar, traveling across much of imperial China while collecting notes for his work.

Born to a family of scholar-officials in the village of Qiandun in modern Kunshan, Jiangsu, Gu was adopted as the grandchild of his paternal uncle as an infant. He was tutored in the Chinese classics by his adoptive family, and began to pursue advancement in the imperial examination system. After the death of his adoptive grandfather, he passed preliminary examinations in 1626, but repeatedly failed to advance to the rank of juren. He abandoned the exams in 1641. He became a Ming loyalist after the Qing conquest, changing his personal name from Jiang to Yanwu ('warlike and blazing'), but declined any political position in the Ming rump state, after which he began traveling across China, likely financed by his family's landholdings in Kunshan.

The most notable of Gu's works was the Rizhilu (日知錄; 'Record of Daily Knowledge'), an edited collection of his notes on various topics, most mainly related to statecraft and historiography. He was critical of Neo-Confucianism, Buddhism, and Daoism. He criticized political centralization and reliance on law codes, arguing this ultimately reduced central authority by delegating power to clerks and officials. He advocated for historical study centered on primary sources. Only two of his works – the first edition of the Rizhilu and his phonology treatise Yinxue wushu (音學五書; 'Five Books on Phonology') – were published during his lifetime; the rest of his surviving works, including a variety of poetry, geographical texts, and notes, were published by his lone disciple Pan Lei after his death. Many of his works were lost.

Gu's thought influenced scholars throughout the Qing period, and 19th-century scholars such as He Shaoji venerated him at a Beijing temple constructed in his honor. Later, revolutionaries such as Liang Qichao praised his work, stressing his empiricism and resistance to Qing rule.

== Early life and education ==
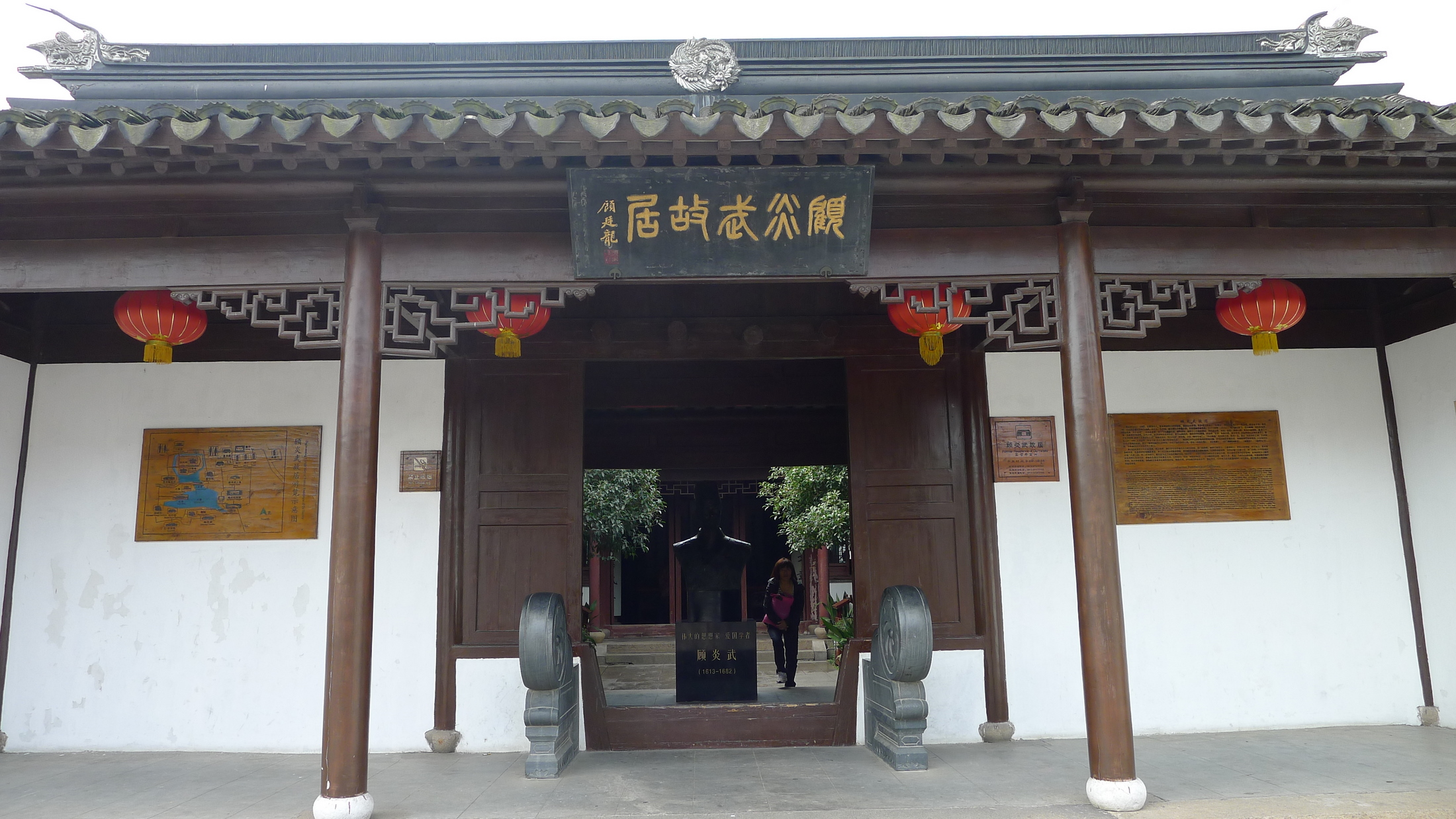
Former residence of Gu Yanwu in Qiandun (now Qiandeng, Kunshan, Jiangsu)

In 1613, Gu Yanwu was born under the name Gu Jishen (顧繼紳) in the village of Qiandun. This was about 24 li (about 14 kilometers or 9 miles) south of the city of Kunshan, in what was then the province of Jiangnan. Gu's ancestors had lived in the area for several centuries; he traced his roots to a man named Gu Qing who settled in the Yangtze Delta during the fall of the Northern Song around 1127. Gu's family had been wealthy scholar-officials (the educated class of government officials in Imperial China) since around 1524, when his family first settled in Qiandun.

Gu's father, Gu Tongying, was born in 1585. Orphaned at a young age, he became a minor scholar-official, but failed the provincial examinations seven times. However, he gained some local renown as a poet, like his father Gu Shaofu and eldest son Gu Xiang. He married a woman with the surname He (何), and had five sons with her and at least five daughters. Gu Jishen was the second of their sons.

Gu Tongying's paternal uncle was a scholar-official named Gu Shaofei. Shaofei did not progress far in the examination system, but purchased a scholarly rank from the Imperial Academy. His only son Gu Tongji had died at the age of eighteen in 1601, while betrothed to a woman with the surname Wang (王). Wang remained unmarried due to traditional customs and lived in relative seclusion with her would-be husband's family. As Jishen was Tongying's second son, he was adopted as the heir of the deceased Tongji, indirectly serving as an heir for Shaofei. Wang thus became his adoptive mother. Gu had little contact with his birth parents, and scarcely mentioned them in his works.

Gu was often sick as a child. At the age of three, he contracted smallpox, permanently disfiguring one of his eyes. Wang tutored him during his early childhood, using the works of the Song philosopher Zhu Xi. He then began attending a local school when he was seven. As part of his education, he read the Confucian Four Books and the philosophical treatise Huainanzi. His adoptive grandfather Gu Shaofei had him read various historical texts, such as the Guoyu, the Zuo Zhuan, and the Shiji. When Gu was eleven, his grandfather had him read the Song chronicle Zizhi Tongjian, telling him that understanding "one hundred juan (chapters) by Ming authors is not as good as understanding one juan from Song times".

=== Imperial examinations ===
Resenting both modern scholarship and the imperial examination system, Gu Shaofei did not initially focus Gu's studies around preparation for the examinations. However, on the advice of a family friend, he began training him for this, wishing to receive a high rank and a government stipend for his studies. In 1626, Gu passed an examination at Suzhou and became a shengyuan, or student scholar. Around this time, he purportedly joined the Fushe, a literary movement which sought to revive the philosophy and writing style of Chinese antiquity.

Gu's biological father, Gu Tongying, died that year. He went into the traditional period of mourning and did not take the 1627 examinations. However, his position as a shengyuan required him to ostensibly attend later annual examinations to reconfirm his status. The following year, the Commissioner of Education took sick leave and left during the grading process, and Gu's results were not released. In 1630, he passed the preliminary examinations, but later in the year failed the triennial examinations in Nanjing to become a juren (a higher rank of scholar). The following year, he married a woman with the surname Wang from Taicang and changed his name to Gu Jiang (顧絳).

Gu repeatedly took examinations throughout the 1630s. He often achieved the highest rank in the annual examinations, but achieved only the lowest rank in the higher-level preliminary examinations. He failed the triennial examinations for a second time in 1639. Taking Gu Shaofei's advice, he began to shift his focus from exams to private studies. He later wrote: "Realizing the many grievous problems with which the state was faced, I was ashamed of the meager resources which students of the Classics possessed to deal with these problems." He took notes as he read through the Twenty-One Histories and various local gazetteers. He later noted 1639 as the year he began collecting notes for his geography works.

== Career ==
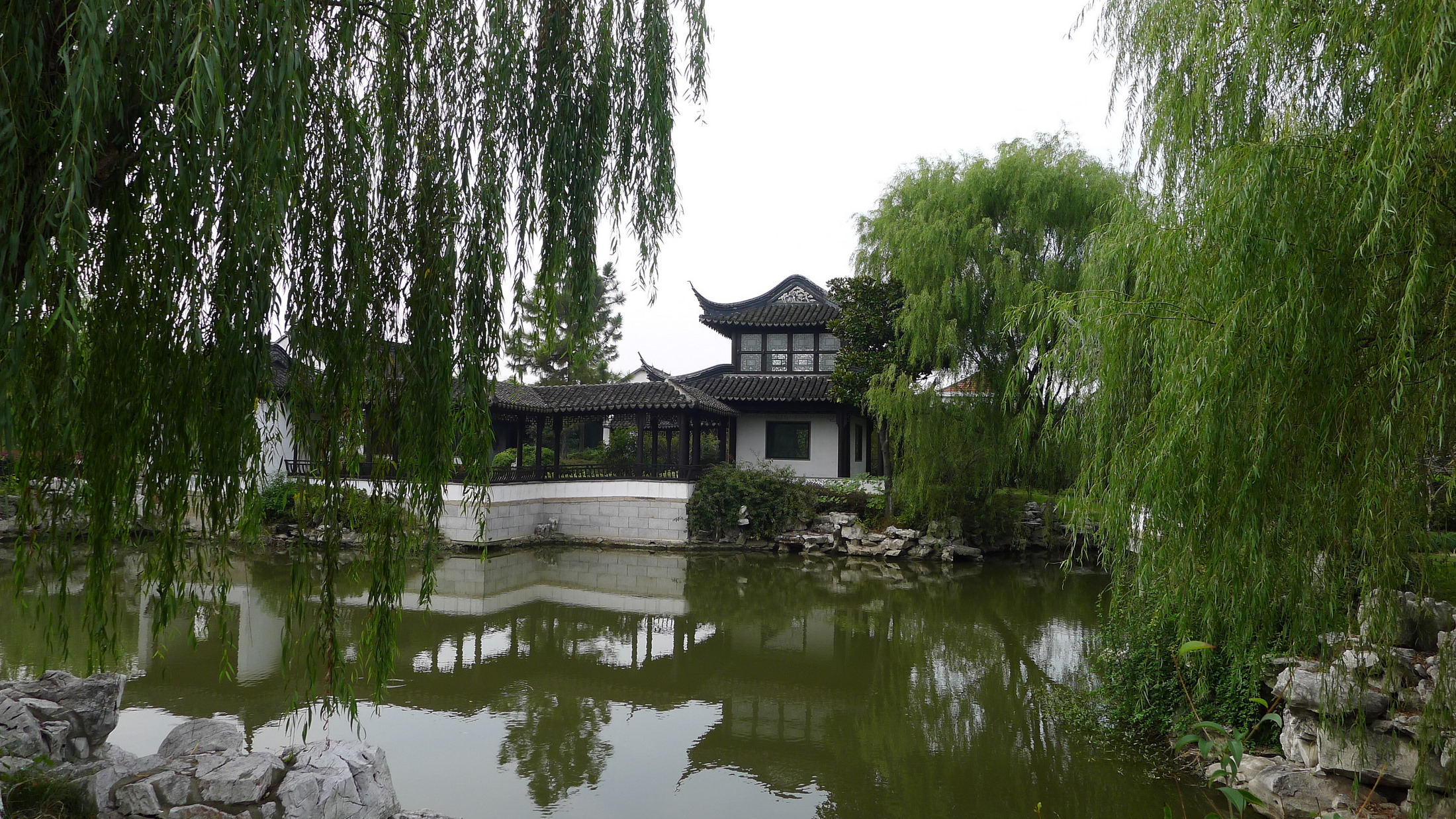
Gardens at the Gu Yanwu residence in Qiandeng

In 1641, Gu Shaofei died, and Gu returned home to mourn. After this, he no longer took part in the examinations. The next year, his older biological brother Gu Xiang died, and Gu became the head of the household. Financially burdened by the funerals of both his brother and Gu Shaofei, he was forced to mortgage part of his family estate to a prominent local scholar-official, Ye Fangheng, beginning a property dispute. Shaofei's death also created turmoil within his family, as Shaofei's nephews objected to the legitimacy of Gu's adoption. They unsuccessfully attempted to force Gu and his adoptive mother Wang to leave the family estate by setting fire to their home.

The invading Manchu Qing dynasty captured the Ming capital of Beijing in 1644 and continued south, threatening the rest of China. Gu and his family moved several times over the following months, as the local government began to break down across China. They briefly returned to their family residence at Qiandun, where they were robbed. After this, near the end of the year, they settled at a village named Yulianjing between Kunshan and Changshu.

The Southern Ming, a rump state of the Ming, was established in Nanjing under the rule of the Hongguang Emperor in 1644. Gu was recommended as an official by the magistrate of Kunshan, Yang Yongyan, and in early 1645 was called to Nanjing to serve in the office of the Ministry of War. After he departed for Nanjing, the Manchu captured Kunshan, killing two of Gu's younger biological brothers and injuring his biological mother. In the sixth month of the year (in the Chinese calendar), the Qing forces captured Nanjing and killed the Hongguang Emperor, forcing Gu to return home to Yulianjing before he had taken up office.

Gu's adoptive mother, Wang, allegedly killed herself through starvation in response to the Manchu conquest. In late 1645, Gu temporarily buried his mother at the family's burial ground in Kunshan, waiting for a potential Ming restoration to give her a proper funeral. Following the conquest, he changed his personal name to Yanwu (炎武, 'warlike and blazing' or 'fervent militancy') and destroyed all his prior poetry. His new name likely represented his devotion to protect China from the Manchu. The death of his mother greatly affected his emotional state. Gu's contemporary Wang Gen later wrote that he had "survived profound suffering, and was committed to glorifying the memories of his mother", but that his "sentiments concealed during those decades hardly ever found a chance to be expressed in full".

=== Wandering ===
In 1646, Gu sent a servant to the court of the Prince of Tang, a Ming prince who claimed the throne after the Hongguang Emperor was captured. The servant returned with a summons to the prince's court. Gu did not go, partially because he had not yet officially buried his mother. Additionally, the servant described the prince as having difficulties establishing a functional government. However, Gu wrote a poem entitled "A Messenger from Yanping Has Arrived" (延平使至; Yanping shizhi) in honor of the occasion. As the Southern Ming's resistance against the Qing conquest continued, many of Gu's friends and relatives were killed due to their Ming loyalist activities. He wrote a series of poems to honor them, although no evidence directly links him to participating in resistance activities.

Excerpt from Wandering About (流轉; Liúzhuàn)

- Having removed my hair here and there,
- I took the guise of a traveling merchant.
- Alas, when I think of these five years,
- It has not been easy for me to live like this.
- My arduous journeying took me over land and water;
- My enemy is waiting at my gate.
- I could not even spend a night under my own roof,
- Which I had to forsake to become a wanderer.

稍稍去鬢毛，改容作商賈。
卻念五年來，守此良辛苦。
畏途窮水陸，仇讎在門戶。
故鄉不可宿，飄然去其宇。

— Gu Yanwu, 1650, translated by Willard J. Peterson

For unclear reasons, Gu traveled along the coast of northern Jiangsu and Zhejiang in the autumn of 1647, visiting the city of Wuxing that winter alongside his friend Gui Zhuang. In late 1647, seeing little hope for a Ming restoration (likely due to intelligence gathered during his travels), Gu held a formal funeral for his mother in Kunshan. He returned to Yulianjiang near the end of the year.

After spending much of 1648 in mourning for his mother, Gu began to travel again that autumn. He first went to Suzhou, and then traveled south. In 1651, he returned to Nanjing to make a pilgrimage to the tomb of the Ming founding emperor Hongwu. He lived in Nanjing from 1652 to 1654 while his wife stayed in Kunshan. To help facilitate his frequent pilgrimages to Hongwu's tomb, he purchased a secondary residence on Shenlie Mountain.

==== Dispute with Ye Fangheng ====
In 1655, one of Gu's former servants, Lu En, had begun working for Ye Fangheng, the landowner with whom Gu had a property dispute. Lu sought to discredit Gu, and told local officials that he had connections to Ming loyalists in Fuzhou. Because of this, Gu returned to Kunshan and led a group of his friends and relatives who captured Lu, and either beat him to death or drowned him. Gu was arrested afterwards and (due to a bribe by Ye) held in confinement under the watch of men associated with Ye. Gu was sentenced to forced labor, but was able to secure a second trial due to the support of two of his friends. After this, he had his sentence reduced to a beating. He was released in early 1656 and returned to Kunshan.

Shortly after Gu returned to Kunshan, his biological mother died. While traveling to Nanjing, he was attacked by an assassin sent by Ye. Gu fell from a mule he was riding and suffered a head injury, but was able to run away and escape further injury with help from a bystander. Later in 1656, his house was robbed by men under Ye's employ. Feeling that he would be unlikely to secure a legal victory over Ye, Gu began to travel further outside of his home region.

=== Further travels ===
Gu spent much of his time traveling, although his reasons for doing so and his methods for financing his increasingly lengthy journeys are unclear. The American historian Willard J. Peterson described him as having a "predilection for being on the move", and noted that other potential reasons for his travel – such as political activities, visiting friends, and research for his historical scholarship – would only partially explain his itinerancy. Gu described himself as spending half his year staying at inns, and rarely staying in a single location for more than a couple months.

Gu's family's landholdings in Kunshan were likely the source of most of his income. However, he also gained some income through purchasing and renting out farmland and from his scholarly work. He received gifts and scholarly commissions from friends and Qing officials due to his growing reputation. In 1658, he traveled to Tai'an and climbed Mount Tai before traveling across Shandong to visit the Temple of Confucius and Temple of the Duke of Zhou at Qufu and the Temple of Mencius at Zouxian. He lived intermittently around Jinan from 1657 to 1659. During this time, Gu may have purchased a mortgage on a farm owned by his friend, who had been indebted to him. Over the following decade, Gu intermittently used this farm, located east of Jinan in Zhangqiu, as a staging ground for his travels in northern China. He left the farm to be managed by others, only staying on it for a few months at a time.

In 1659, Gu continued north, visiting Shanhai Pass and the Ming tombs of Shisanling. In autumn, he traveled south to visit Yangzhou before returning north to Tianjin. Around this time, he visited the ruined Lingyan Temple near Jinan and obtained a number of Tang-era inscriptions. For unknown reasons, he traveled south the following year; he went to Nanjing and Jiangnan in 1660, before visiting Suzhou, Hangzhou, and Shaoxing in 1661. Peterson theorizes that he may have intended to evaluate the Qing government's control over the region.

During the early 1660s, the Zhuang Tinglong case resulted in the execution of many historians who were associated with an unauthorized history of the Ming dynasty, greatly upsetting Gu and forcing him to abstain from writing about Ming history. He returned north in 1662, visiting various locations in Shanxi and Shaanxi over the next two years. After visiting Henan and parts of Shandong, he returned to Jinan in 1665 and fully took control of the farm in Zhangqiu. In 1667, he made his final trip south to Jiangnan.

The following year, while staying at a monastery in Beijing, Gu was told that he was implicated in a trial in Shandong. Upon his arrival in Jinan, he learned that he was one of a group of scholars accused of creating texts which slandered the Qing dynasty in favor of the Ming. He was arrested for sedition and imprisoned for about six months before he was exonerated and released later in 1668. He resumed travel the following year, making trips between Shandong and Beijing. A young scholar named Pan Lei traveled from Shanyang in Shaanxi to join Gu at Jinan. Pan was his only student.

In 1670, Gu published the eight-juan first edition of his collected essays, Rizhilu (日知錄; 'Record of Daily Knowledge'). The Qing official Xiong Cili summoned him to Beijing in 1671 and asked him to work on the compilation of the History of Ming, the Qing government's official history of the Ming. Gu refused to help, wishing to maintain his lifestyle and honor his adoptive mother's wishes that he never serve the Qing. He never served the Qing government in any capacity, although he maintained good relationships with many Qing officials, as well as his nephews Xu Yuanwen and Xu Qianxie, who served as advisors at the court of the Kangxi Emperor. He traveled to Taiyuan, Shanxi, where he helped edit a commentary on the Book of Han. The following year, he twice traveled between Shanxi and Beijing, staying at the capital with Xu Yuanwen. He continued frequent travels through the northern provinces in the following years.

=== Later life and death ===
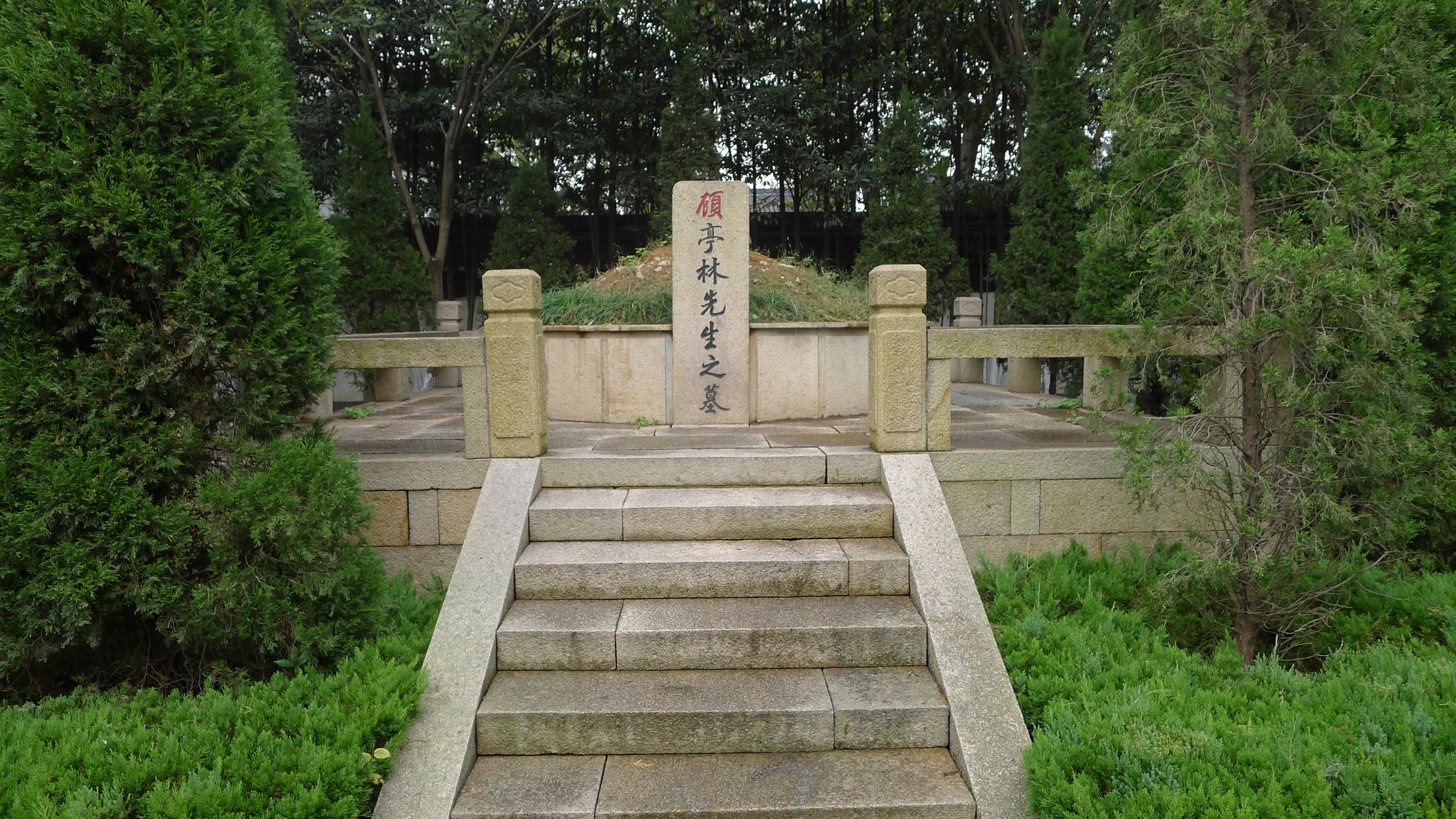
Gu Yanwu's grave in Qiandeng

In 1675, Gu began studying in a house built for him in Qi County, Shanxi, living there alongside a concubine. The house was built by his friend Dai Tingshi (戴廷栻), who collected art and sponsored Ming loyalists from his residence in Shanxi. Some 19th-century sources in Shanxi describe Gu and his friend Fu Shan as founding figures of the province's banking industry.

Gu Yanwu had one biological son, Yigu, who died at the age of four. As such, he had no heir for much of his life. In 1676, (Note: Mao Yike writes that this process began in 1672.) he summoned Gu Yansheng, the son of one of his distant cousins, from Wujiang. The two met at Dezhou, and Gu performed a ritual to recognize Yansheng as his son. Later, he adopted Gu Shishu – the grandson of his biological younger brother Gu Shu – as the heir to his deceased son Yigu and thus his own grandson. This was a controversial and unusual adoption at the time, as the adoption of heirs to sons who died before adulthood was prescribed against in prior Confucian doctrine. The adoption was later used as precedent in Qing legal discourse of adoption.

Gu refused to accept any position within the Qing government. In 1678, he refused to participate in a set of special scholarly examinations, an offer to work with a magistrate in Fuping County, Shaanxi, and an invitation to work with the son of a prominent military commander in Gansu. In 1680, he learned of the death of his wife, who had stayed in Kunshan during his period of travel. Gu did not return south, but carried out his period of mourning at the residence of a friend in Fenzhou, Shanxi.

After a journey to Quwo in 1681, Gu fell ill and began having difficulties walking. He completed the adoption rites of Gu Yansheng while staying with a friend in Quwo, and arranged his marriage to the daughter of an influential local family. Gu's health began to improve by the start of the following year. Shortly thereafter, he slipped and fell off his horse while attempting to mount it, and died the following day at the age of seventy. Two months later, Gu Yansheng arrived to obtain his coffin, which he took home to Kunshan for burial.

== Works ==
Gu read and wrote frequently throughout his life, purportedly bringing an additional horse with him while traveling to carry his books and study materials. He frequently sought out inscriptions when traveling near historical and religious sites. He published only two works during his lifetime: the phonology text Yinxue wushu (音學五書; 'Five Books on Phonology') and the first edition of his collected notes, Rizhilu (日知錄; 'Record of Daily Knowledge'). Much of his unpublished work was lost after his death, while some survived only as manuscripts. Pan Lei collected some of his poems and letters and published them for the first time in the collection Tinglin yishu huiji (亭林遺書彙輯; 'Collected Posthumous Writings of Gu Tinglin').

Gu's longest work was Tianxia junguo libing shu (天下郡國利病書; 'On the Benefits and Faults of the Empire's Local Administration'), a collection of historical and local documents totaling 120 juan. The book outlines the social, political, and economic history of the Ming dynasty, noting their increased corruption during the empire's decline. Taxes, corvée, national defense, tuntian (military colonies), land rights, and water conservation are covered. Gu described the text as a way to both record the knowledge he gained during his travels and advise on the use of natural resources.

The similar 100-juan text Zhaoyu zhi (肇域志; 'Annals of Geography'), a compendium of notes on historical geography, was compiled during work on Tianxia junguo libing shu. Another geography text, Lidai diwang zhai jing ji (歷代帝王宅京記; 'Record of the Emperor's Residences Through History'), details the foundation of cities, temples, and palaces across various dynasties.

=== Rizhilu ===
Gu published an eight-juan edition of the Rizhilu in 1670. After his death, Pan Lei edited the full 32-juan version of the anthology and published it in Fujian in 1695. The expanded edition included many edits, and some improvements suggested by scholars such as Yan Ruoqu, while others were made to avoid Qing literary censorship. The expanded version contains over a thousand essays; the smallest is less than a single column of text in length, while the largest is over 121 columns.

Described by scholar Jao Tsung-I as Gu's magnum opus, the Rizhilu is an edited anthology of Gu's notes compiled over a period of thirty years. The expanded edition is divided into sections about the classics, government, social customs, the examination system, historiography, and geography in addition to smaller sections on various other topics. It critiques mistakes in ancient works and, along with Tianxia junguo libing shu, serves to record many of Gu's historiographical ideas. It often includes broad analyzes of the evolution of individual phenomenon or institutions. Although anti-Manchu elements of the work were downplayed in order to evade censorship, Gu intended the work to advise on the resumption of Chinese statecraft after the end of Qing rule.

=== Yinxue wushu ===
Gu's Yinxue wushu (音學五書; 'Five Books on Phonology') analyzes the phonology of Old Chinese as it was spoken at the time of the compilation of the Chinese classics during the 1st millennium BCE. He adapts the phonological method of the Ming dynasty writer Chen Di to dispute modern readings of classical poetry. The five books total 38 juan in length. The first section, Guyin biao (古音表, 'Ancient Phonology Tables'), serves as a catalog of sounds in Old Chinese. Yiyin (易音, 'I Ching Pronunciation') studies the phonetics of the I Ching, while Shi benyin (詩本音, 'Original Sounds of the Shijing') analyzes the phonetics of the Shijing. Tang yunzheng (唐韻正, 'Tang Rhyme Corrections') compares the phonology recorded in Tang dynasty–era Middle Chinese to Old Chinese. The last book, Yinlun (音論, 'Phonology'), presents a general overview of Chinese historical phonology.

Gu's heterodox views on phonology were upsetting to some of his contemporaries; his friend Gui Zhuang wrote to him in 1668 that "I suspect that as your learning widens, it will grow stranger, which may not be limited to the field of phonology. If your other opinions are similar to these, would it be too abstruse and eccentric?" Gu responded with a series of six poems entitled "Coming East" (赴東; Fu dong), declaring that "My heart's principle will endure with constancy, / And like mountains and rivers does not ever change".

=== Poetry ===
Many Ming loyalists and former Ming officials wrote highly emotional poetry during the early Qing period, often recalling Tang-era poets such as Bai Juyi and Du Fu. Gu greatly admired Bai Juyi's allegorical poetry, believing that it captured poetry's fundamental purpose of expressing melancholy and critiquing society.

Much of Gu's poetry focuses on contemporary events, such as his 1644 poem Daxingai (大行哀; 'The Death of the Emperor'), made in mourning for the Chongzhen Emperor, the final emperor of the Ming. The first collection of his poetry was published by Pan Lei later in the Kangxi era. Following editions were subject to censorship due to Qing literary inquisitions, often resulting in the removal or alteration of taboo characters. The six-juan collection of poetry was reduced to four or five juan in later editions due to state censorship.

== Philosophy ==
Gu was a Confucian scholar generally critical of Neo-Confucianism, dismissing the thought of the 11th-century Cheng brothers as a derivative of Chan Buddhism. He critiqued Zhu Xi, a philosopher inspired by the Cheng brothers, and his concept of a "philosophy of rational principle" (理學; lixue). However, Gu did not closely follow the utilitarian approach of Zhu's contemporary opponents, such as Ye Shi. The historian Ian Johnston describes Gu as a "fundamentalist Confucian" due to his emphasis on classical philosophy and his rejection of Neo-Confucianism, Buddhism, and Daoism.

=== Governance ===
Why is it that the people keep getting poorer and the kingdom keeps getting weaker, to the point of chaos? The defect in fengjian is despotism from below. The defect in junxian is despotism from above. The ancient sages, treating the people of the empire with the public interest at heart, parceled out land and divided it into kingdoms. Today's rulers make everything within the four seas into their prefectures and districts and still think it's not enough. Everyone is the object of suspicion and everything is the object of control.

— Gu Yanwu, Gu Tinglin shiwenji, translated by John Delury

Gu argued that rulers should not try to change the moral and political values of a country, but that they should seek to constantly adjust the functions of state in order to adapt to new circumstances. He noted that the Qin dynasty's abolition of the fengjian (封建, 'hereditary governance') system of governance in favor of junxian (郡縣, 'prefectural governance') was a wise decision. However, he wrote that it was only from the prior decay of the old system that a new system was able to be implemented.

Gu conceptualized Tianxia (天下; Tiānxià; '[everything] under Heaven'; a concept centering the world on China) as both the moral foundations of Chinese civilization and Chinese civilization itself, with Tianxia enduring despite the rise and fall of successive dynasties. He warned of the potential for the "collapse of civilization" (亡天下; wáng tiānxià) as distinct from the fall of a dynasty, arguing that such a state would reduce humans to an animalistic existence.

Writing that the junxian system itself had grown obsolete, Gu argued for a new system which combined elements of both systems, featuring both a strong central authority and local devolution of power. He wrote that political centralization impaired the ability of local governments to effectively govern, ultimately weakening central authority, and that magistrates should be allowed to hold hereditary control over their home territory. According to him, this would incentivize them to aid the stability and security of the region out of their own self-interest. He argued that a true autocracy was futile to impose, and that a wise ruler should instead seek to rule through the "rule of many", emphasizing the status of local clans and familial lineages across the empire.

In one section of his Rizhilu, Gu disputes the idea that the emperor's sovereignty emerges from the Mandate of Heaven (the concept that heaven bestows legitimacy onto virtuous rulers and dynasties). He argues that the emperor's position is ultimately in service of the populace, and that there is no fundamental difference between the emperorship and any other political position besides rank. He praised the Ming dynasty's founder, the Hongwu Emperor, writing that he attempted to devolve power to local government. This was in contrast to many other scholars, who saw the Hongwu Emperor's rule as despotic for committing violence against his political enemies and purging his court of dissenters.

Gu wrote that the growing power of eunuchs and administrative clerks were symptoms of an over-reliance on regulation. He contrasts regulation (例; lì) with law (法; fǎ), arguing that laws and legal systems which emphasize the public good were essential for the survival of a dynasty. Gu saw law as a mechanism by which the ruler attempted to curtail his own officials; he wrote that this could be beneficial, but that over-reliance on codified legal and administrative regulations unintentionally delegates decision-making power to officials, eunuchs, and clerks, who might become corrupt.

Although he criticized Qin Shi Huang (the first Chinese emperor) for his autocratic rule, he praised the Qin dynasty for establishing an administrative and legal system which continued to the present day. Gu's defense of the Qin and of law more generally ran strongly against conventional Confucian doctrine, leading to some later scholars denouncing him as a Legalist. His approach was inspired by the 12th-century scholar Chen Liang, who implemented some elements of Legalist doctrine and opposed Zhu Xi's Neo-Confucianism.

=== Historiography ===
Gu outlined a method of historical writing centered on the collection of many distinct primary sources. He criticized his contemporaries for relying too heavily on secondary sources, comparing this to minting new coins by melting down old ones. Gu described his experience of finding previously unknown primary sources as leaving him "so overjoyed that he could not sleep". He emphasized the importance of corroborating sources with external evidence and viewing no one source (including classical histories such as the Spring and Autumn Annals) as inerrant. He also prescribed the use of citations for all quotations, including the mention of both authors when a quotation comes from a secondary source, describing it as a matter of respect for past generations.

Gu opposed the pursuit of knowledge purely for its own sake, writing that "historical books are composed to mirror what happened in the past so as to provide lessons for the present", illuminating the Tao through descriptions of state affairs and the livelihoods of the people. He believed that poems such as those collected in the Shijing could provide useful insight into the past. Criticizing scholars who objected to the inclusion of love poems alongside moral and philosophical poetry in the Shijing, Gu wrote that "people's customs are shown through verses and one may learn from them the growth and decay of a certain country".

Gu followed the models of Sima Qian, the Han dynasty author of the Shiji, as well as the medieval historians Sima Guang and Ma Duanlin, due to their lifelong dedication to objective historical research. Gu viewed history as a cyclical process, although he viewed some aspects of society, such as morality, as fundamental and unchanging.

== Legacy ==
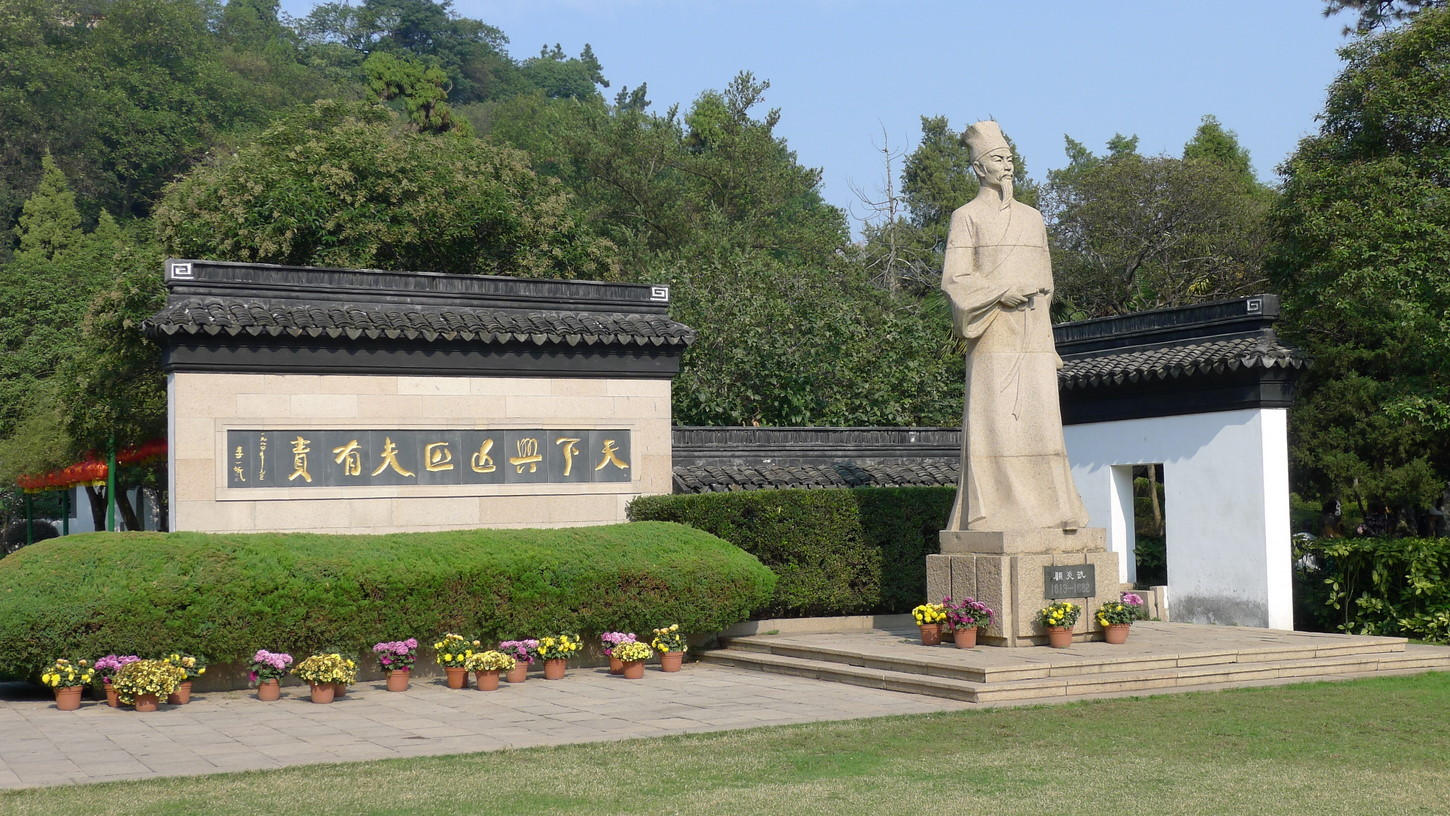
Modern statue of Gu Yanwu in Qiandeng

Gu's family remained prominent scholar-officials around Suzhou throughout the Qing period. One of his indirect descendants, born near the end of the Qing dynasty, was the heterodox historian Gu Jiegang. The first nianpu (年谱, 'chronological biography') for Gu Yanwu was compiled by his adoptive son Gu Yansheng after his death, while another was compiled by the early Qing official Li Guangdi. Li described Gu as being seen as "unsociable and eccentric" and known to "mock both the ancient and the contemporary", resulting in him being "despised by all the people" in Jiangnan.

In the early 19th century, additional nianpu were compiled by the historian Wu Yingkui. After a revival of interest in Gu's political philosophy during the middle of the 19th century, new nianpu were compiled by the scholars He Shaoji and Zhang Mu.

=== Influence and evaluation ===
Gu's works were read by many early Qing scholars, including both Ming loyalists and Qing officials. Zhang Xuecheng, writing in the late 18th century, considered Gu the founder of the "western" school of studies. He described Gu and his intellectual followers as more inspired by classical studies and Zhu Xi's works than the "eastern" school in the tradition of Huang Zongxi, which he described as emphasizing historical studies and the work of Ming philosopher Wang Yangming. Modern scholars have credited Gu with founding the philological field of Hanxue (漢學, 'Han learning').

The discussion of Gu Yanwu's political philosophy was limited until the waves of crises faced by the dynasty during the mid-19th century. In 1843, He Shaoji led a group of scholars to construct a temple to Gu in Beijing. This hosted a community of scholars who met annually at the temple to honor Gu from 1843. One of these scholars, Zeng Guofan, declared Gu one of the "two sages" of the Qing dynasty alongside the 18th-century thinker Qin Huitian. Gu's name was added to the Beijing Temple of Confucius in 1909, along with those of his contemporary Ming loyalists Wang Fuzhi and Huang Zongxi.

The writer and activist Liang Qichao, one of the founders of the New Culture Movement of the early 20th century, sought to elevate the importance of Gu's work. Liang argued that Gu incorporated the scientific method in his work, describing him as among the primary founders of the Kaozheng (考證, 'search for evidence'), an empiricist school of thought on textual criticism. One of Liang's contemporaries, the philologist Zhang Binglin, praised Gu for his resistance to the Qing dynasty and his denial of the dynasty's legitimacy, seeing his thought as applicable to the resistance to the Japanese occupation of Manchuria in the 1930s.

Up to the late 20th century, little in-depth scholarly attention was given to Gu's historiography. During the mid-20th century, Chinese historians Ch'ien Mu and Hou Wailu evaluated Gu's philosophy, but gave only cursory attention to his historical work. The American historian Willard J. Peterson wrote a biography of Gu in the 1960s, emphasizing his historiographical thought.
