= Qiandeng =

Qiandeng 千灯镇
- Town
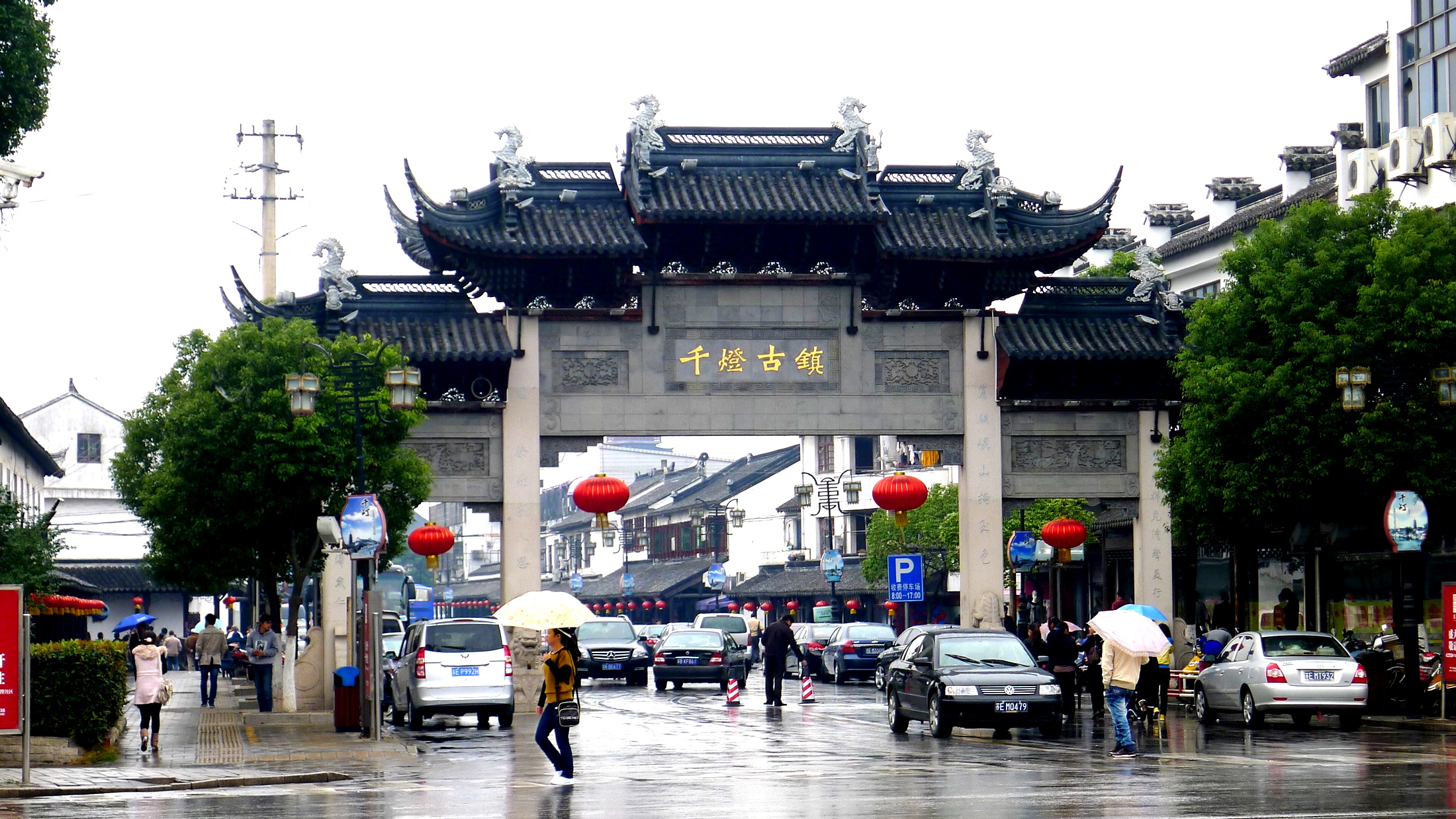

- Location in Jiangsu Qiandeng (China)
- Coordinates: 31°15′27″N 121°01′13″E
- Country: People's Republic of China
- Province: Jiangsu
- Prefecture-level city: Suzhou
- County-level city: Kunshan
- Time zone: UTC+8 (China Standard)

Qiandeng
- Simplified Chinese: 千灯
- Traditional Chinese: 千燈
- Literal meaning: one thousand lamps
Transcriptions
Standard Mandarin
- Hanyu Pinyin: Qiāndēng
- Wade–Giles: Ch'ien1-teng1

Qiandeng (simplified Chinese: 千灯; traditional Chinese: 千燈; pinyin: Qiāndēng; lit. 'one thousand lamps') is a town in Kunshan, Suzhou, Jiangsu, China. As of 2018, it has 12 residential communities and 16 villages under its administration. It is located 15 kilometres (9.3 mi) south of Kunshan city and borders Qingpu District, Shanghai on its east side. Qiandeng has an area of 84 km^{2} and a population of about 130,000.

Qiandeng has a rich cultural heritage. It was the native place of Gu Jian, the founder of Kunqu. It was also the birthplace of the famous Ming dynasty writer Gu Yanwu. Qiandeng is now a national historical and cultural town in China, as well as a national 4A grade scenic destination.

== History ==
Qiandeng was called Qiandun (Chinese: 千墩; lit. 'one thousand piers') since the Ming dynasty. It was renamed Qiandun village in 1910, established as a township in 1950, and changed to its present name in 2003.

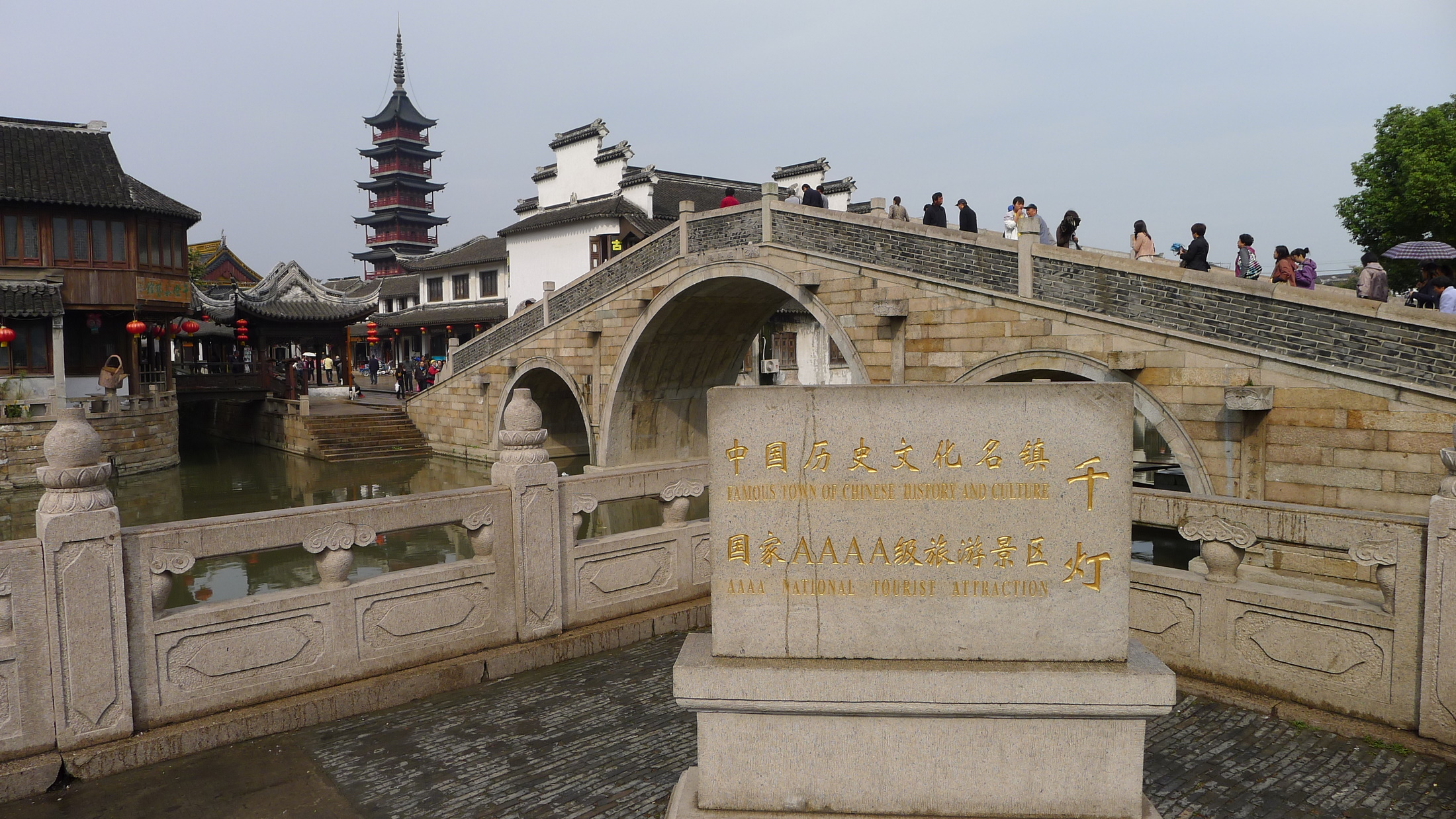
4A travel destination

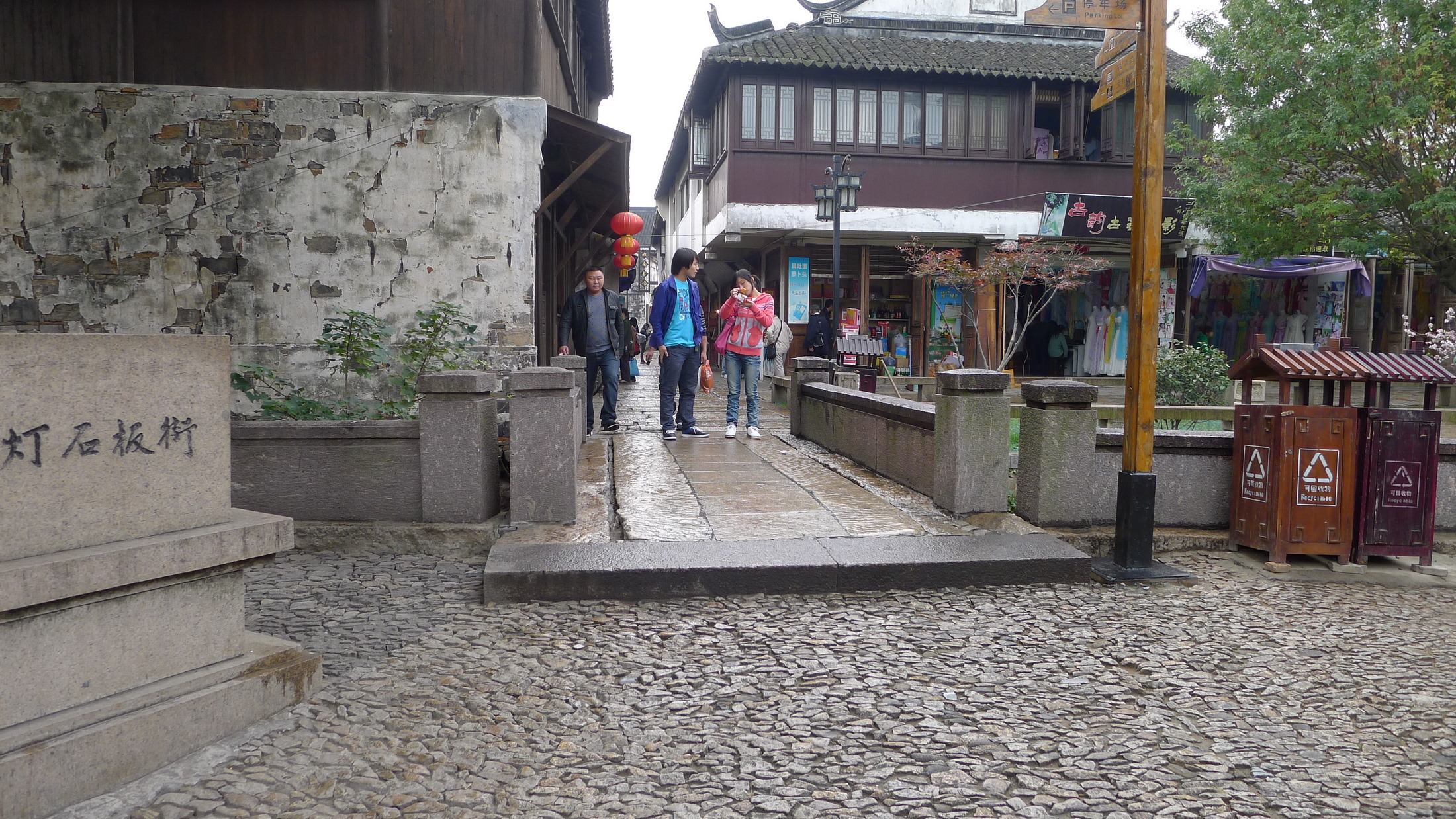
Ancient slabstone lane

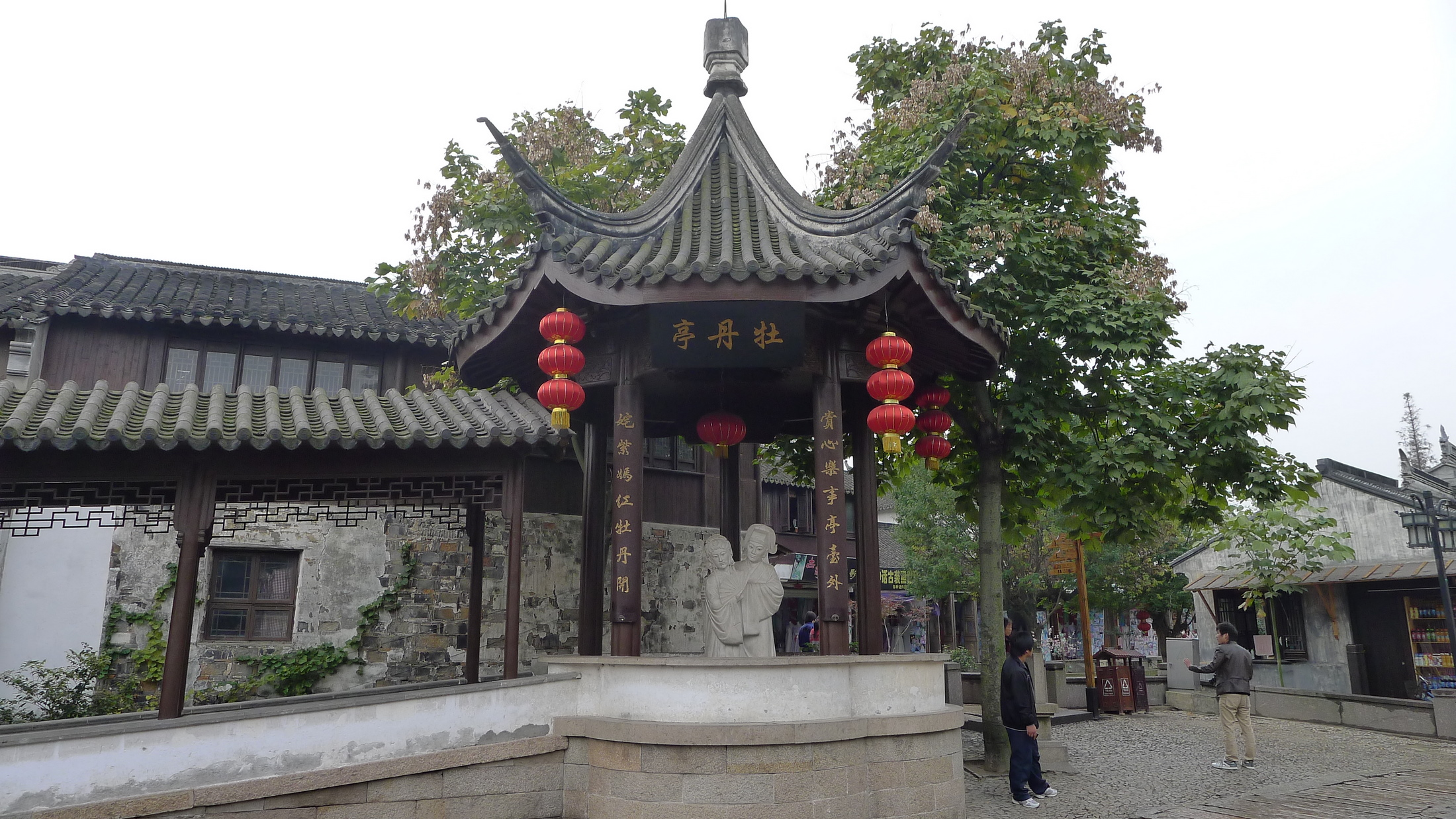
Peony pavilion

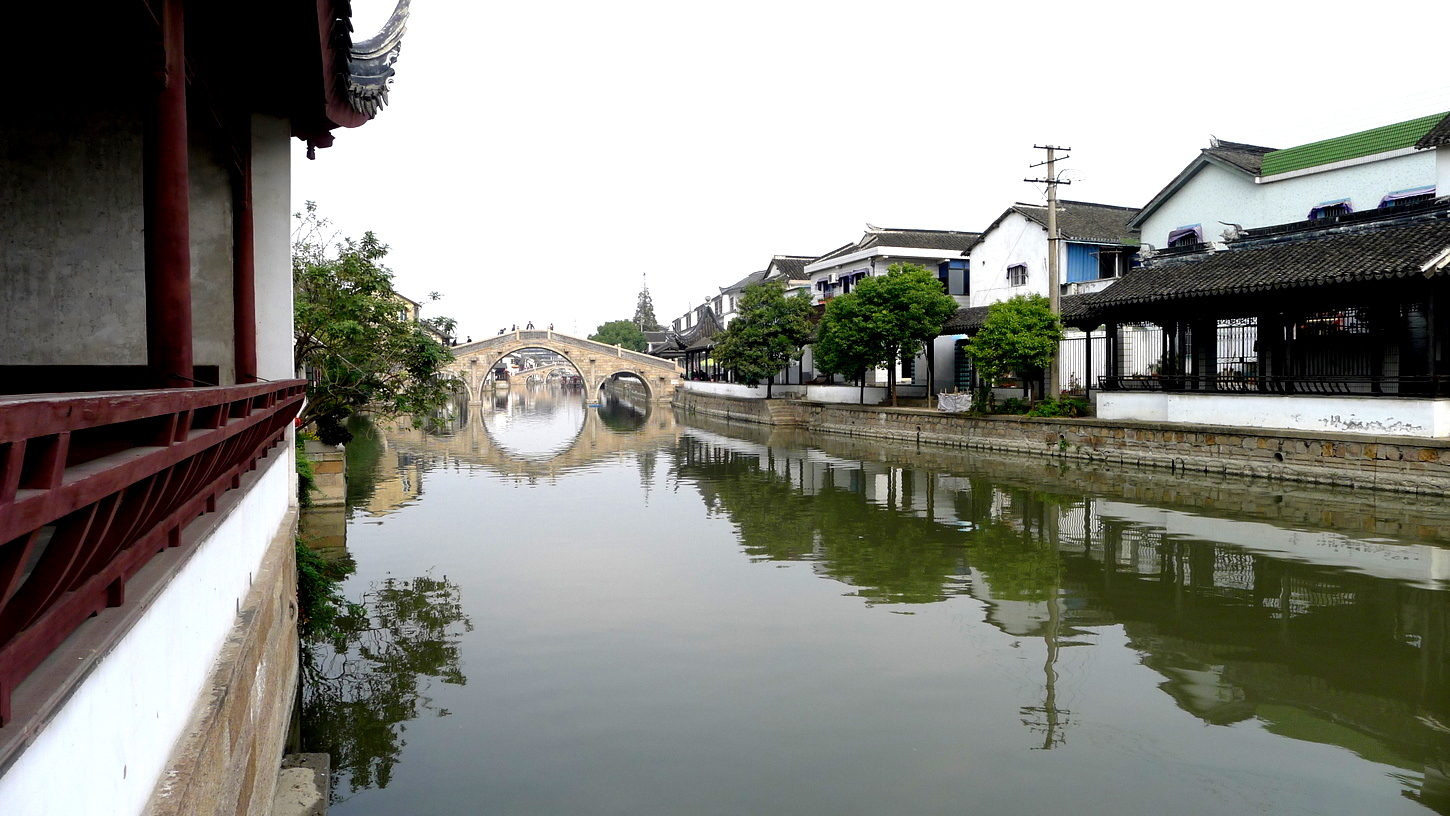

== Gu Jian Museum ==
Gu Jian Museum commemorates Gu Jian (顧堅, fl. 14th century?), the founder of Kunqu. It is located at the west bank of Qiandeng river.

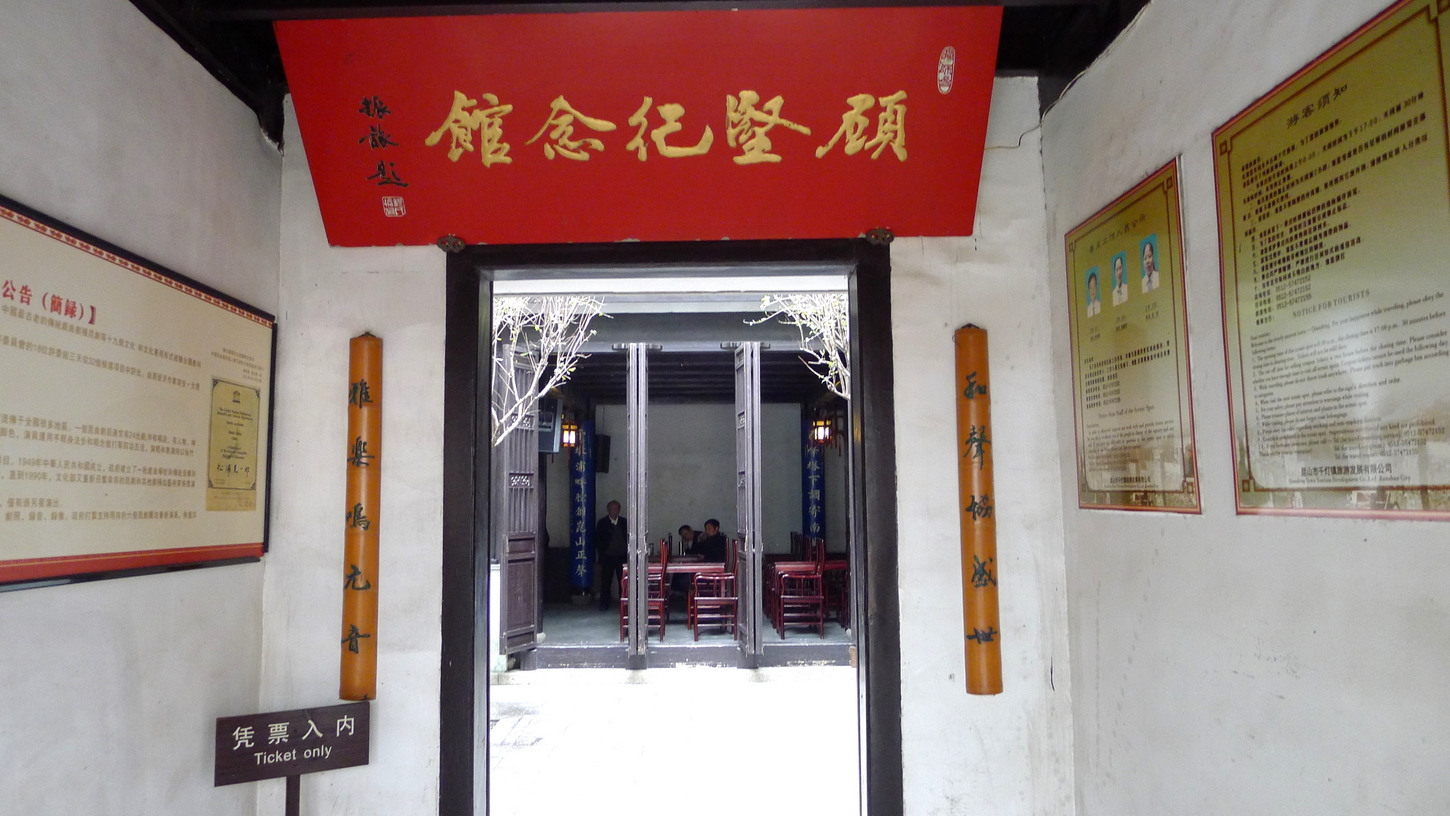
Gu Jian Museum

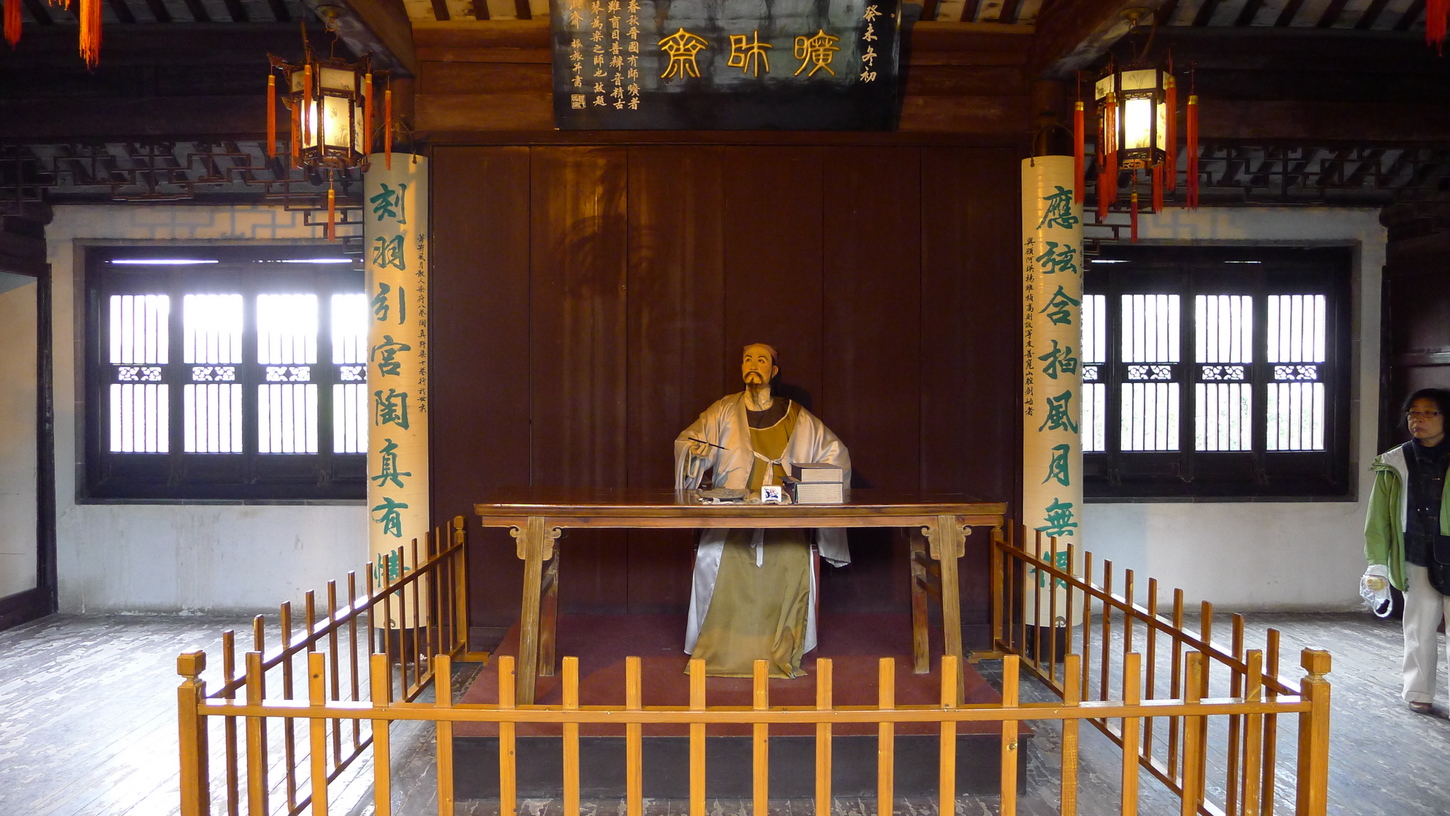
Gu Jian, founder of Kunqu

== Former residence of Gu Yanwu ==
The former residence of Gu Yanwu was built by Gu Yanwu's grandfather, it was destroyed by Japanese pirates, later rebuilt. It is a Ming Dynasty style building complex with formal sitting room, dining room, study and a garden. Gu Yanwu's grave is located at a quiet corner of the Gu Garden

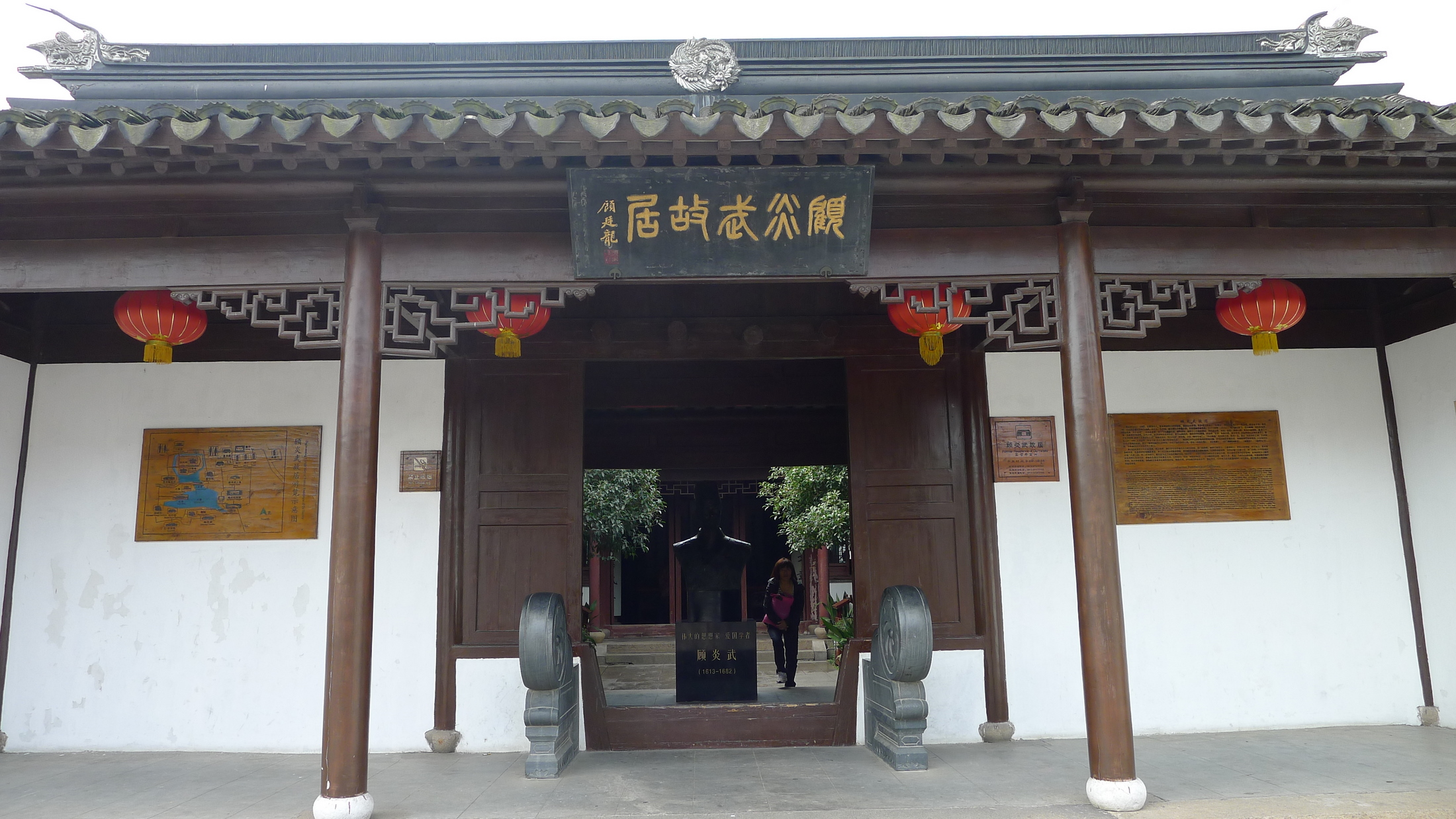
Former residence of Gu Yanwu

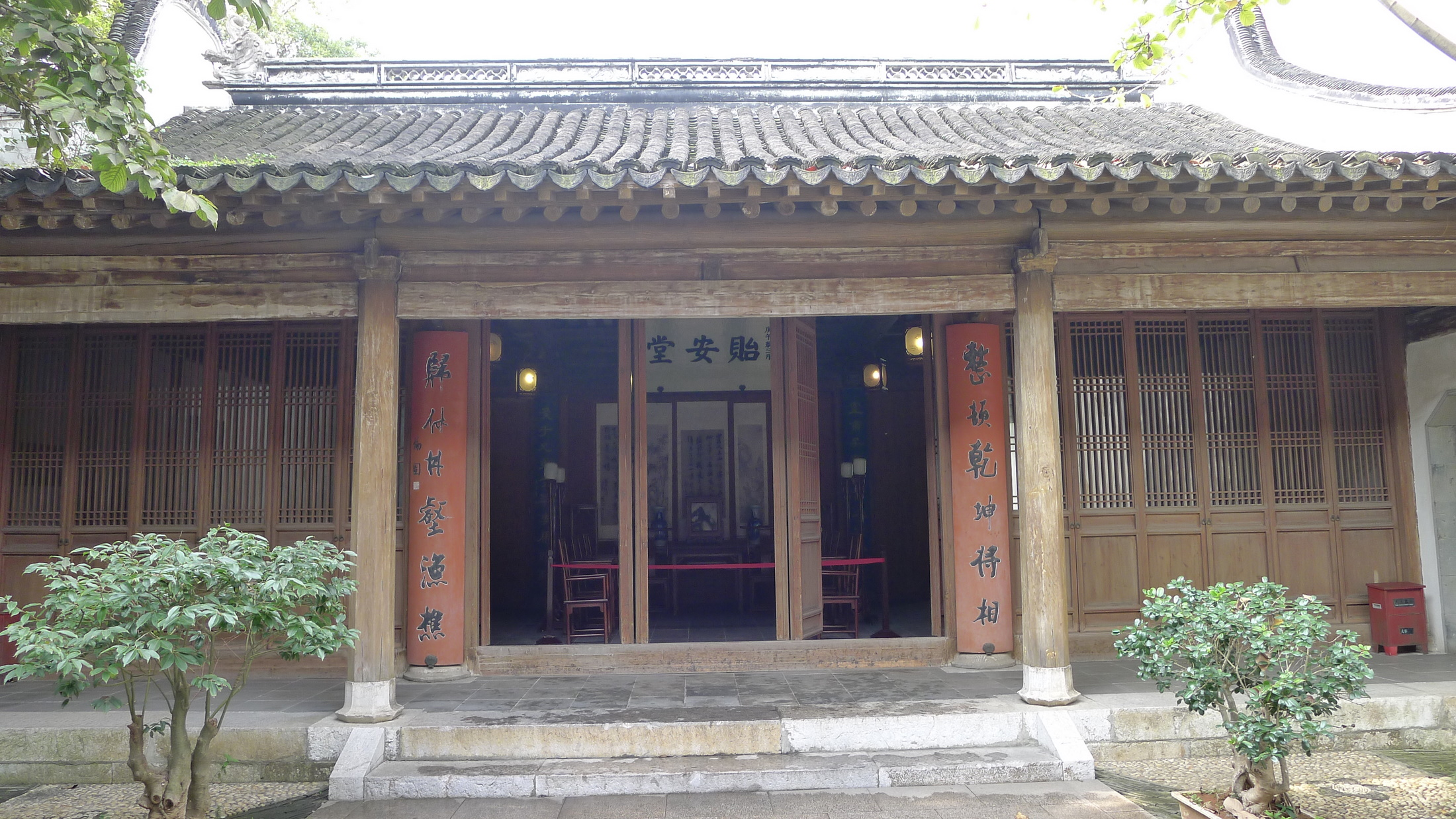
Parlor Yi An Hall

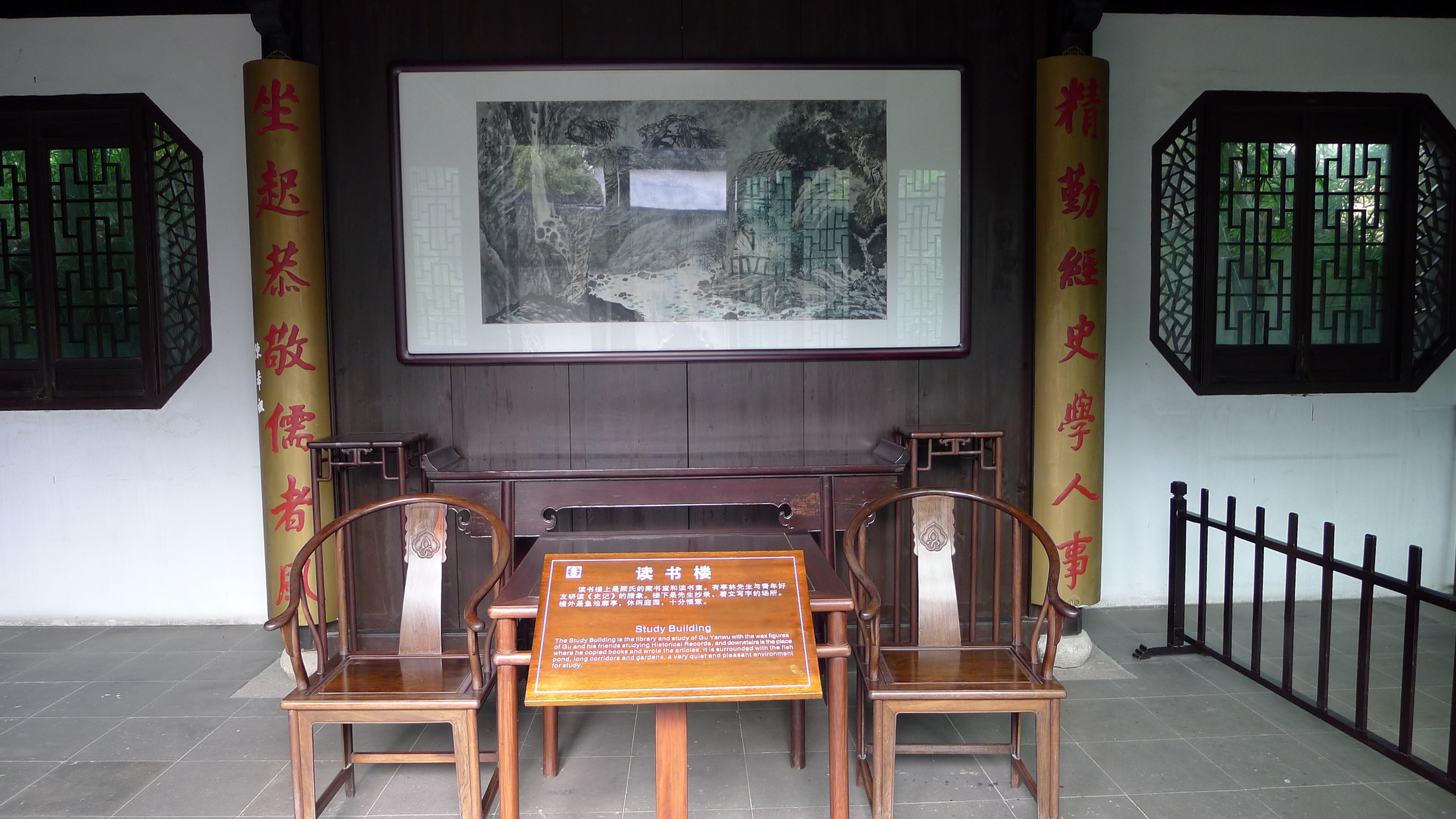
Study

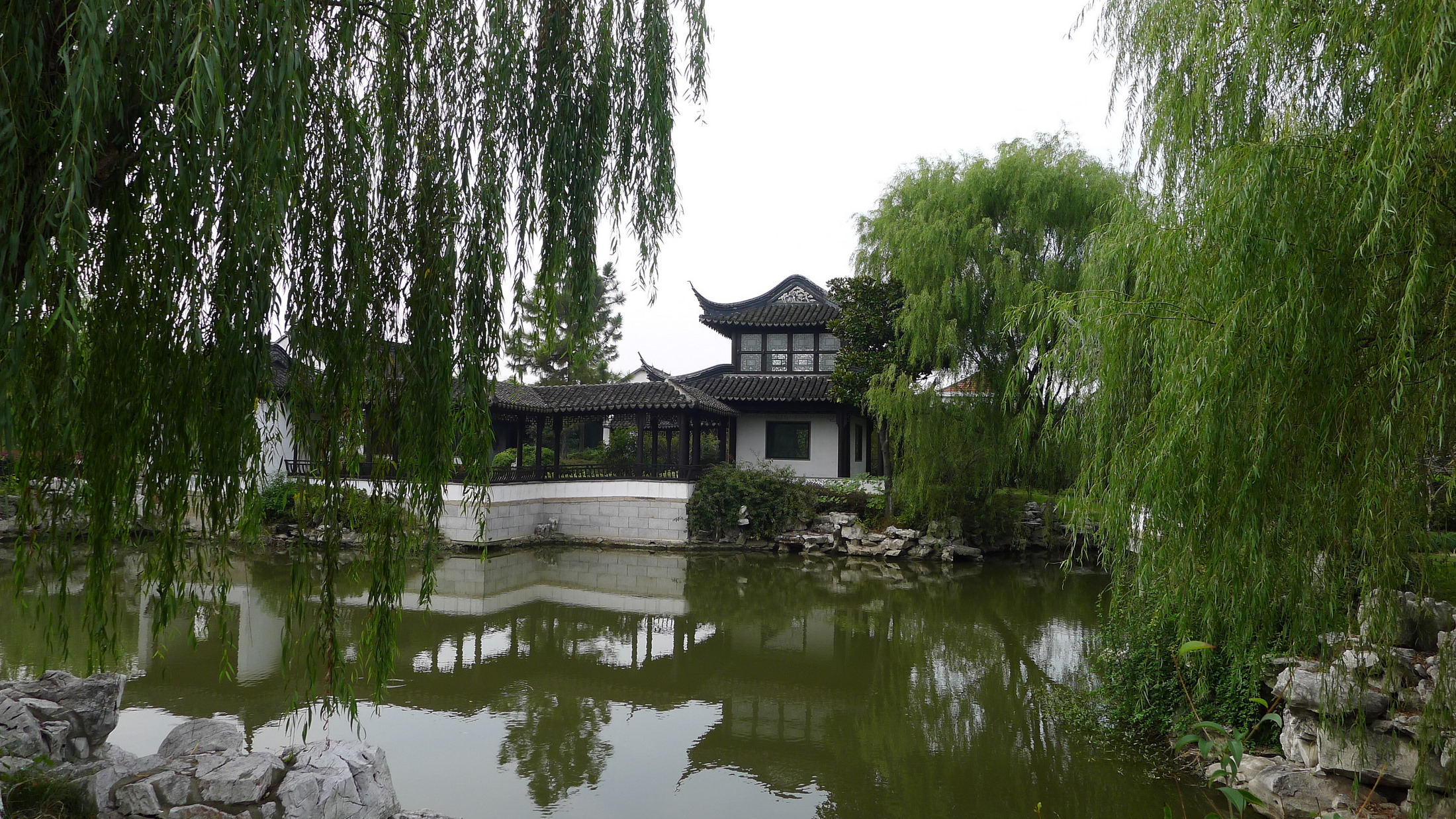
Gu Garden

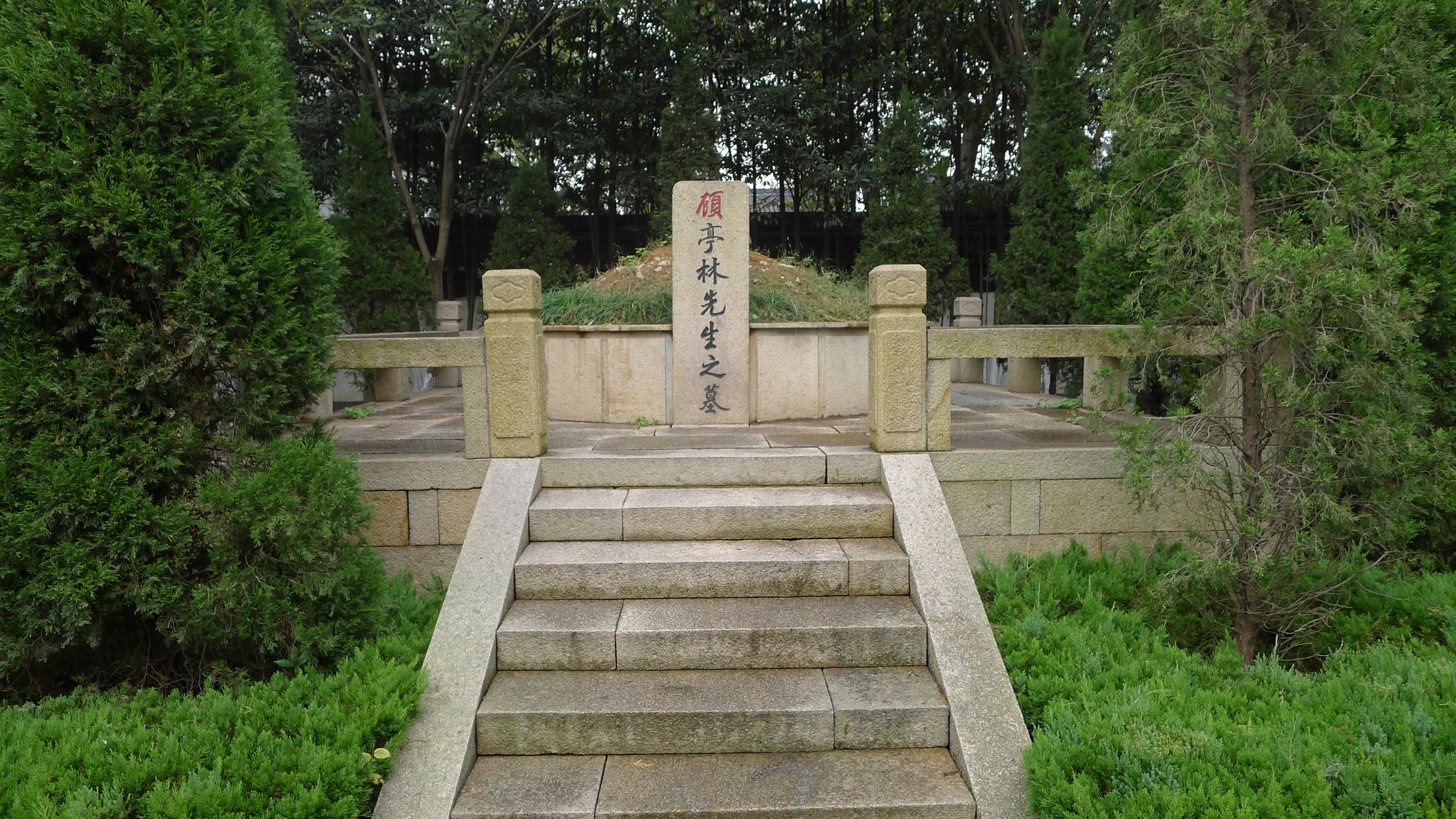
Grave of Gu Yanwu

== Thousand Lamp Museum ==
A unique exhibition with the town's namesake is Qiandeng Guan (Thousand Lamp Museum), with more than one thousand lamps, dated as early as Neolithic Age to modern times, spanning more than five thousand years.

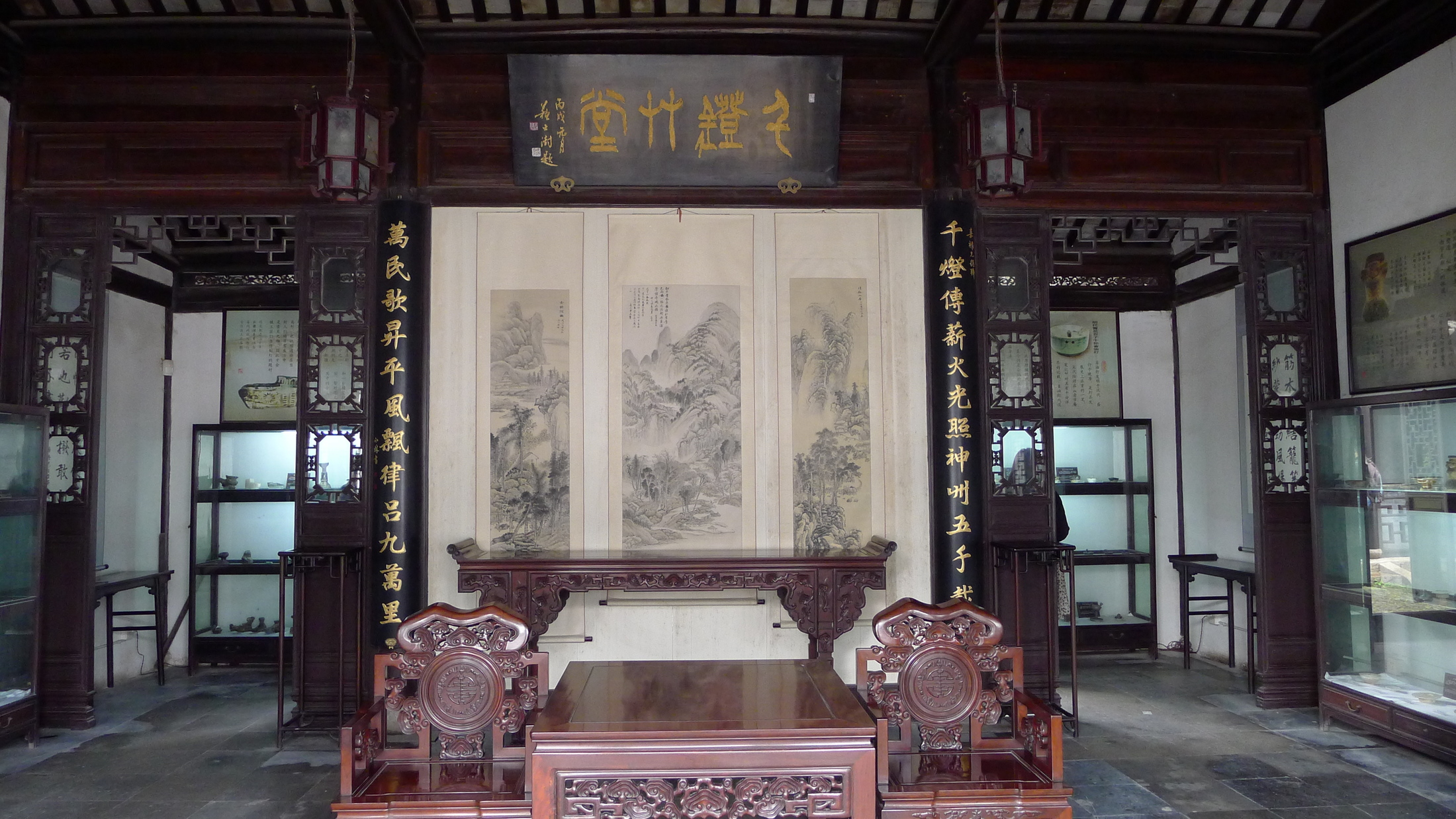
Thousand Lamp Museum

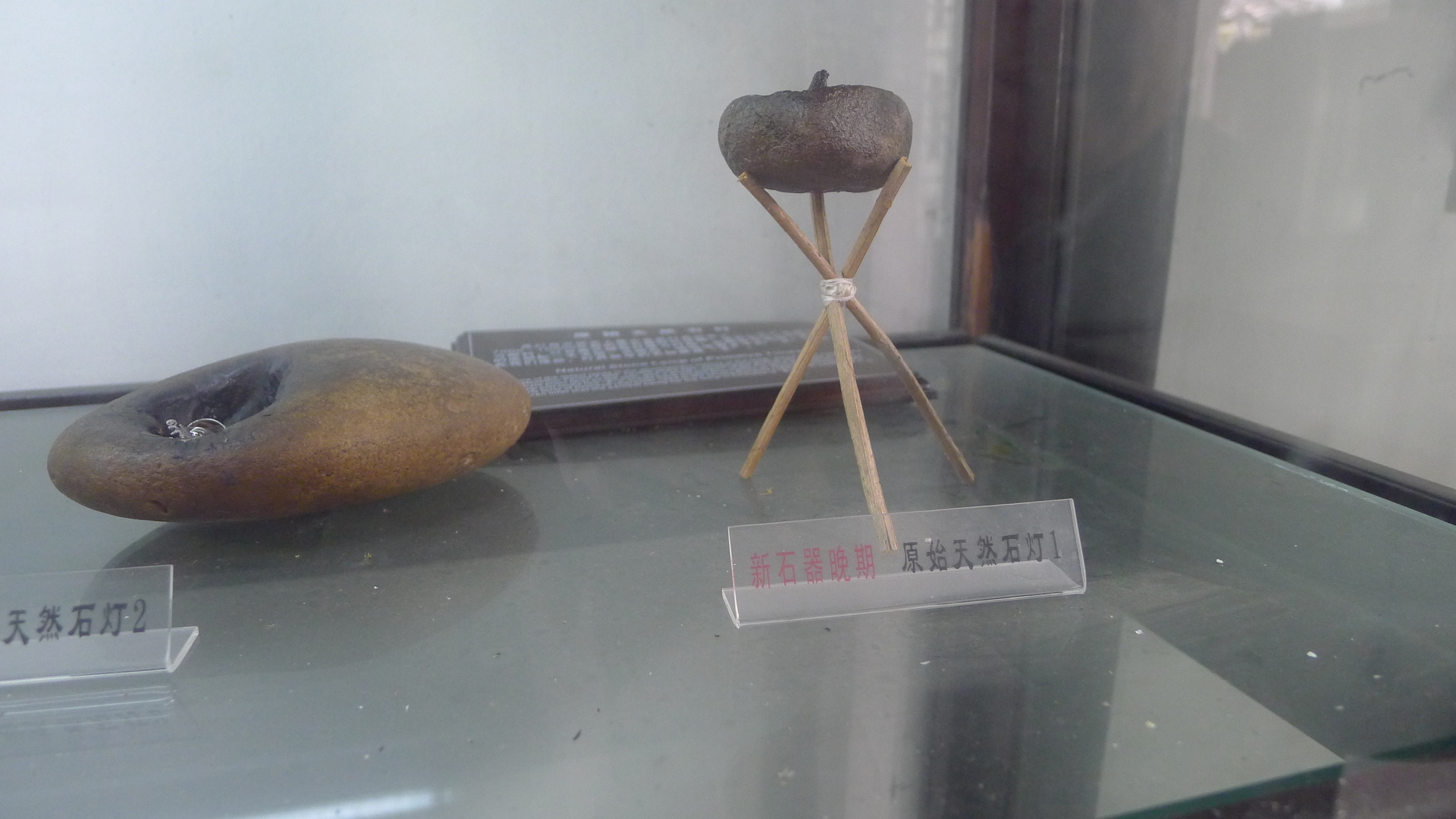
Qiandeng Museum Neolithic stone lamp

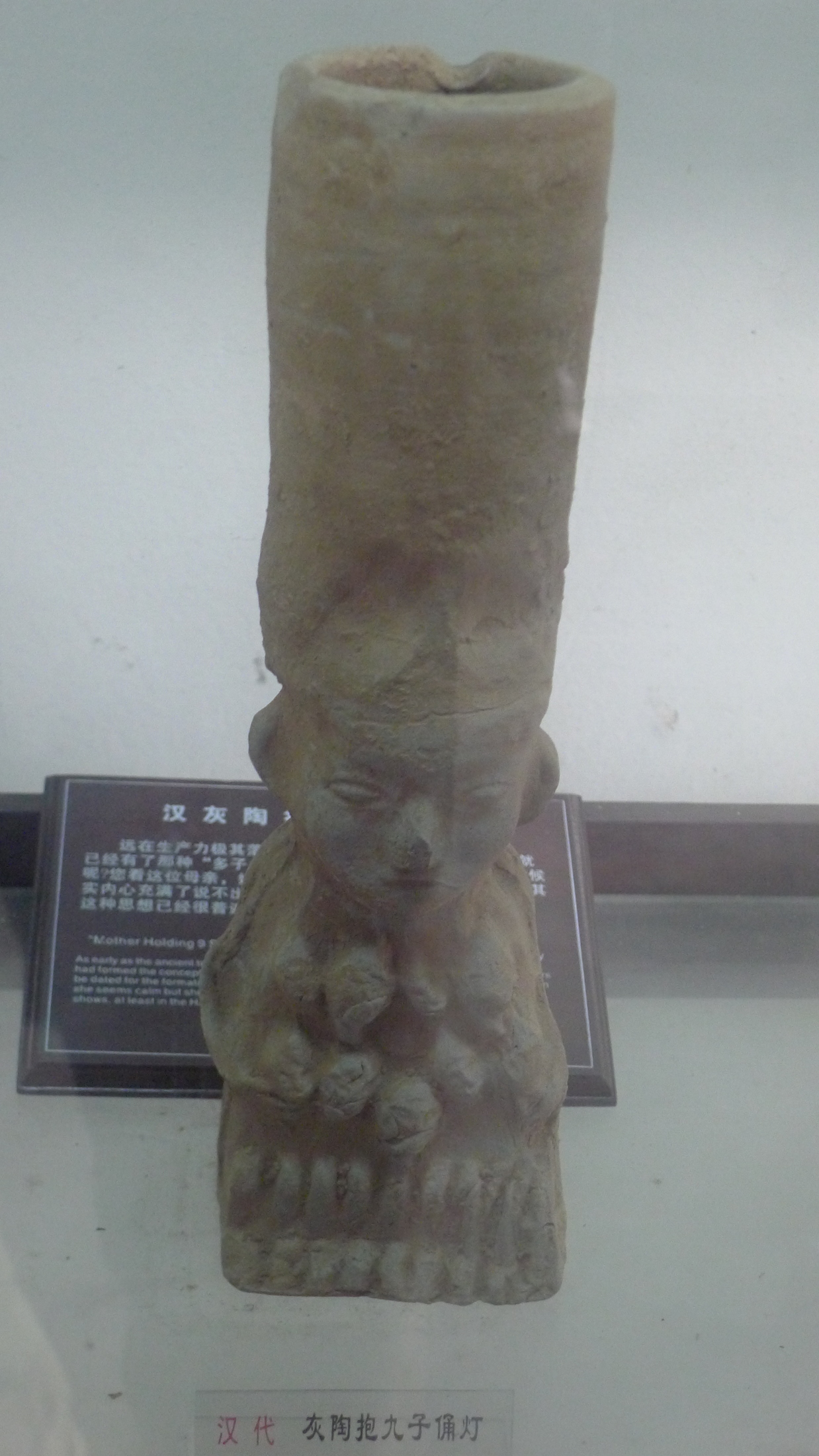
Han Dynasty Pottery lamp feathering a mother holding several babies

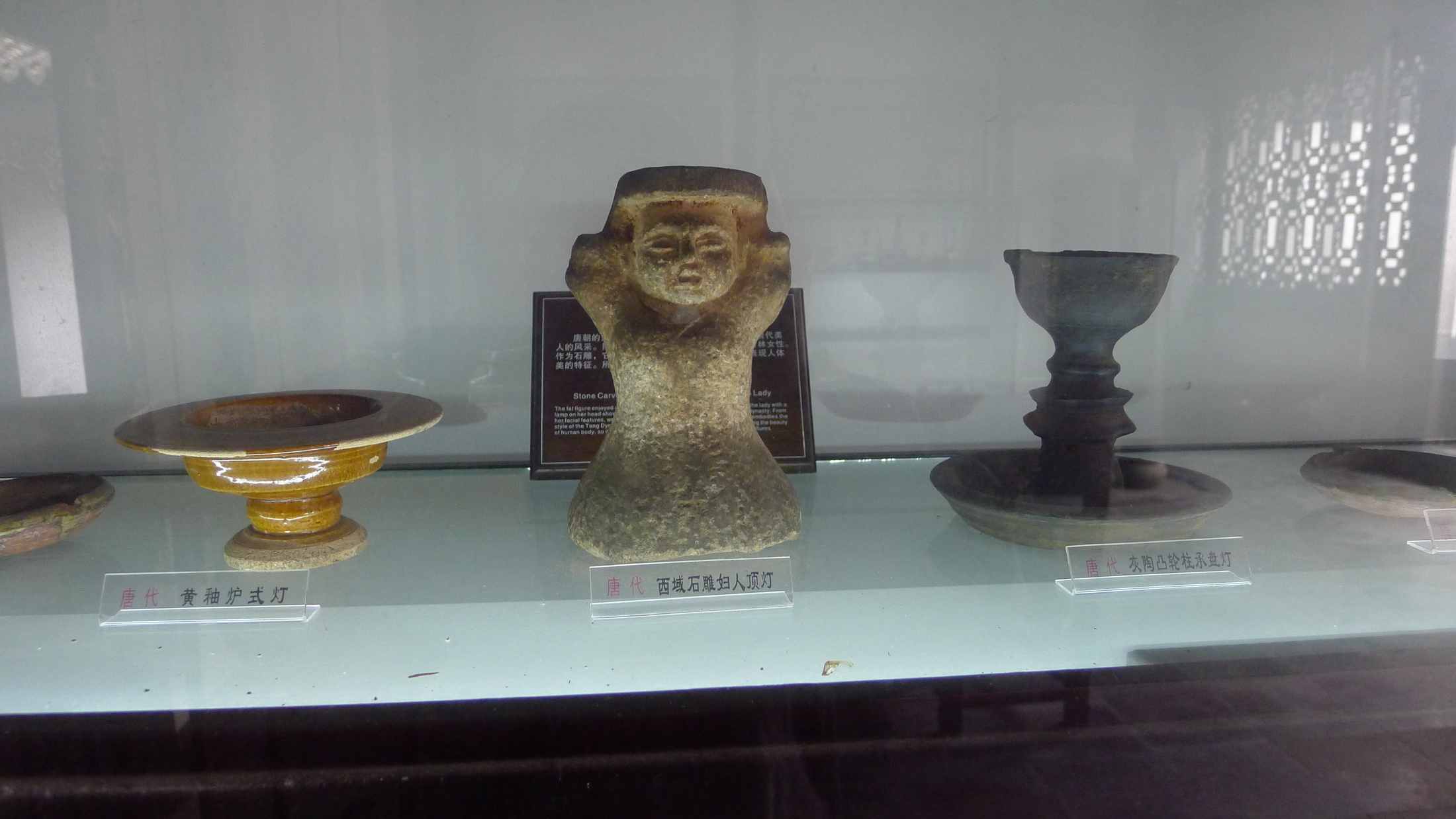
Tang Dynasty lamp from the Western Region

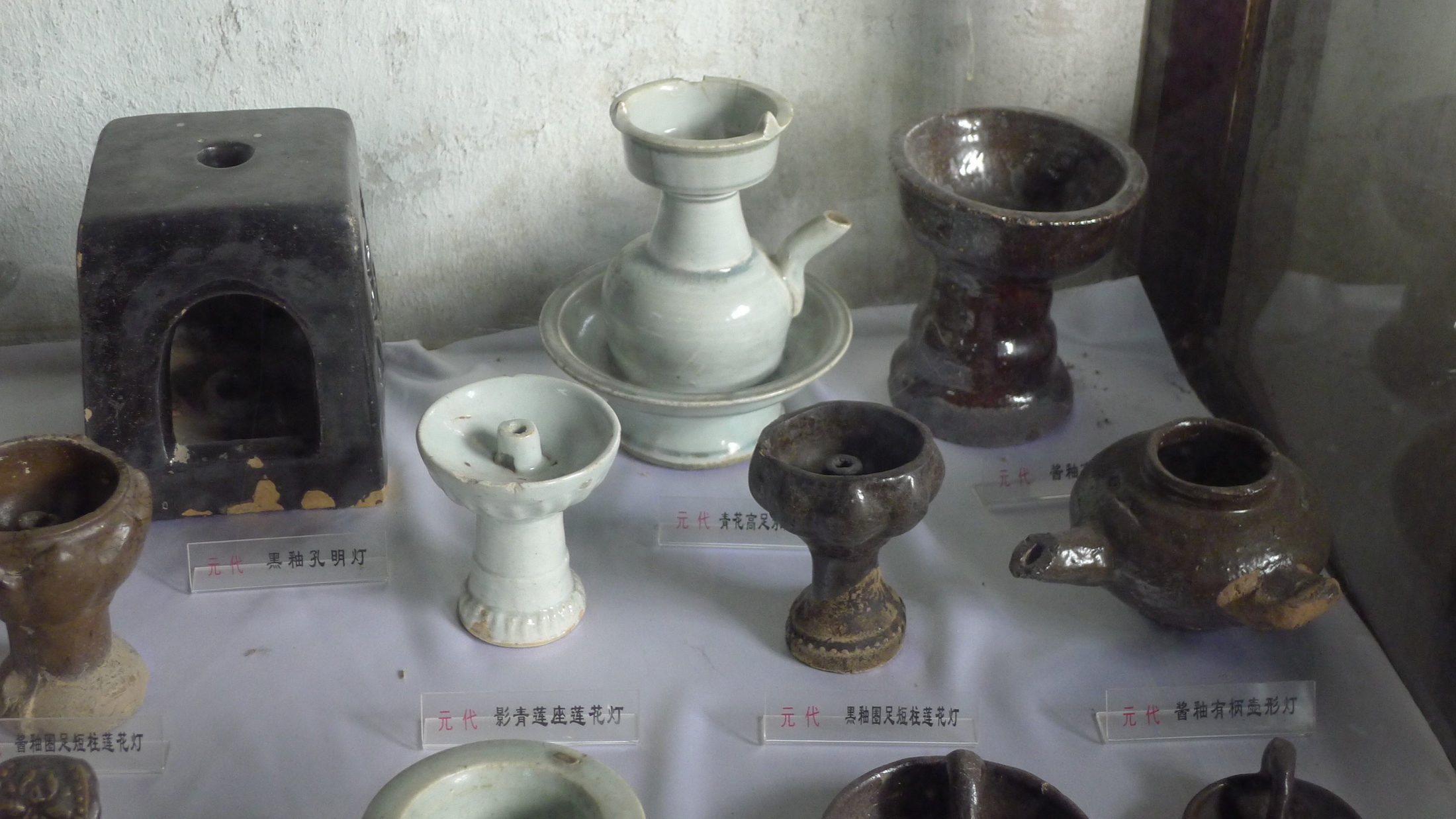
Yuan Dynasty lamp

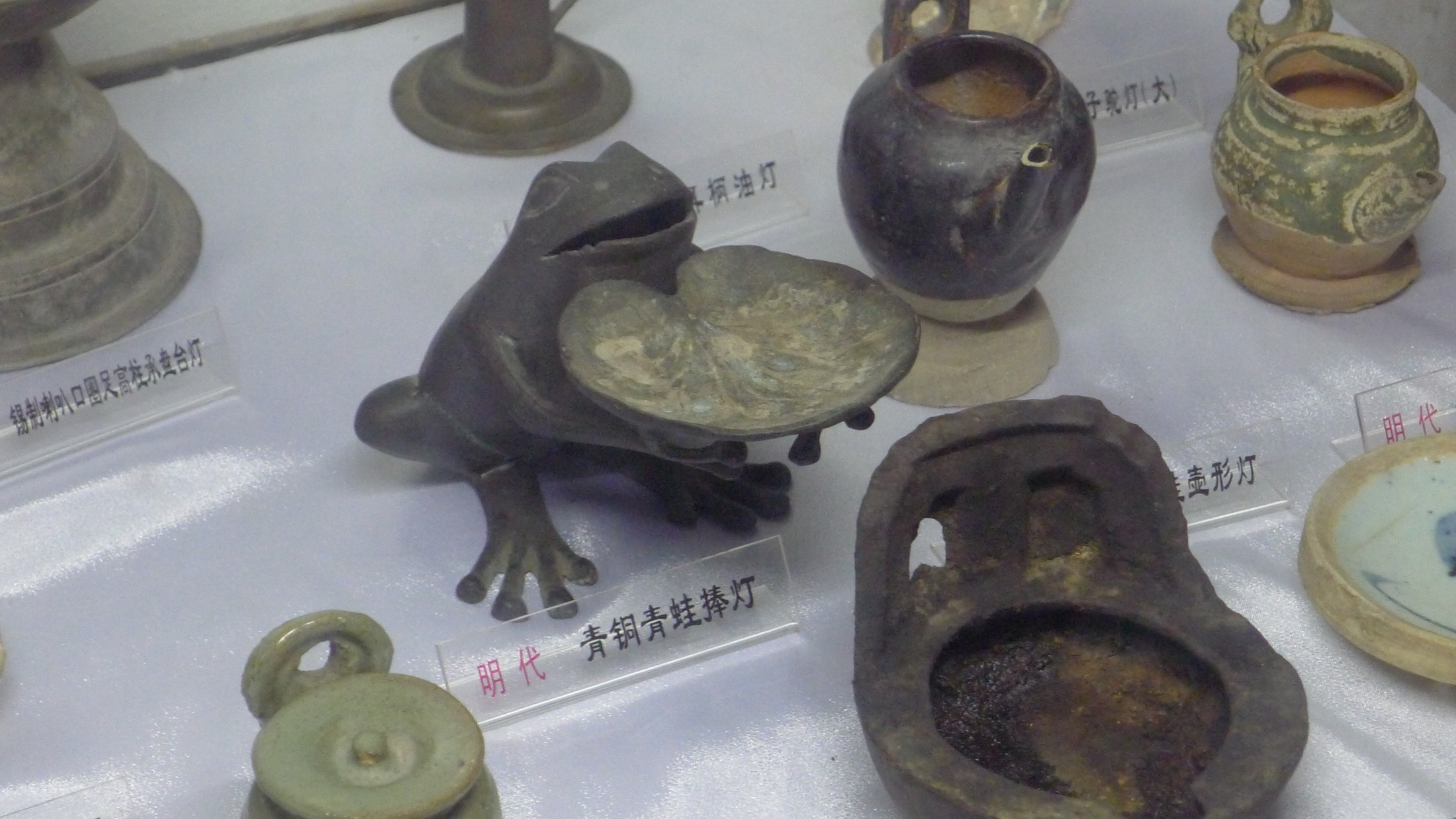
Ming Dynasty bronze lamp
