= Wu Yu (Song dynasty) =

Song dynasty philologist

Wu Yu 吳域 (c. 1100-1154) was an early and important Chinese philologist and phonologist and author of the 韻補 Yunbu, in which he noted the historical change of pronunciation of Shijing rhymes.
