= Pan Lei =

Chinese writer and scholar

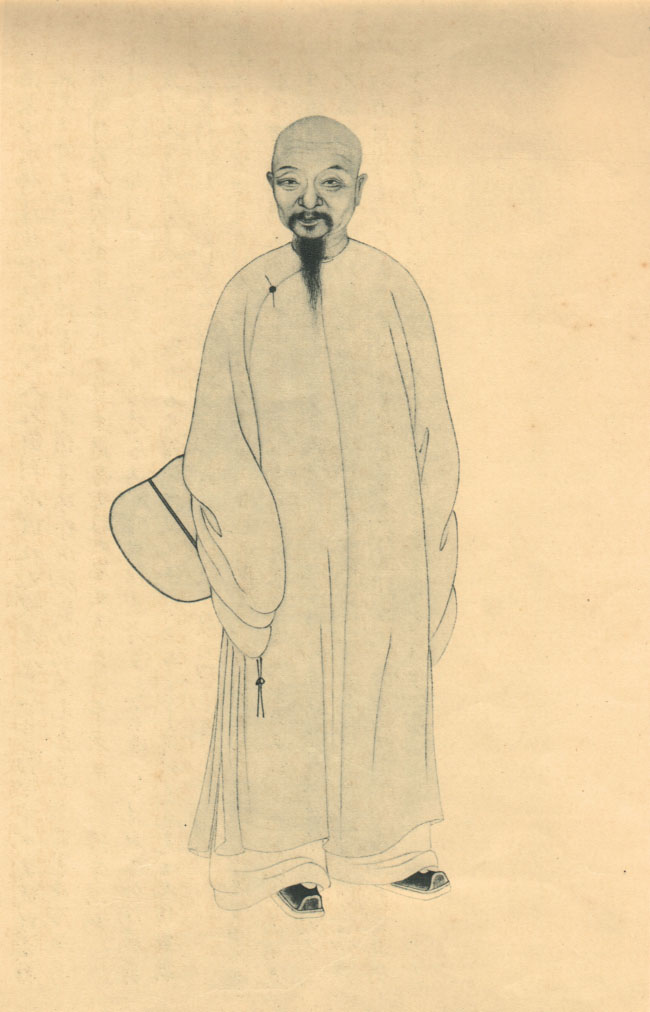
Pan Lei.

Pan Lei (Chinese: 潘耒; pinyin: Pān Lěi; 1646–1708) was a Qing dynasty scholar. He wrote the prefaces for a number of works that appeared in his time. In the preface to writer Qu Dajun's book Guangdong Xinyu, which is widely regarded as a valuable source on the economic and social conditions of Guangdong in 1700, Pan wrote about the beauty, natural resources, and unique history of East Guangdong. Pan was also involved in the study of mathematics. In the preface to Mei Wending's Fangchenglun, a treatise on linear algebra written in 1690, he wrote:

Although mathematics is the last of the Six Arts (liui ), it has wide applications. Without mathematics, it is impossible to understand the measurement of Heaven and the survey of the Earth; it is impossible to regulate taxes and to manage finances; it is impossible to raise armies and dispose troops; it is impossible to administer civil engineering.

Pan Lei's collected works also included the opinions of women who believed that poetry writing was considered unnecessary for women, which led to their works being kept secret.
