= Eastern Han Chinese =

Form of Chinese spoken in the Eastern Han period

- Later Han Chinese
- Native to: China
- Era: Eastern Han dynasty
- Language family: Sino-Tibetan: Sinitic; Chinese; Eastern Han Chinese
- Early form: Old Chinese
- Writing system: Clerical script

Language codes
- ISO 639-3: –
- Glottolog: late1251 Late Han Chinese
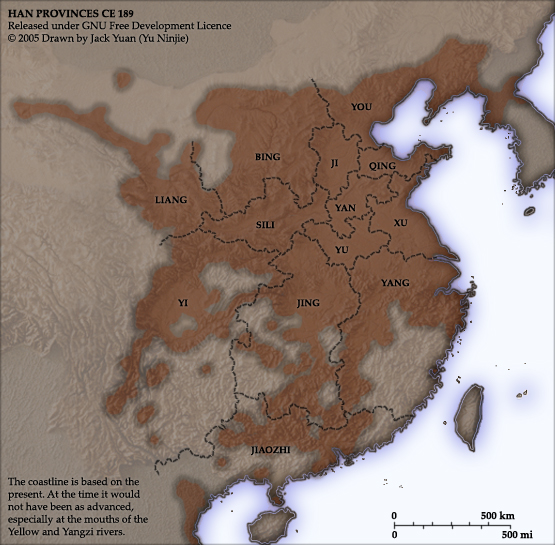
- Provinces of the Han dynasty c. 189 AD

Chinese name
- Traditional Chinese: 晚期上古漢語
- Simplified Chinese: 晚期上古汉语
- Literal meaning: Late Old Chinese
Transcriptions
Standard Mandarin
- Hanyu Pinyin: Wǎnqí shànggǔ hànyǔ
Southern Min
- Tâi-lô: Āu-kî siōng-kóo Hàn-gú

Eastern Han Chinese, or Later Han Chinese, is the stage of the Chinese language attested in poetry and glosses from the Eastern Han period (1st–3rd centuries AD). It is considered an intermediate stage between Old Chinese and the Middle Chinese of the 7th-century Qieyun rime dictionary. Min varieties are thought to be descended from southeastern dialects of this period.

Schuessler (2009) remarks that Later Han Chinese, as reconstructed by him, "could, with hindsight, be considered Middle Han Chinese of the first centuries BC and AD".

== Sources ==
The rhyming practice of Han poets has been studied since the Qing period as an intermediate stage between the Classic of Poetry of the Western Zhou period and Tang poetry. The definitive reference was compiled by Luo Changpei and Zhou Zumo in 1958. This work identifies the rhyme classes of the period, but leaves the phonetic value of each class open.

During the Eastern Han, Confucian scholars were bitterly divided between different versions of the classics: the officially recognized New Texts, and rediscovered versions written in a pre-Qin script known as the Old Texts. To support their challenge to the orthodox position on the classics, Old Text scholars produced many philological studies. Many of these works contain remarks of various types on the pronunciation of various words. The sources with the most glosses are the Shiming, a dictionary of classical terms, Xu Shen's Shuowen Jiezi (c. 100 AD), a study of the history and structure of Chinese characters, and Zheng Xuan's commentaries on various classics.

Buddhism also expanded greatly in China during the Eastern Han period. Buddhist missionaries, beginning with An Shigao in AD 148, began translating Buddhist texts into Chinese. These translations include transcriptions in Chinese characters of Sanskrit and Prakrit vocabulary, which were first systematically mined for evidence of the evolution of Chinese phonology by Edwin G. Pulleyblank.

The Shiming glosses were collected and studied by Nicholas Bodman. Weldon South Coblin collected all the remaining glosses and transcriptions, and used them in an attempt to reconstruct an intermediate stage between Old Chinese and Middle Chinese, both represented by the reconstructions of Li Fang-Kuei. Axel Schuessler included reconstructed pronunciations (under the name Later Han Chinese) in his dictionary of Old Chinese.

The customary writing style of the period was strongly modelled on the classics, and thus provides only occasional glimpses of contemporary grammar. Some works, while generally following the conventional archaizing style, contain passages in a more colloquial style thought to reflect contemporary speech, at least in part. Many such examples are found in translated Buddhist literature, particularly direct speech. Similarly, Zhao Qi's commentary on Mencius includes paraphrases of the classic written for the benefit of novice students, and therefore in a more contemporary style. Similar passages are also found in the commentaries of Wang Yi, Zheng Xuan and Gao You.

== Dialects ==
Major Han-period dialect groups inferred from the Fangyan

Several texts contain evidence of dialectal variation in the Eastern Han period. The Fangyan, from the start of the period, discusses variations in regional vocabulary. By analysing the text, Paul Serruys identified six dialect areas: a central area centred on the Central Plain east of Hangu Pass, surrounded by northern, eastern, southern and western areas, and a southeastern area to the south and east of the lower Yangtze. Distinct rhyme systems of the Han period poets identified by Luo and Zhou broadly correspond to these dialect areas.

The most influential dialect was the Qin–Jin dialect, from the western group, reflecting the ascendancy of the state of Qin. Second was the Chu dialect, from the southern group, which spread both to the south and to the east. These two dialects were also the principal sources of the Han standard language. The central dialects of the area of former states of Lu, Song and Wei were the most conservative. The dialects of the eastern area, which had been more recently and slowly sinified, include some non-Chinese vocabulary.

The Eastern Han glosses come from 11 sites, all to the north of the Huai River. They often show marked phonological differences. Many of them exhibit mergers that are not found in the 7th-century Qieyun or in many modern varieties. The exception is the Buddhist transcriptions, which were made in the region of Luoyang (in the western part of the central dialect area), suggesting that the later varieties descend from Han-period varieties spoken in this area.

The southeastern dialects are not reflected in Eastern Han texts. They were known as Wu (吳) or Jiangdong (江東) dialects in the Western Jin period, when the writer Guo Pu described them as quite distinct from other varieties. Jerry Norman called these Han-era southeastern dialects Old Southern Chinese, and suggested that they were the source of common features found in the oldest layers of modern Yue, Hakka and Min varieties.

== Phonology ==
Eastern Han Chinese syllables consisted of an initial consonant, optional medial glides, a vowel and an optional coda.

=== Initial consonants ===
The consonant clusters postulated for Old Chinese had generally disappeared by the Eastern Han period.

Initial consonants in Eastern Han dialects
		Labial	Dental	Sibilant	Palatal	Velar	Laryngeal
Stop or affricate	voiceless	*p	*t	*ts	(*tɕ)	*k	*ʔ
Stop or affricate	aspirate	*pʰ	*tʰ	*tsʰ	(*tɕʰ)	*kʰ	
Stop or affricate	voiced	*b	*d	*dz	(*dʑ)	*ɡ	
Nasal	voiceless	(*m̥)	(*n̥)			(*ŋ̊)	
Nasal	voiced	*m	*n			*ŋ	
Lateral or fricative	voiceless		(*l̥)	*s	(*ɕ)	*x	
Lateral or fricative	voiced		*l	*z	(*ʑ)	(*ɣ)	

One of the major changes between Old Chinese and Middle Chinese was palatalization of initial dental stops and (in some environments) velar stops, merging to form a new series of palatal initials. Several Eastern Han varieties show either or both of these palatalizations. However, Proto-Min, which branched off during the Han period, has palatalized velars but not dentals. The retroflex stops and sibilants of Middle Chinese are not distinguished from plain stops and sibilants in the Eastern Han data.

There is some uncertainty whether the Middle Chinese initials g-, h- and hj- can all be derived from a single Old Chinese initial *ɡ-, or whether an additional fricative initial *ɣ- or *ɦ- must be reconstructed. Most Eastern Han dialects have a single initial *ɡ- in such words, but some of them distinguish *ɡ- and *ɣ-.

Some Eastern Han dialects show evidence of the voiceless sonorant initials postulated for Old Chinese, but they had disappeared by the Eastern Han period in most areas. The Old Chinese voiceless lateral and nasal initials yielded a *tʰ initial in eastern dialects and *x in western ones. By the Eastern Han, the Old Chinese voiced lateral had also evolved to *d or *j, depending on syllable type. The gap was filled by Old Chinese *r, which yielded Eastern Han *l and Middle Chinese l. In some Eastern Han dialects, this initial may have been a lateral tap or flap [ɺ].

=== Medial glides ===
Most modern reconstructions of Old Chinese distinguish labiovelar and labiolaryngeal initials from the velar and laryngeal series. However, the two series are not separated in Eastern Han glosses, suggesting that Eastern Han Chinese had a *-w- medial like Middle Chinese. Moreover, this medial also occurs after other initials, including syllables with Old Chinese *-u- and *-o- before acute codas (*-n, *-t and *-j), which had broken to *-wə- and *-wa- respectively. Most OC reconstructions include a medial *-r- to account for Middle Chinese retroflex initials, division-II finals and some chongniu finals, and this seems to have still been a distinct phoneme in the Eastern Han period.

Since the pioneering work of Bernhard Karlgren, it has been common to project the palatal medial of Middle Chinese division-III syllables back to an Old Chinese medial *-j-, but this has been challenged by several authors, partly because Eastern Han Buddhist transcriptions use such syllables for foreign words lacking any palatal element. However, Coblin points out that this practice continued into the Tang period, for which a -j- medial is generally accepted. Scholars agree that the difference reflects a real phonological distinction, but there have been a range of proposals for its realization in early periods. The distinction is variously described in Eastern Han commentaries:

- He Xiu (何休; mid 2nd century) describes syllables that gave rise to Middle Chinese -j- as 'outside and shallow' (外而淺 wài ér qiǎn), while others are said to be 'inside and deep' (內而深 nèi ér shēn).
- Gao You (early 3rd century) describes the former as 'urgent breath' (急氣 jíqì) and the latter as 'slack breath' (緩氣 huǎnqì). Pan Wuyun and Zhengzhang Shangfang interpreted this as a vowel length distinction, but a more literal reading suggests a tenseness contrast.

=== Vowels ===
Most recent reconstructions of Old Chinese identify six vowels, *i, *ə, *u, *e, *a and *o. Eastern Han rhyming practice indicates that some of the changes found in Middle Chinese had already occurred:

- The vowels *i and *ə had merged before *-n, *-t and *-j.
- The finals *-ra and *-raj had merged (Middle Chinese -æ).
- The following splits and mergers of finals had occurred:

Old Chinese	Middle Chinese
*-ja	-jo
*-ja	-jæ
*-jaj	-jæ
*-jaj	-je
*-je	-je

The Middle Chinese finals -jo and -je occur with finals of all kinds, while -jæ occurs only after plain sibilant and palatal initials, with no known conditioning factor.

=== Codas ===
The Middle Chinese codas -p, -t, -k, -m and -ng are projected back onto Eastern Han Chinese. The Middle Chinese coda -n also appears to reflect *-n in most cases, but in some cases reflects vocalic codas in some Eastern Han varieties. Baxter and Sagart argue that these words had a coda *-r in Old Chinese, which became *-j in Shandong and adjacent areas, and *-n elsewhere.

Middle Chinese syllables with vocalic or nasal codas fell into three tonal categories, traditionally known as even, rising and departing tones, with syllables having stop codas assigned to a fourth "entering tone" category. André-Georges Haudricourt suggested that the Middle Chinese departing tone derived from an Old Chinese final *-s, later weakening to *-h. Several Buddhist transcriptions indicate that *-s was still present in the Eastern Han period in words derived from Old Chinese *-ts. Other departing tone syllables may have become *-h by the Eastern Han period, as suggested by a slight preference to use them to transcribe Indic long vowels. Based on Haudricourt's analysis of Vietnamese tones, Edwin Pulleyblank suggested that the Middle Chinese rising tone derived from Old Chinese *-ʔ. Syllables in this category were avoided when transcribing long vowels in the Eastern Han period, suggesting that they were shorter, possibly reflecting this final glottal stop.

== Grammar ==
In comparison with Warring States texts, colloquial Eastern Han texts display a massive increase in compound content words in clearly distinguished word classes. They also make much less use of function words in favour of periphrasis.

The monosyllabic words of the classical period were largely replaced by disyllabic compounds with clearly defined syntactic roles:

- verbs, such as bēi'āi 悲哀 'mourn', huānxǐ 歡喜 'rejoice', shūhǎo 姝好 'be beautiful' and fādòng 發動 'activate';
- nouns, such as shězhái 舍宅 'house', zhīshì 知識 'acquaintance', chùsuǒ 處所 'place', xíngtǐ 形體 'body' and rénmín 人民 'people';
- adverbs, such as dōulú 都盧 'all', shēnzì 身自 'personally', 'together' and ěrnǎi 爾乃 'then'.

The widespread use of measure words between numerals or demonstratives and nouns, a characteristic of the modern language, began in the Han period and became more extensive in the following Northern and Southern dynasties period.

Old Chinese had a range of personal pronouns, including case distinctions. In the Eastern Han, these were reduced to first person wǒ 我 and second person rǔ 汝. Similarly, the demonstratives were almost exclusively reduced to shì 是 'this', ěr 爾 'such' and bǐ 彼 'that'. Both kinds of pronouns were often used with plural suffixes -děng 等, -bèi 輩 and -cáo 曹. Most of the interrogatives of Old Chinese were replaced with periphrastic forms.

The demonstrative shì 是 also came to be used as a copular verb in sentences of the form A 是 B (as in modern Chinese), replacing the typical classical pattern A B 也 (yě). Unlike any other verb, shì 是 was not negated with bù 不 – the negative copula fēi 非 was retained from the classical language.

In classical texts, the particle qǐ 豈 marked a rhetorical question, for which a negative answer was expected, but in the Eastern Han it was a general question marker. At the same time, a new question marker níng 寧 appeared.
