= Kinnara =

Hindu and Buddhist mythological creature

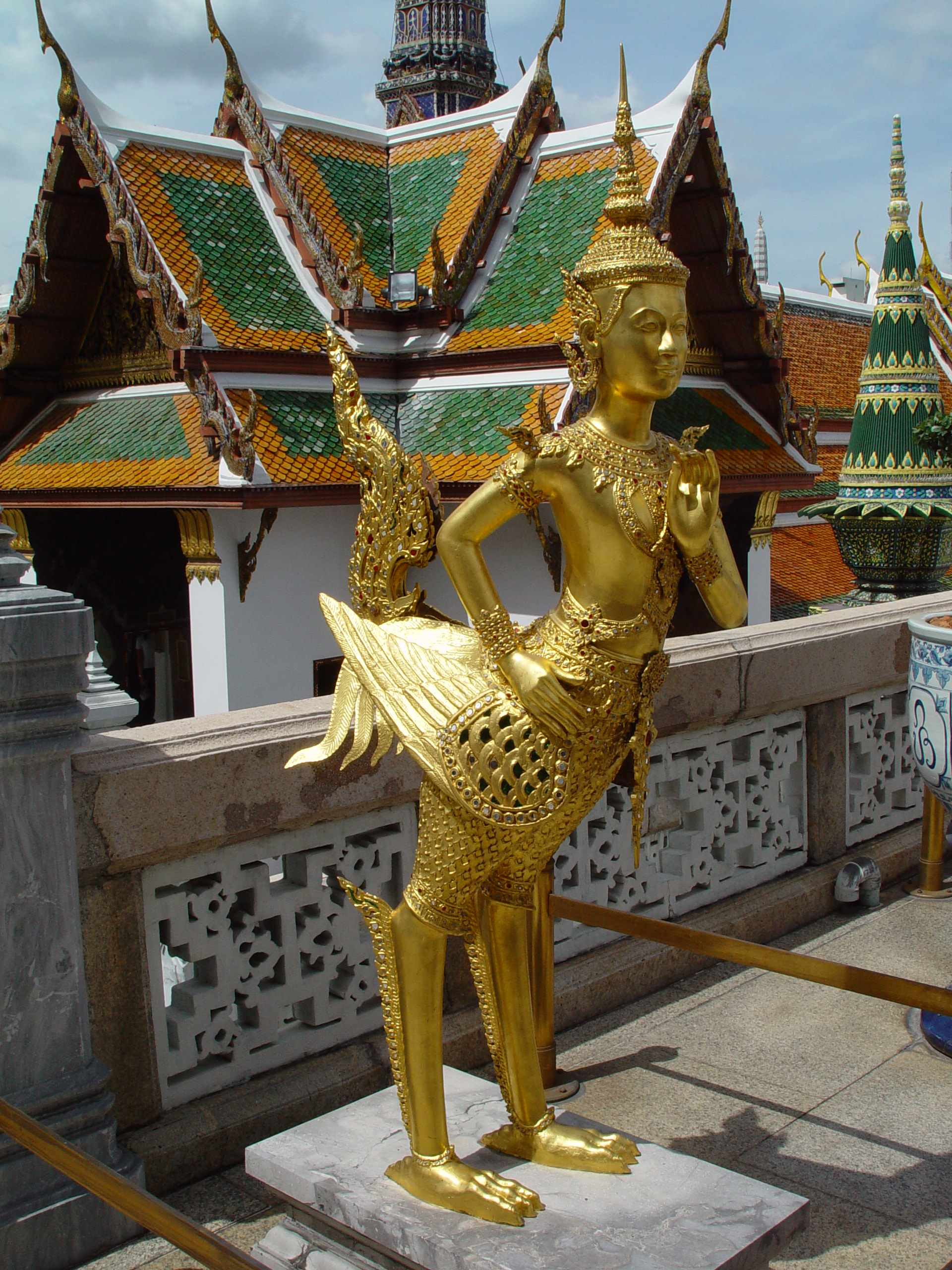
Statue of a kinnara in The Temple of the Emerald Buddha, Bangkok (Thailand).

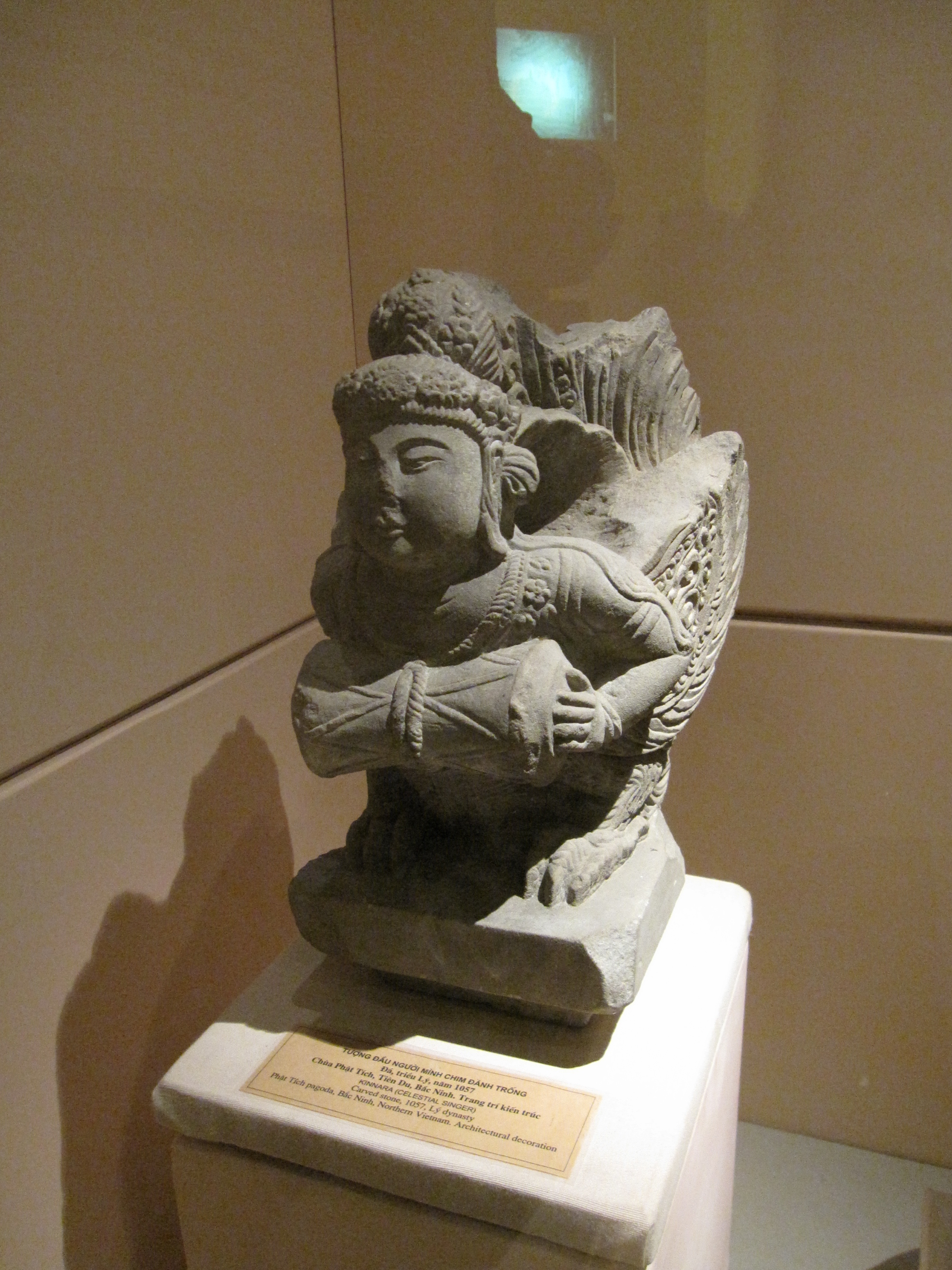
Kinnara statue of Lý dynasty, Vietnam

A Kinnara (Sanskrit: किन्नर) is a creature from Hindu and Buddhist mythology. They are described as part human and part bird, and have a strong association with music and love. Believed to come from the Himalayas, they often watch over the well-being of humans in times of trouble or danger. An ancient Indian string instrument is known as the Kinnari veena.

Their character is also clarified in the Adi Parva of the Mahabharata, where they say:

We are everlasting lover and beloved. We never separate. We are eternally husband and wife; never do we become mother and father. No offspring is seen in our lap. We are lover and beloved ever-embracing. In between us we do not permit any third creature demanding affection. Our life is a life of perpetual pleasures.

They are featured in a number of Buddhist texts, including the Jataka tales and Lotus Sutra. In Southeast Asian Buddhist mythology, kinnaris, the female counterpart of kinnaras, are depicted as half-bird, half-woman creatures. One of the many creatures that inhabit the mythical Himavanta, kinnaris have the head, torso, and arms of a woman and the wings, tail and feet of a swan. They are renowned for their dance, song and poetry, and are a traditional symbol of feminine beauty, grace and accomplishment.

Edward H. Schafer notes that in East Asian religious art, the kinnara is often confused with the Kalaviṅka, which is also a half-human, half-bird hybrid creature, but that the two are actually distinct and unrelated.

== Burma ==
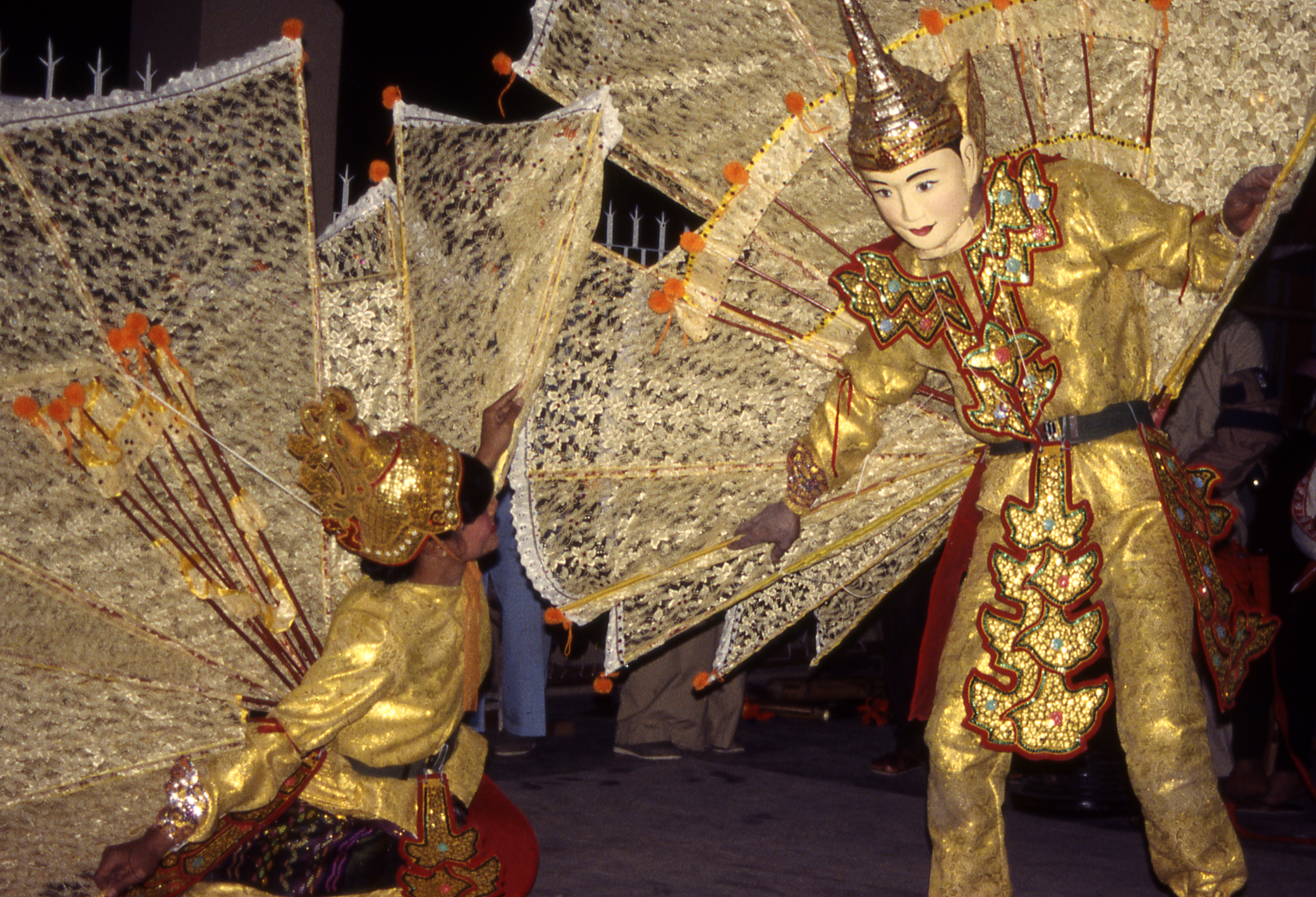
Shan kinnara and kinnari dance

In Burma (Myanmar), kinnara are called keinnaya or kinnaya (ကိန္နရာ [kèɪɰ̃nəjà]). Female kinnara are called keinnayi or kinnayi (ကိန္နရီ [kèɪɰ̃nəjì]). In Shan, they are ၵိင်ႇၼရႃႇ (Shan pronunciation: [kìŋ nǎ ràː]) and ၵိင်ႇၼရီႇ (Shan pronunciation: [kìŋ nǎ rì]) respectively. Burmese Buddhists believe that out of the 136 past animal lives of Buddha, four were kinnara. The kinnari is also one of the 108 symbols on the footprint of Buddha.

The flag of Kayah State (Karenni State) includes a depiction of the kinnara.

In Burmese art, kinnari are depicted with covered breasts. The Myanmar Academy Awards statue for Academy Award winners is of a kinnari. The kinnara and kinnari couple is considered the symbol of the Karenni people.

== Cambodia ==
In Cambodia, the kinnaras are known in the Khmer language as kenar (កិន្នរ, កិន្នរា; IPA: [keˈnɑː] or IPA: [ken nɑ ˈraː]). The female counterpart, the kinnari (កិន្នរី; IPA: [ken nɑ ˈrəj]), are depicted in Cambodian art and literature more often than the male counterparts. They are commonly seen carved into support figurines for the columns of post-Angkorian architecture. Kinnari are considered symbols of beauty and are skilled dancers.

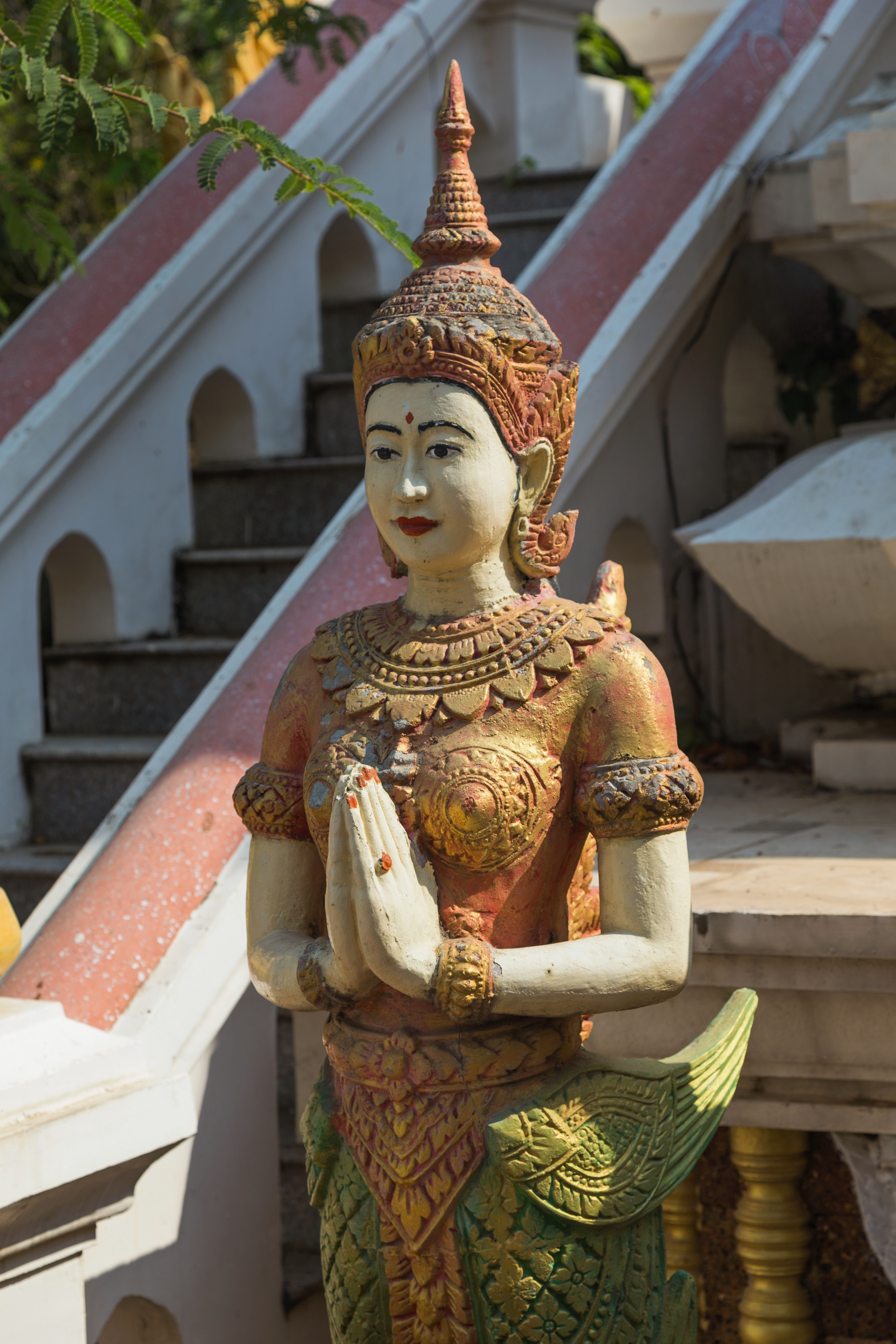
kinnari in front of the stupa in Wat Botum, Cambodia

The Kenorei is a character archetype in the repertoire of the Royal Ballet of Cambodia, appearing as mischievous groups that have a strong allurement. A classical dance titled Robam Kenorei depicts kinnaris playing in a lotus pond.

== China ==
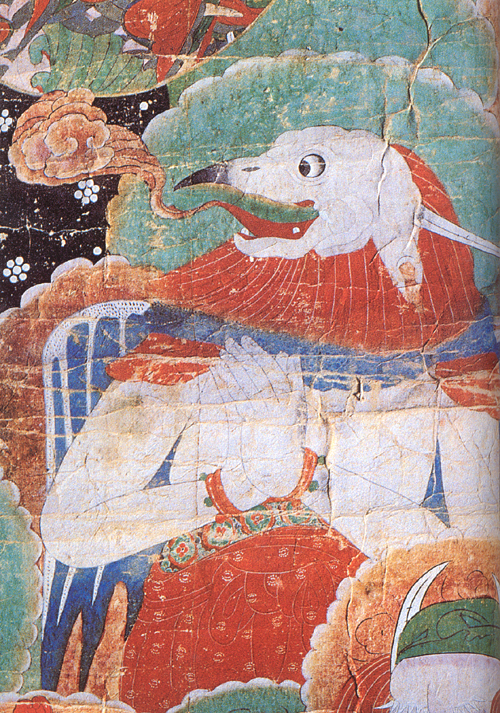
Kimnara - God of music

The jinnalaluo (also called kimnaras, feiren, and yeishen) were divine creatures with human bodies and animal's heads that were featured in Buddhist mythology. These beings resemble human bodies and have the heads of animals, most notably horses or birds.

They are celestial musicians, whose music is said to fill Heaven. They play a variety of instruments and are linked to a very ancient Indian art form, where they are portrayed as birds-of-paradise.

== India ==
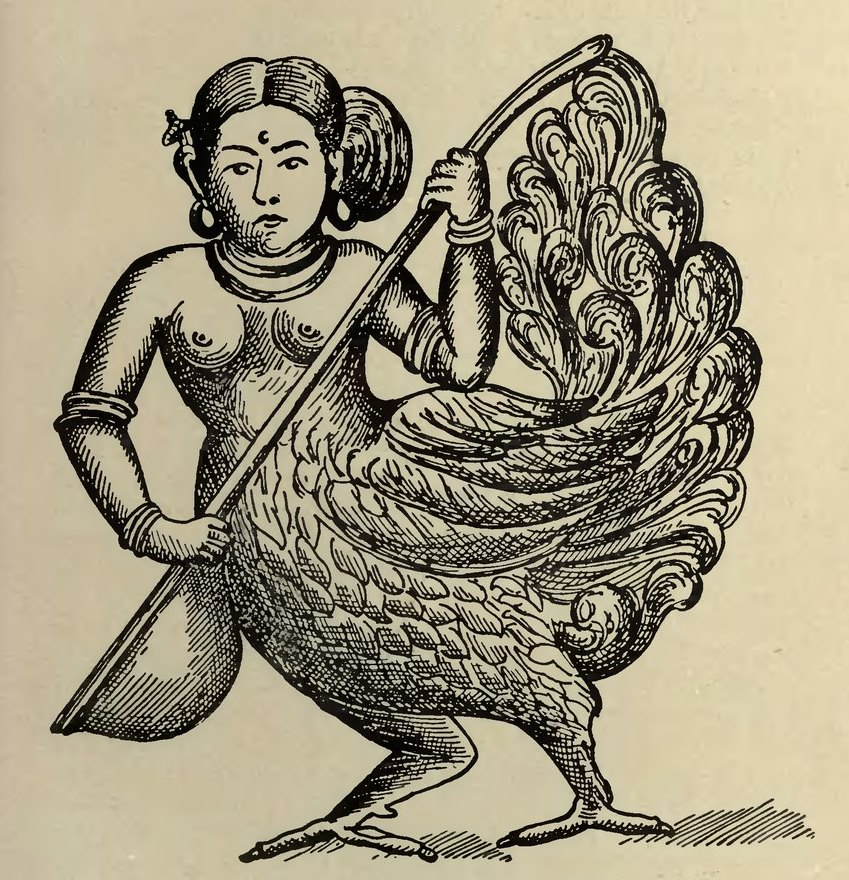
Picture of Kinnari sculpture from Rameswaram.

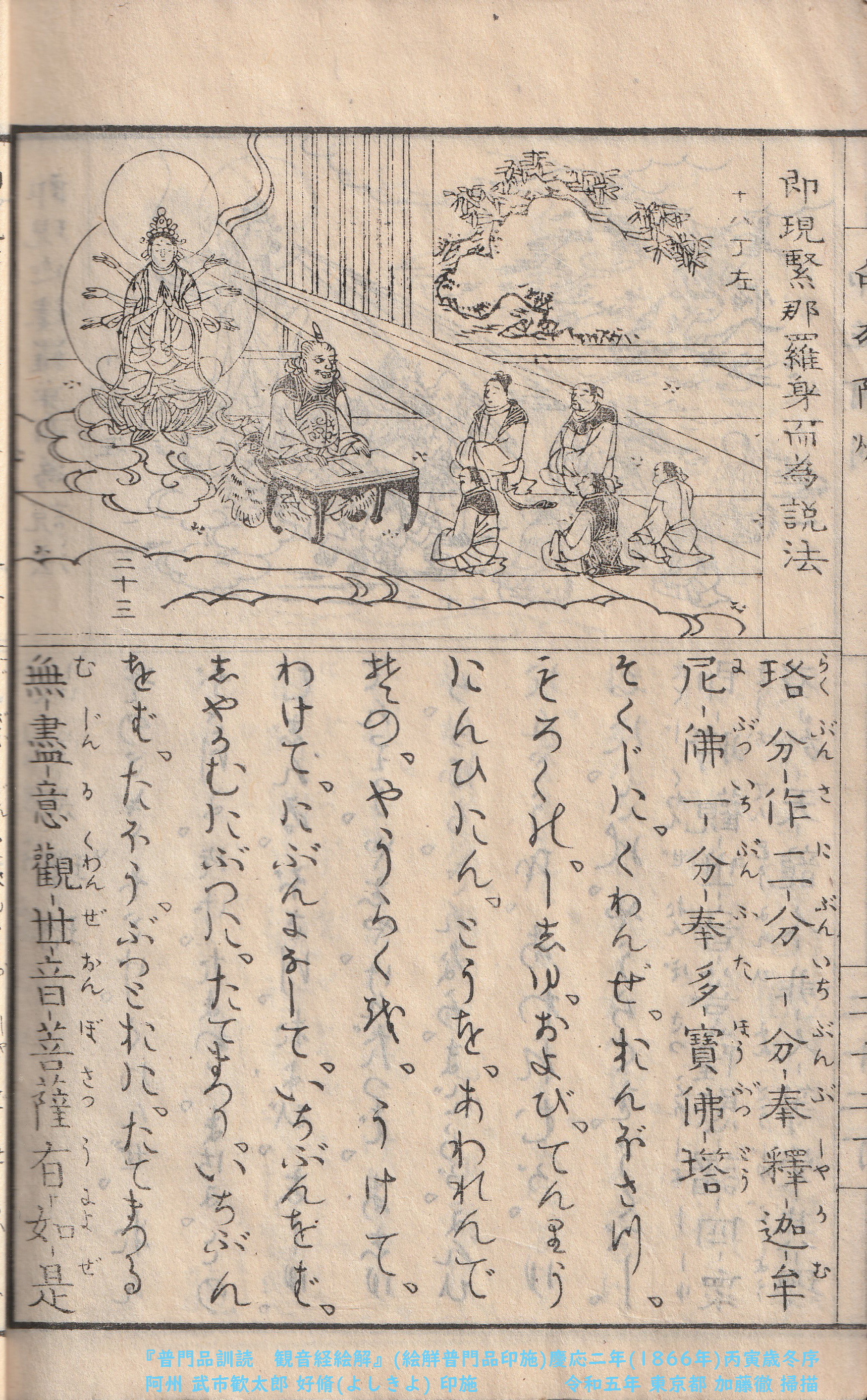
An illustration from an 1866 Japanese book. Kinnara, who is an incarnation of Bodhisattva Kannon in this scene, gives a Buddhism sermon to folks.

In Hindu mythology, kinnara is described as half-man, half-horse, and half-bird. The Vishnudharmottara describes Kinnara as half-man and half-horse, but the correct nature of kinnara as Buddhists understood is half-man and half-bird which is different from the centaur-like Kinnaras of the Hindu mythology. They are mentioned along with Devas, Gandharvas, Charanas, Siddhas, and Apsaras in mythological texts. The figure of Yaksha with a horse head illustrated in Bodh Gaya sculptures in however a kinnari as the Jataka illustrating it treats her as a demi-god. According to the Jatakas, kinnaras are fairies and are shown as going in pairs noted for mutual love and devotion. In the Chanda kinnara Jataka the devotion of the Kinnarai to her wounded kinnara husband brings Indra on the scene to cure him from the wound. The kinnaras are noted for their long life.

The Jatakas describe the kinnaras as innocent and harmless, hop like birds, are fond of music and song, and with the female beating a drum and male playing on lute. Such harmless creatures are described in Jataka No.481 as being caught, put into cages, and thus presented to kings for their delight. In Jataka No.504, we have the autobiography of a kinnara who describes the kinnara class as human-like the wild things deem us; huntsmen call us goblins still. The kinnaras can sing, play the flute and dance with soft movements of the body. Kalidasa in his Kumara Sambhava describes them as dwelling in the Himalayas. kinnaras lived also over the hills of Pandaraka, Trikutaka, Mallangiri, Candapabbata, and Gandhamandana (Jataka No. 485). They were tender-hearted and Jataka No. 540 refers to the story of the kinnaras nursing a human baby whose parents have gone away to the woods. Yet, we find that they were looked upon as queer animals and were hunted, captured and presented to the kings as entertainment. Flowers formed their dress. Their food was flower pollen and their cosmetics were made of flower perfumes.

The depiction of kinnara in early Indian art is an oft-repeated theme. The ancient sculptures of Sanchi, Barhut, Amaravati, Nagarjunakonda, Mathura, and the paintings of Ajanta depict kinnaras invariably. Frequently, they are seen in the sculptures flanking the stupas. In this case, they hold garlands or trays containing flowers in their hands for the worship of the Stupas. Sometimes, the kinnaras appear in the sculptures holding garland in right hand and tray in the left hand. They also appear before Bodhi-Drumas, Dharmacakras, or playing a musical instrument. As such, the portrayal of kinnaras in early Indian sculpture art is very common.

== Indonesia ==
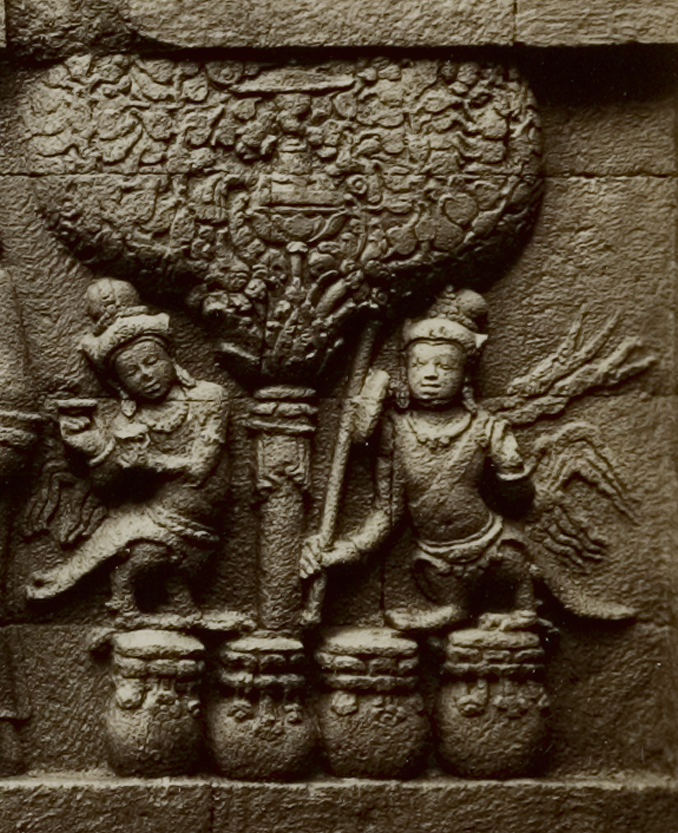
Kinnaras with cymbals and Alapini Vina from Borobudur, hidden base.

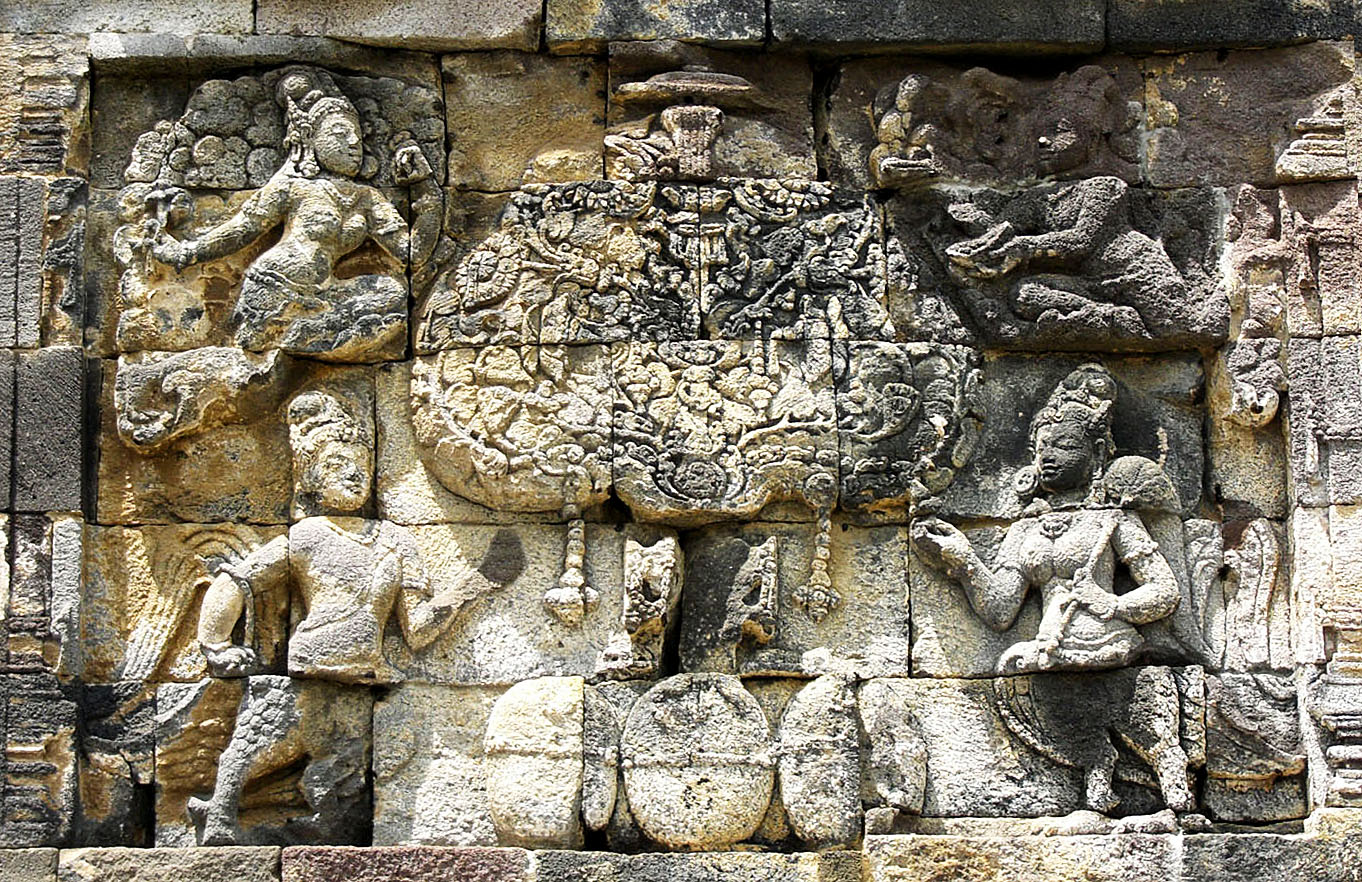
Kinnara (male), Kinnari (female), Apsara, and Devata guarding Kalpataru, the divine tree of life. 8th century Pawon temple, Java, Indonesia.

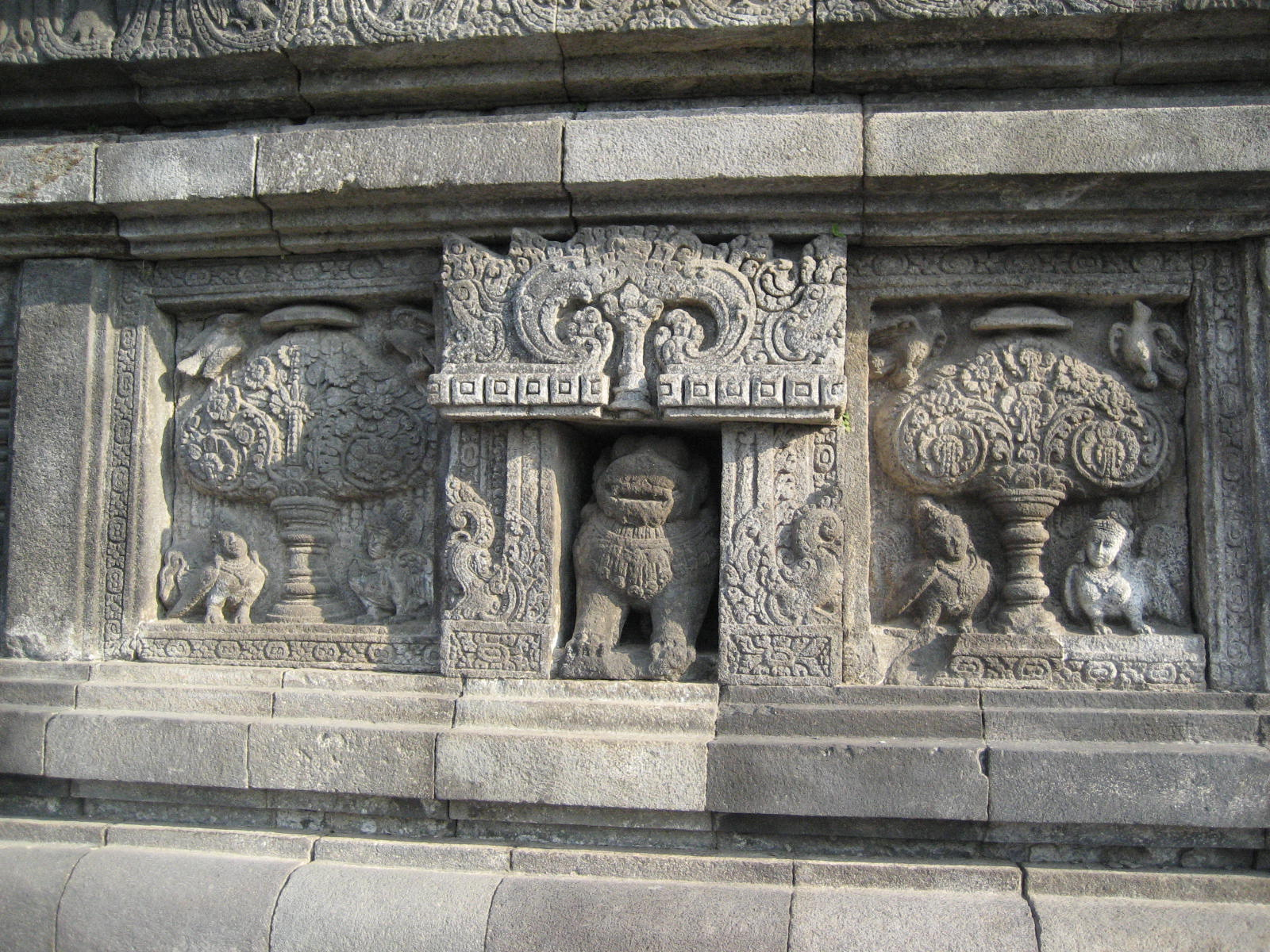
Kinnara inscription in Prambanan temple

The images of coupled kinnara and kinnari can be found in Borobudur, Mendut, Pawon, Sewu, Sari, and Prambanan temples. Usually, they are depicted as birds with human heads, or humans with lower limbs of birds. The pair of kinnara and kinnari usually is depicted guarding Kalpataru, the tree of life, and sometimes guarding a jar of treasure. A pair of Kinnara-Kinnari bas-reliefs of Sari temple is unique, depicting Kinnara as celestial humans with birds' wings attached to their backs, very similar to popular image of angels.

There are bas-relief in Borobudur depicting the story of the famous kinnari, Manohara.

== Philippines ==
In the pre-colonial Philippines, the Kinnara or Kinnari are symbolic of androgynous beauty and of a lover's devotion, ethereal beauty, and one's undying devotion towards a lover. Pre-colonial gold pieces have been found depicting such otherworldly beauty.

A golden image of Kinnari was excavated in Surigao at around 1981. It is a gold artefact that symbolises the feminine beauty for it is a half-woman, half- bird, and a religious significance for it encapsulates grace and accomplishment.

== Thailand ==
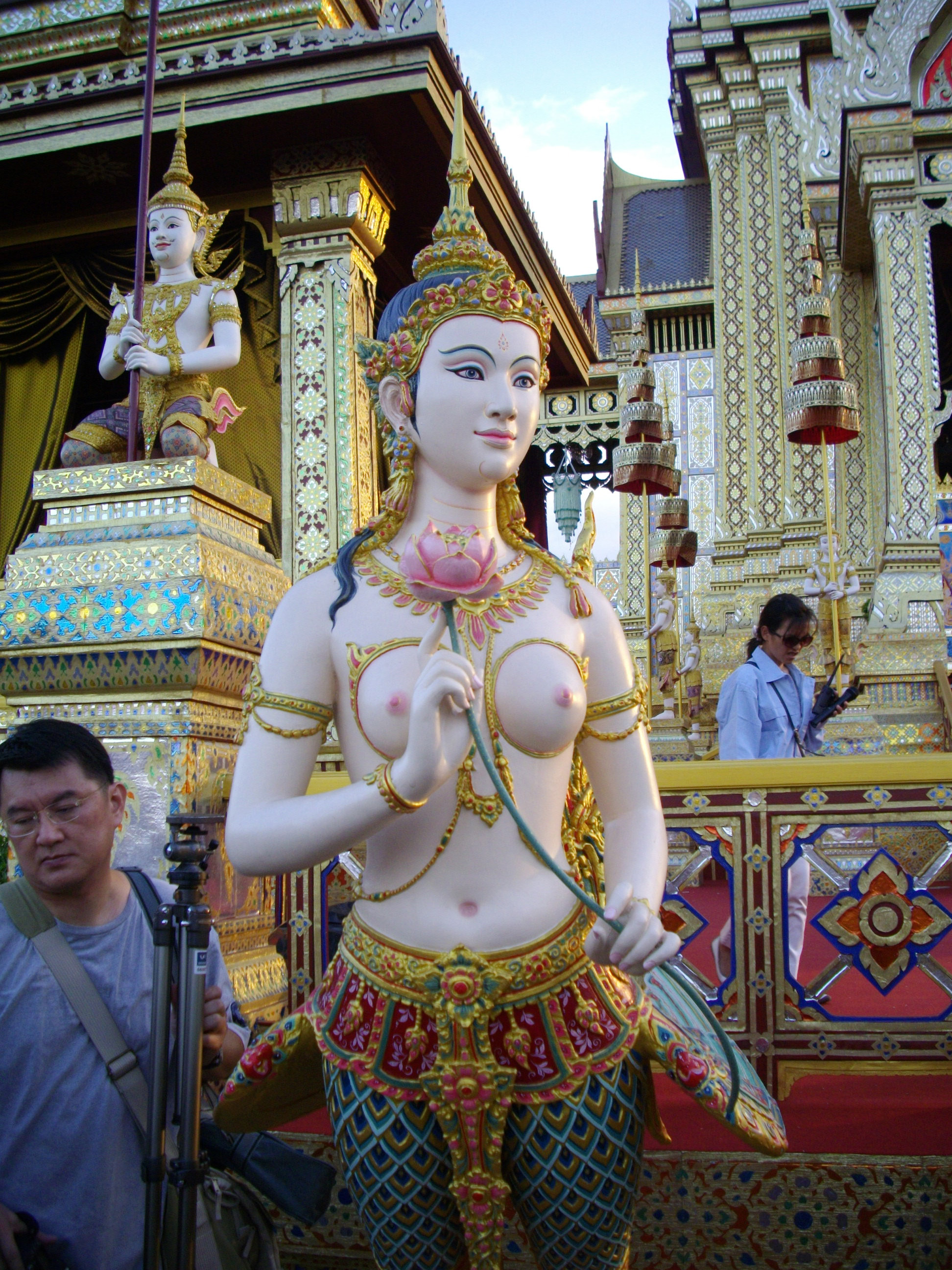
Sculpture of a kinnari which was decorated in the royal crematorium of Princess Galyani Vadhana at Sanam Luang, Bangkok, Thailand (2008).

The kinnari (Thai: กินรี), usually spelt 'kinnaree' as noted below, in Thai literature originates from India, but was modified to suit Thai culture. The Thai kinnari is depicted as a young woman wearing an angel-like costume. The lower part of the body is similar to a bird, and should enable her to fly between the human and the mystical worlds. The most popular portrayal of kinnaree in Thai art probably the golden figures of kinnaree adorned the Wat Phra Kaew in Bangkok, which describe a half-maiden, half-goose figure.

=== Manora ===
The most famous kinnari in Thailand is the figure known as Manora (Thai: มโนรา, derived from Manohara), a heroine in one of the stories collected in "Pannas Jataka" a Pali tome written by a Chiang Mai Buddhist monk and sage around AD 1450–1470. This is supposed to be a collection of 50 stories of the past lives of the Buddha, known to Buddhists as the Jataka. The specific tale about Manora the kinnaree was called Sudhana Jataka, after Prince Sudhana, the bodhisattva who was also the hero of the story and the husband of Manora.

== Tibet ==
In Tibet, the kinnara is known as the Miamchi (Tibetan: མིའམ་ཅི་, Wylie: mi'am ci) or 'shang-shang' (Tibetan: ཤང་ཤང, Wylie: shang shang) (Sanskrit: civacivaka). This chimera is depicted either with just the head or including the whole torso of a human including the arms with the lower body as that of a winged bird. In Nyingma Mantrayana traditions of Mahayoga Buddhadharma, the shang-shang symbolises 'enlightened activity' (Wylie: phrin las). The shang-shang is a celestial musician, and is often iconographically depicted with cymbals. A homonymic play on words is evident which is a marker of oral lore: the 'shang' (Tibetan: གཆང, Wylie: gchang) is a cymbal or gong like ritual instrument in the indigenous traditions of the Himalaya. The shang-shang is sometimes depicted as the king of the Garuda.

== See also ==
- Kalaviṅka
- Kinnara kingdom
- Centaur, half-human half-horse creature from Greek mythology similar to a kinnara
- Satyr or Faun, half-human half-goat from Greek and Roman mythology that resembles the kinnaras in behaviour
- Harpy, a half-human half-bird mythological creature from the Greek mythology that resembles the kinnara
- Siren, another mythological creature also from the Greek mythology that resembles the kinnara and the Harpy
- Swan maiden and related tales of a mortal man who falls in love with a magical bird-woman, such as Prince Sudhana and Manohara
