= Yuen Ren Society =

The Yuen Ren Society or YRS (Chinese: 元任學會; pinyin: Yuánrèn Xuéhuì; full name: Yuen Ren Society for the Promotion of Chinese Dialect Fieldwork, Chinese: 元任漢語方言田野工作促進學會; pinyin: Yuánrèn Hànyǔ Fāngyán Tiányě Gōngzuò Cùjìn Xuéhuì) was a scholarly organization dedicated to discussion and publication of newly collected Chinese dialect field data. It was founded by David Prager Branner at the University of Washington in 1990. Branner published three volumes of data by diverse contributors and, with Richard VanNess Simmons, ran a series of public meetings until 2003.

The name "Yuen Ren" was intended as a tribute to Yuen Ren Chao [Zhào Yuánrèn] 趙元任 (1892–1982), claimed as the first true practitioner of comparative Chinese dialectology, as well as an indefatigable fieldworker. Branner also chose to interpret the name Yuánrèn 元任 to mean "primary responsibility, first duty," and asserted that the first duty of the dialectologist must be to gather descriptive linguistic data.

The Society's meetings were often held in conjunction with meetings of the American Oriental Society and were open to all interested parties. Frequent participants included Jerry Norman (1936–2012), W. South Coblin, and Axel Schuessler.
