= Edward Schafer =

Edward Schafer may refer to:

- Ed Schafer (born 1946), American politician
- Edward H. Schafer (1913–1991), American sinologist
- Edward Albert Sharpey-Schafer (1850–1935), formerly Edward Albert Schäfer, English physiologist
