= Yuen Ren Society Treasury of Chinese Dialect Data =

- Language: English, Chinese 漢語
- ISO 4: Find out here

== Founding ==
The Yuen Ren Society Treasury of Chinese Dialect Data (Chinese: 元任學會漢語⽅⾔資料寶庫; pinyin: Yuánrèn Xuéhuì Hànyǔ fāngyán zīliào bǎokù) is the journal of the Yuen Ren Society, an organization for the promotion of Chinese dialect fieldwork founded in 1990 by David Prager Branner.

== Notable contributions ==
There have been three volumes of the Treasury published to date, featuring scholarship by prominent linguists such as Jerry Norman, W. South Coblin, Âng Uî-jîn 洪惟仁, Lǐ Róng 李榮, Jerold Edmondson, and Richard VanNess Simmons, among others.

The Treasury has specialized in publishing records of highly distinctive Mǐn dialects spoken in rural regions of Fújiàn Province or in little-known villages of Taiwan. These records, of linguistic fieldwork conducted with informants as long ago as the 1970s, document unique living forms of Chinese not otherwise recorded and in many cases now no longer possible to record. In the particular case of Mǐn dialects, records of this kind are the sole descriptive linguistic basis for the study of spoken Chinese pre-dating the Middle Chinese era, since Mǐn dialects retain linguistic features from an era much older than common ancestor of the other dialect groups.

Mǐn dialect sites covered include:

- Village of Bǎishā Xià 百沙下村 Hépíng Township 和平鎮, Shàowǔ Municipality 邵武市, Fújiàn
- Village of Zhōngbǎo 中堡村, Gūtián Township 姑田鎮, Liánchéng County 連城縣, Fújiàn
- Village of Zhūyú 朱餘村, Géchuān Township 隔川鎮, Liánchéng County 連城縣, Fújiàn
- Gàidé Township 蓋德鎮, Déhuà County 德化縣, Quánzhōu Municipality 泉州市, Fújiàn
- Zhènqián Township 鎮前鎮, Zhènghé County 政和縣, Nánpíng Municipality 南平市, Fújiàn
- Village of Liándūn 連墩村, former Péngdūn Township 彭墩鎮, Jiànyáng District 建陽區, Nánpíng Municipality 南平市, Fújiàn
- Wánggōng District 王功區, Fāngyuàn Township 芳苑鄉, Changhua County 彰化縣, Taiwan
- Xīhú Township 溪湖鎮, Changhua County 彰化縣, Taiwan
- Běigǎng Township 北港鎮, Yunlin County 雲林縣, Taiwan
- Guānmiào District 關廟區, Tainan City 臺南市, Taiwan

The Treasury also published records of little-known dialects in other regions of the Chinese-speaking world, in Guǎngxī 廣西, Zhèjiāng 浙江, and elsewhere, along with newly collected data from better-established dialects, such as Fúzhōu 福州, Xīníng 西寧, Hong Kong, Héngyáng 衡陽, Nántōng 南通, Běijīng, and others, as well as Míng-Qīng guānhuà 明清官話. The Treasury is unusual in concentrating on dialect data, as the great majority of linguistic journals tend to emphasize analysis and discussion, relegating data to a lesser place.

== Bibliography ==
- Branner, David Prager 茶米 (1995), "The Yuen Ren Society 元任學會", The Yuen Ren Society Treasury of Chinese Dialect Data, I: 1–2
- Lǐ Róng 李榮 (1995), "Hànyǔ fāngyán zīliào bǎokù xù 漢語⽅⾔資料寶庫序", Fāngyán ⽅⾔, 1995 (4): 241. Appeared as "Lǐ Róng xù 李榮序" in The Yuen Ren Society Treasury of Chinese Dialect Data 元任學會漢語方言資料寶庫 (II: 5–6), with English translation by David Prager Branner. Chinese text also reprinted in Lǐ Róng 李榮, Fāngyán cúngǎo 方言存稿 (Běijīng 北京: Shāngwù Yìnshū Guǎn 商務印書館, 2012), p. 35.
