= Robam Kenorei =

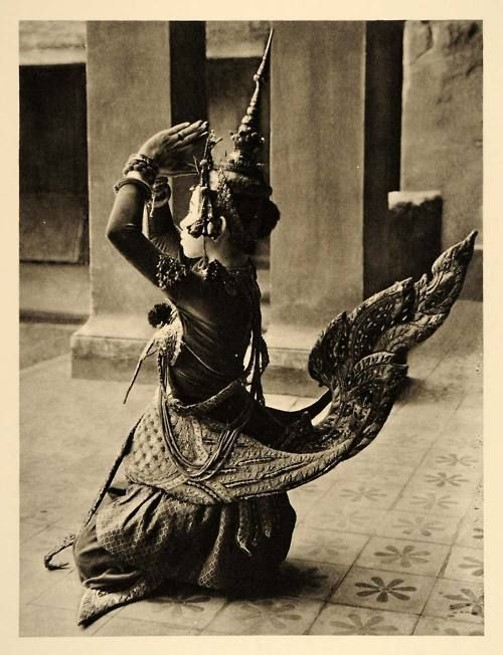
Cambodian kenorei dancer in 1920s at Phnom Penh National Museum.

Robam Kenorei (Khmer: របាំកិន្នរី) or Robam Kenor is one of Cambodian traditional dance depicting a group of benevolent half-human, half-bird creatures dancing in a lotus pond that frequently performed in the Royal Ballet of Cambodia.

== Etymology ==
The word robam in the Khmer language is referred to traditional dance. One of the earliest records of dance (Khmer: robam/ rabam) in Cambodia is from the 7th century, where performances were used as a funeral rite for kings. During the Angkor period, dance was ritually performed at temples.

Kenorei is derived from Sanskrit Kinnari for female half-human, half-bird creatures believed to have lived in the Himalayas. While kenor or kenora is derived from kinnara for male or the species of this creatures.

== History ==
The oldest depiction of kinnara in Cambodia is seen at 7th century temples of Sambor Prey Kuk, now a UNESCO World Heritage Site.

In Angkorian period, kinnara and kinnari frequently depicted on Angkorian temples with different appearance. At Angkor Wat, there are also several depictions of these male and female half-human and half-bird creature dancing.

Kenors are also commonly seen carved into support figurines for the columns of post-Angkorian architecture.

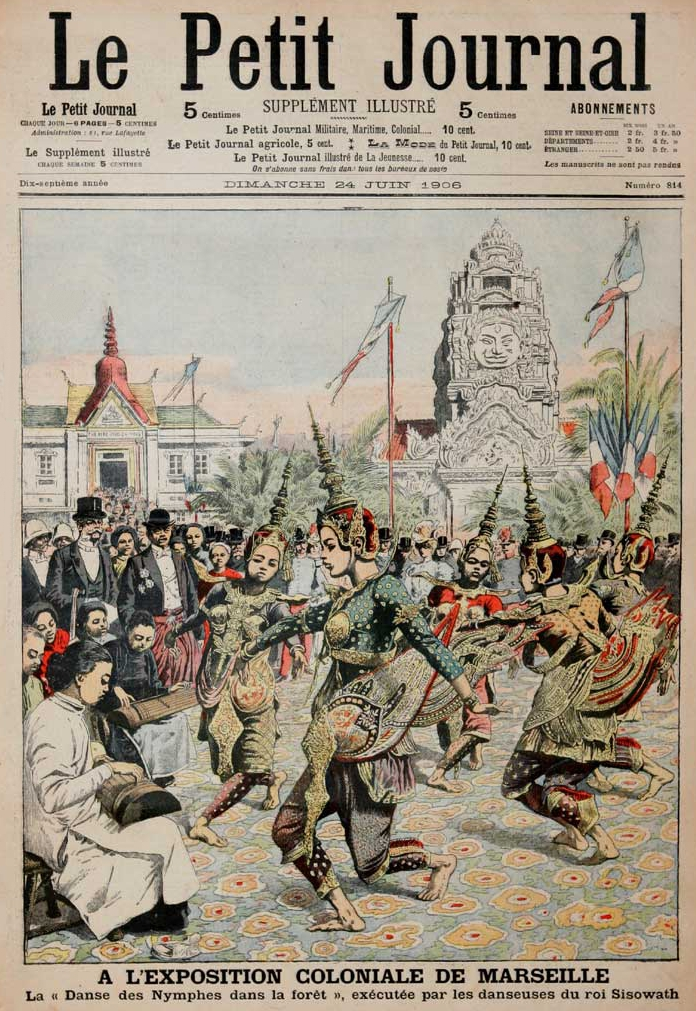
The kinnari dancers of King Sisowath at the 1906 Colonial Exposition in Marseilles.

In 1906, Kenorei dancers performed in Europe for the first time at the Colonial Exposition in Marseilles during the reign of King Sisowat. During the Khmer Rouge (1975-1979) atrocity in Cambodia, the dance almost vanished and reappeared again in 2000s under the leadership of Prince Norodom Bupphadevi, the first master Royal Ballet of Cambodia.

== Characters and costumes ==
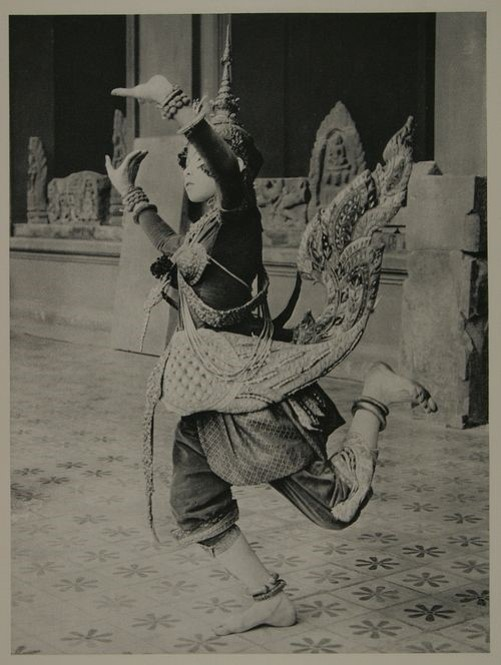
Cambodian kenorei dancer performed at Phnom Penh National Museum in 1920s.

The main and sole characters play in Robam Kenorei are the group of these female half-human, half-bird creatures known as Kenorei.

Kenorei characters wears distinct costumes compares to that of other characters in the Royal Ballet of Cambodia. The costumes of this character illustrates a bird creatures consisting of tail and wings-like decoration.

Kenorei's costumes are colorful and vary to which dance dramas they are accompanied. Kenorei wears mokot ksatrei, a single-spire crown with a transl. sa – transl. kbang (a front crown). The ears are adorned with flora (flower and lbak pkar on both side), the earrings, and chor trajeak (ears decorating jewelry). Kenorei does not wear sbai (a shawl-like garment worn in Cambodia) and only wears a soft long-sleeved silk shirt. An embroidered collar known as srang kor is worn around the neck and over the shirt. Connecting from the srang kor are a sort of epaulette that arches upwards on the shoulder but distinct from inthanu worn by most male characters. Kenorei character wears gold bras on the chest unlike any role in the Royal Ballet of Cambodia. A distinct decorated X-like strap around the body is worn over the body with an embroidered ornament in the middle.

Kenorei characters do not wear sampot sarabap nor sampot chang kben like other characters, instead they wear a knee-length pants, displaying a distinctively wide and embroidered hem around the knees, representing the foot of a bird. A pair of colorfully embroidered bird's wings-like clothes are worn from the front waist back wards. Below these wing-shaped cloth pieces is a bird's tail-like colorfully embroidered piece worn like a bird at the back. Below these wing and tail-like cloth pieces is another piece of silk covering the back side of the pants. In the middle of the wing-like pieces is a belt buckle connecting with a robang muk, decorated distinctively for bird character placing downward.

Similar to other characters, the jewelry for this Kenorei includes various types of ankle and wrists bracelets and bangles with many styles.

== Performance ==
Robam Kenorei are performed as a group of female half-human, half-bird creatures dancing in a lotus pond.

In other dance drama of the Royal Ballet of Cambodia, Kenorei dance is included in those dance dramas as an additional dance. For instance, kenorei dance are accompanied in a dance drama of Neang Waddhana Devi in a scene where Princess Waddhana Devi lost her consciousness and Kenoreis woke her up. In another dance drama known as ''Preah Anoruth-Neang Usa,'' Kenoreis play significant role in this dance drama where Anoruth (Aniruddha) and his companions fell in love with a group of five Kenoreis and lured them.

== Cultural Symbol ==
Kenorei are considered symbols of beauty and skilled dancers. Cambodian authors frequently compare a beautiful lady to Kenorei. The Kenorei is a character archetype in the repertoire of the Royal Ballet of Cambodia, appearing as mischievous groups that have a strong allurement.
