= Peter A. Boodberg =

American sinologist (1903–1972)

- Пётр Алексеевич Будберг
- Peter Boodberg (c. 1938)
- Born: 8 April 1903; Vladivostok, Russia
- Died: 29 June 1972 (aged 69); Berkeley, California, U.S.
- Education: University of California, Berkeley
- Scientific career
- Fields: Chinese language, history; Altaic languages
- Workplaces: University of California, Berkeley
- Notable students: William Boltz, Richard Mather, Edward Schafer, Fr. Paul Serruys, Roy Andrew Miller

Chinese name
- Chinese: 卜弼德
Transcriptions
Standard Mandarin
- Hanyu Pinyin: Bǔ Bìdé
- Gwoyeu Romatzyh: Buu Bihder
- Wade–Giles: Pu^{3} Pi^{4}-te^{2}

Peter Alexis Boodberg (born Pyotr Alekseyevich von Budberg; 8 April 1903 – 29 June 1972) was a Russian-American scholar, linguist, and sinologist who taught at the University of California, Berkeley, for 40 years. Boodberg was influential in 20th century developments in the studies of the development of Chinese characters, Chinese philology, and Chinese historical phonology. He has been described as "one of the most original and commanding scholars" of the 20th century.

== Life and career ==
Peter Alexis Boodberg was born Pyotr Alekseyevich von Budberg (Russian: Пётр Алексеевич Будберг) on 8 April 1903 in Vladivostok, Russia. The Budberg-Bönninghausen was a Baltic German noble family, originally from the district of Budberg in Werl, that had lived in Estonia since the 13th century. After Russia annexed Estonia in 1721, they became a prominent diplomatic and military family in Imperial Russia. Boodberg's father, Aleksei Pavlovich Budberg (1869–1945), was a baron and the commanding general of the Russian forces in Vladivostok. His father's position ensured that Boodberg enjoyed a strong education in the Latin and Greek Classics and in the major European languages. Budberg was a cadet at a military academy in St. Petersburg until the outbreak of World War I, when Budberg's parents sent him and his brother to Harbin, Manchuria, out of concern for their safety. Budberg attended the Oriental Institute (now Far Eastern Federal University) in Vladivostok, where he studied Chinese, which he had begun learning as a teenager in Harbin, and learned several other Asiatic languages.

The Budberg family fled Russia in 1920 due to the anti-aristocracy violence of the Bolshevik Revolution. The family emigrated to the United States, changing their surname to Boodberg, and settled in San Francisco. Boodberg enrolled as a student at the University of California, Berkeley, graduating with a B.A. in Oriental Languages in 1924. Boodberg continued studying at Berkeley as a graduate student, earning a Ph.D. in Oriental Languages in 1930 with a dissertation entitled "The Art of War in Ancient China: A Study Based on the Dialogues of Li, Duke of Wei."

In 1932, Boodberg was hired to teach at Berkeley as an instructor in the Oriental Languages department. He was made an associate professor in 1937, Chairman of the department in 1940, and was promoted to full professor in 1948. Boodberg's scholarship won him Guggenheim Fellowships in 1938, 1956, and 1963. In 1963, Boodberg also became President of the American Oriental Society. He continued to teach until his death from a heart attack in 1972. Boodberg influenced several generations of sinologists, notably Edward H. Schafer, who wrote a long obituary article in the Journal of the American Oriental Society that was followed by a full bibliography by Alvin P. Cohen.

Boodberg's only child, Xenia Boodberg Lee (1927–2004), was a concert pianist based in the San Francisco Bay area.

== Selected works ==
Boodberg authored a large number of studies and manuscripts that he did not formally publish, instead simply circulating them primarily among his students and close colleagues. Additionally, he destroyed several manuscripts related to philology and Chinese frontier history in the years prior to his death. The following are some of his better known published works.

- Boodberg, Peter A. (1930). "The Art of War in Ancient China: A Study Based Upon the Dialogues of Li, Duke of Wei". Ph.D. dissertation (University of California, Berkeley).
- ——— (1936). "The Language of the T'o-ba Wei". Harvard Journal of Asiatic Studies. 1 (2): 167–85. doi:10.2307/2717850. JSTOR 2717850.
- ——— (1937). "Some Proleptical Remarks on the Evolution of Archaic Chinese". Harvard Journal of Asiatic Studies. 2 (3/4): 329–72. doi:10.2307/2717943. JSTOR 2717943.
- ——— (1938). "Marginalia to the Histories of the Northern Dynasties". Harvard Journal of Asiatic Studies. 3 (3/4): 223–53. doi:10.2307/2717838. JSTOR 2717838.
- ——— (1940). "'Ideography' or Iconolatry?". T'oung Pao. 35 (4): 266–88. doi:10.1163/156853239X00062.
- ——— (1943). Exercises in Chinese Parallelism. Berkeley: University of California Press.
- ———; Chen, Shih-Hsiang (1948). Twenty-five Chinese Quatrains, with Vocabulary Exercises. Berkeley: University of California Press.
- ——— (1951). Introduction to Classical Chinese. Berkeley: University of California Press.
- ——— (1957). "Philological Notes on Chapter One of the Lao-tzu". Harvard Journal of Asiatic Studies. 20 (3/4): 598–618. doi:10.2307/2718364. JSTOR 2718364.
- Cohen, Alvin P., ed. (1979). Selected Works of Peter A. Boodberg. Berkeley: University of California Press.

== See also ==
- List of Baltic German scientists
