= Jerry Norman (sinologist) =

American sinologist and linguist (1936–2012)

- Born: July 16, 1936; Watsonville, California, U.S.
- Died: July 7, 2012 (aged 75); Seattle, Washington, U.S.

Academic background
- Education: University of California, Berkeley (BA, MA, PhD)
- Thesis: The Kienyang Dialect of Fukien (1969)
- Academic advisor: Y. R. Chao

Academic work
- Discipline: Linguistics
- Institutions: Princeton University; University of Washington
- Notable students: W. South Coblin
- Main interests: Min Chinese; Manchu language

Chinese name
- Traditional Chinese: 羅杰瑞
- Simplified Chinese: 罗杰瑞
Transcriptions
Standard Mandarin
- Hanyu Pinyin: Luó Jiéruì
- Gwoyeu Romatzyh: Luo Jyeruey
- Wade–Giles: Luo Chieh-jui
Southern Min
- Hokkien POJ: Lô Kia̍t-suī
Eastern Min
- Fuzhou BUC: Lò̤ giĕk sôi

Manchu name
- Manchu script: ᡝᠯᠪᡳᡥᡝ

Jerry Lee Norman (July 16, 1936 – July 7, 2012) was an American sinologist and linguist known for his studies of varieties of Chinese, particularly Min varieties, and also of the Manchu language. Norman had a large impact on Chinese linguistics, and was largely responsible for establishing the importance of Min varieties in the reconstruction of Old Chinese.

== Life and career ==
Jerry Norman was born on July 16, 1936, in Watsonville, California. His family were migrant farmers who had fled the Dust Bowl conditions of Oklahoma in the mid-1930s. Norman entered the University of Chicago in the autumn of 1954 and majored in Russian, but was forced to withdraw after two years because of financial problems. He was briefly a Catholic novitiate, then joined the U.S. Army and began studying at the Defense Language Institute Foreign Language Center in Monterey, California, where he was first introduced to the Chinese language.

After completing his military service, Norman enrolled at the University of California, Berkeley, graduating with a B.A. in 1961. He then continued at Berkeley as a graduate student, studying Chinese under the prominent Chinese linguist Y. R. Chao as well as Manchu and Mongolian under the American scholar James Bosson (1933–2016). He earned an M.A. in 1965, and after working with Chinese linguist Leo Chen on a glossary of the Fuzhou dialect, in 1966 he joined the Chinese Linguistics Project at Princeton University as a staff linguist. While at Princeton, Norman traveled to Taiwan to perform in field research on Min dialects spoken there by immigrants from Fujian Province, and in 1969 he received a Ph.D. from Berkeley with a dissertation entitled "The Kienyang Dialect of Fukien".

Norman was promoted to assistant professor after completing his Ph.D. in 1969. While at Princeton, Norman met and married Stella Chen, and together they had four children. In 1972, Norman moved with his family to Seattle, Washington to join the faculty of the Department of Asian Languages and Literature at the University of Washington, where he remained until his retirement in 1998. Norman's scholarship focused on the Min dialects of Chinese, and was largely responsible for its recognition as an important tool for reconstructing the phonology of Old Chinese. He was a passionate student of Manchu history and literature, and was one of the last North American scholars to be fluent and literate in Manchu.

Norman was mentored in his early years by Nicholas Bodman. He took part in the first meetings of the International Conference on Sino-Tibetan Languages and Linguistics, and was a regular participant in meetings of the Yuen Ren Society.

He died of idiopathic pulmonary fibrosis in Seattle on July 7, 2012.

== Selected works ==
- Norman, Jerry (1969), "The Kienyang Dialect of Fukien" (Ph.D. dissertation, University of California, Berkeley).
- ––– 1973. "Tonal Development in Min"; Journal of Chinese Linguistics 1–2: 222–238.
- ––– 1974. "The Initials of Proto-Min"; Journal of Chinese Linguistics 2-1: 27–36.
- ––– 1974. "Structure of Sibe Morphology"; Central Asian Journal.
- ––– 1976. With Mei Tsu-lin. "The Austroasiatics in Ancient South China: Some Lexical Evidence"; Monumenta Serica 32: 274–301, JSTOR 40726203.
- ––– 1978. A Concise Manchu-English Lexicon. University of Washington Press. ISBN 978-0-295-95574-2.
- ––– 1979. "Chronological Strata in the Min Dialects"; Fangyan 方言 1979.4: 268–274.
- ––– 1980. "Yongan fanyan" 永安方言; Shumu Jikan 书目季刊 14–2: 113–165.
- ––– 1981. "The Proto-Min Finals"; 中央研究院国际汉学会议论文集 语言文字组: 35–73.
- ––– 1984. "Three Min Etymologies"; Cahiers de Linguistique Asie Orientale 13–2: 175–189. doi:10.3406/clao.1984.1155.
- ––– 1986. "Min-Bei fangyan de di san tao qing saiyin he qing casaiyin 闽北方言的第三套清塞音和清擦塞音"; Zhongguo Yuwen 中国语文 1986.1: 38–41.
- ––– 1988. Chinese. Cambridge University Press, 1988. ISBN 978-0-521-29653-3.
- ––– 1991. "The Mǐn Dialects in Historical Perspective"; Languages and Dialects of China, edited by William S-Y. Wang, pp. 325–360. Published by Journal of Chinese Linguistics. JSTOR 23827042
- ––– 1994. "Pharyngealization in Early Chinese"; Journal of the American Oriental Society 114.3: 397–408. JSTOR 605083 Chinese translation by Gù Qián 顧黔, Richard VanNess Simmons 史皓元, and Chén Tíngtíng 陳婷婷 as "Zǎoqí Hànyǔ de yānhuà yǔ èhuà láiyuán" 早期漢語的咽化與齶化來源; Jìngwài Hànyǔ yīnyùnxué lùnwén xuǎn 境外漢語音韻學論文選 [Selected Readings in Chinese Historical Phonology by Scholars Outside China], edited by Pān Wùyún 潘悟雲, pp. 211–231. Shanghai: Shanghai Educational Publishing House, 2010.
- ––– 1995a. "A Glossary of Herpyng Dialect"; Yuen Ren Society Treasury of Chinese Dialect Data I: 107–126.
- ––– 1995b. With W. South Coblin. "A New Approach to Chinese Historical Linguistics"; Journal of the American Oriental Society 115–4: 576–584.
- ––– 1996. "Tonal Development in the Jennchyan Dialect"; Yuen Ren Society Treasury of Chinese Dialect Data II: 7–41.
- ––– 2000. With Gilbert L. Mattos. translation of Chinese Writing by Qiu Xigui. Society for the Study of Early China and the Institute of East Asian Studies, University of California. ISBN 978-1-55729-071-7
- ––– 2002. "A Glossary of the Lianduentsuen Dialect"; Treasury of Chinese Dialect Data: Short Chinese Dialect Reports 1: 339–394.
- ––– 2006. "Min Animal Body Parts"; Bulletin of Chinese Linguistics 1–1: 133–143.
- ––– 2007. "汉语方言田野调查与音韵学"; Beijing Daxue Xuebao 北京大学学报 44.2: 91–94.
- ––– 2013. A Comprehensive Manchu-English Dictionary. Harvard University Asia Center. ISBN 978-0-674-07213-8
- ––– 2025. "Popular and Learnèd in Chinese Dialects". Journal of the Royal Asiatic Society, 35(2): 491-503. doi:10.1017/S1356186324000427; corrigendum published online 2026: 1-2. doi:10.1017/S1356186325101417
