= William G. Boltz =

Professor of Asian languages and literature

- Education: University of California, Berkeley (BA, MA, PhD)
- Scientific career
- Fields: Chinese writing, philology, textual criticism
- Institutions: University of Washington

Chinese name
- Chinese: 鲍则岳
Transcriptions
Standard Mandarin
- Hanyu Pinyin: Bāo Zéyùe

William G. Boltz is an American sinologist. He is a professor emeritus at the University of Washington and a scholar of manuscript study, philology, and textual criticism, known for his studies of the origin of the Chinese writing system.

== Education and career ==
William G. Boltz attended the University of California, Berkeley and obtained his B.A., M.A., and Ph.D. degrees in Oriental languages in 1965, 1969, and 1974, respectively. At Berkeley, he studied Chinese language and linguistics under Professor Yuen Ren Chao, Chinese philology under Professor Peter A. Boodberg, Chinese linguistics from Professor Kun Chang, and Romance philology and linguistics from Professor Yakov Malkiel. In 1981, He began working as a professor of Classical Chinese in the Department of Asian Languages and Literature at the University of Washington.

In 2022, The Seattle Times reported that the University of Washington had investigated Boltz for multiple accusations of sexual harassment of students spanning several decades. Boltz received coaching from the university after several such incidents, as well as suspended merit pay increase for two years. He was permitted to continue teaching at the university. He has been quoted in the Times describing his actions as "poor decisions and wrong choices." As of 2022, Boltz is no longer teaching at UW.

== Selected works ==
- Boltz, William G. (1994). The Origin and Early Development of the Chinese Writing System. New Haven, Conn.: American Oriental Society. ISBN 0-940-49018-8
