= Paul Serruys =

Belgian missionary and sinologist (1912–1999)

Paul L-M. Serruys
- Born: 19 November 1912; Heule, West Flanders, Belgium
- Died: 16 August 1999 (aged 86); Kessel-Lo, Leuven, Belgium
- Education: University of California, Berkeley; Catholic University of Leuven
- Scientific career
- Institutions: University of Washington; Georgetown University
- Doctoral advisor: Peter A. Boodberg
- Notable students: W. South Coblin

Chinese name
- Traditional Chinese: 司禮義
- Simplified Chinese: 司礼义
Transcriptions
Standard Mandarin
- Hanyu Pinyin: Sī Lǐyì
- Gwoyeu Romatzyh: Sy Liiyih
- Wade–Giles: Ssu Li-i

Paul Leo-Mary Serruys C.I.C.M. (19 November 1912 – 16 August 1999) was a Belgian missionary, sinologist, and academic best known for his studies on the grammar of Classical Chinese, oracle bone script, and on the varieties of Chinese. He was a member of the Congregatio Immaculati Cordis Mariae (CICM; Congregation of the Immaculate Heart of Mary) missionary order, and proselyted in China in the 1930s, then later became a professor of Chinese at the University of Washington.

== Life and career ==
=== Early life ===
Paul Leo-Mary Serruys was born on 19 November 1912 in Heule, a village in the West Flanders region of Belgium. Serruys was one of seven children, and his father was a successful brewer. His primary education was in local village schools, after which he began boarding at a Catholic high school in nearby Kortrijk. The school required students to become fluent in French and German, as well as in the Latin and Greek Classics, which stimulated Serruys' interest in linguistics and philology. During his time in secondary school, Serruys became a strong supporter of the Flemish Movement.

In 1930, after he completed secondary school, Serruys followed his older brother Henry in joining the novitiate of the Congregatio Immaculati Cordis Mariae (Congregation of the Immaculate Heart of Mary), a Roman Catholic missionary order focused on East Asia and Africa. Inspired by the examples of prominent Catholic missionaries in China such as Matteo Ricci and Theophiel Verbist, the founder of the C.I.C.M., Serruys and his brother began intensively studying Mandarin Chinese, Classical Chinese, and other Chinese dialects at the Catholic University of Leuven. After several years of study, Serruys was ordained a Catholic priest on 4 August 1936 and departed for China one year later in August 1937.

=== China ===
Serruys arrived in Tianjin in November 1937 after a difficult two-month sea voyage, then traveled by train to his assigned parish in Xicetian (西册田), a small village in Shanxi Province located between Datong city and Hunyuan County along the banks of the Sanggan River. At the time, the area was occupied by the Imperial Japanese Army, while the countryside was patrolled by Chinese guerrilla fighters and bandits, making travel often dangerous. Serruys focused his efforts on studying the local dialect, which was a variety of Jin Chinese. Serruys' focus on studying the local language was often criticized by other missionaries, who felt he cared more about linguistic research than ministering to his congregants and proselytizing. Much of his early scholarship focused on correcting errors in existing translations of prayers, missals, and catechisms.

In March 1943, Serruys and his fellow missionaries were placed under house arrest by the Japanese, first in the Weihsien Internment Camp, then at the chapter house of the Jesuits in Beijing. Serruys was released with the rest of the captives in late 1945 following Japan's unconditional surrender and the end of World War II, whereupon Serruys was sent to Zhangguantun (张官屯), a township several miles outside of Cangzhou in Hebei Province. Conditions were poor due to the continuation of the Chinese Civil War, and Serruys was forced to hide most of his religious materials to prevent their confiscation by the anti-religious Chinese Communist Party forces after the Kuomintang lost control of the region in 1946. Serruys moved back to Beijing in 1947, where he taught at a C.I.C.M. academy and studied at Fu Jen Catholic University.

=== Berkeley ===
In 1949, Serruys and other C.I.C.M. missionaries who had been in China for more than 10 years were evacuated home to Europe. The C.I.C.M assigned Serruys and his brother to pursue graduate study in Chinese, so Serruys went to the University of California, Berkeley while his brother went to Columbia University. He arrived at Berkeley, California in 1950, where he studied under the prominent Russian-American sinologist Peter A. Boodberg, Chinese linguist Y. R. Chao, American linguist Mary Haas, and German sociologist Wolfram Eberhard. The C.I.C.M. did not provide Serruys with financial support during his time at Berkeley, so he supported himself by working as a chaplain and saying Mass and hearing confession at local Catholic churches. He received his Ph.D. in 1956 with a dissertation entitled "Prolegomena to the Study of Chinese Dialects of Han Time According to Fang Yen", a study of the Fangyan, an ancient Chinese dialect dictionary compiled in the 1st century AD by Yang Xiong. After receiving his Ph.D., Serruys received a Guggenheim Fellowship allowing him to continue working on his studies of the Fangyan for two years, resulting in his 1959 book The Chinese Dialects of Han Time According to Fang Yen.

=== Teaching ===
In 1962, Serruys left Berkeley to take up a position as director of the Chinese program at Georgetown University's Institute for Languages and Linguistics. He taught there for three years until 1965, when he was offered a professorship in early Chinese language at the University of Washington by Li Fang-Kuei. Serruys accepted, and was a professor at Washington for 16 years. Serruys recalled his time at Washington as "the happiest of his life", teaching courses on Classical Chinese and the development of Chinese characters. Serruys' Classical Chinese courses were some of the first to "[approach] classical texts from the standpoint of a carefully defined grammatical framework, strictly and rigorously applied in analysis". He retired in 1981 due to a policy that required professors to retire at age 70, which was common at U.S. universities in the 20th century.

=== Research ===
Early in his time at Washington, Serruys focused his research on Chinese bronze inscriptions, but later became engrossed in the study of oracle bone script. His research culminated in his article "Studies in the Language of the Shang Oracle Inscriptions", published in T'oung Pao in 1974, which is considered "a cornerstone of [the] field" among Western scholars. One theory regarding the grammar of the Shang oracle inscription language he proposed in the article is named after him, i.e., "Rule of Serruys"（司礼义法则）in the field of oracle bone studies. However, according to Edward L. Shaughnessy, "Serruys rarely wrote anything, and published even less; when he did publish, it was very hard to follow the logic of his argument, which was essentially presented through the translation of numerous example sentences."

=== Retirement and later life ===
The C.I.C.M had no chapterhouse in the Pacific Northwest, so Serruys decided to move to Taiwan after his retirement from the University of Washington. He struggled to adjust to life in Taiwan and began having some health problems, and so returned to the U.S. in 1985. In 1994, the C.I.C.M convinced Serruys to move to their retirement facility in Kessel-Lo, a village outside of Leuven in Belgium. The order provided space for Serruys' large book collection, and he spent the last years of his life doing as much research and correspondence as his health allowed. In 1999 he suffered a serious seizure possibly caused by a stroke, which severely weakened his body and mind. Serruys died in Kessel-Lo on 16 August 1999, aged 86.

== Selected works ==
- Serruys, Paul (1959). The Chinese Dialects of Han Time According to Fang Yen. Berkeley, Los Angeles: University of California Press.
- – – – (1974). "Studies in the Language of the Shang Oracle Inscriptions", T'oung Pao 60, pp. 12–120.
- – – – (1984). "On the System of the Pu Shou 部首 in the Shuo-wen chieh-tzu 說文解字", Bulletin of the Institute of History and Philology, Vol. 55, pt. 4, pp. 651–754.
- – – – (1991). "Studies in the Language of the Shih-ching: I, the Final Particle Yi", Early China, Vol. 16, pp. 81–168.
