= Jianyang dialect =

Northern Min Chinese spoken of Fujian, China

Jianyang
- Gṳ̿ing-iô̤ng-dī / 建陽事
- Native to: Southern China
- Region: Jianyang, Fujian
- Language family: Sino-Tibetan: Sinitic; Chinese; Min; Inland Min; Northern Min; Jianyang
- Early forms: Proto-Sino-Tibetan: Old Chinese (Note: Min is believed to have split from Old Chinese, rather than Middle Chinese like other varieties of Chinese.); Proto-Min

Language codes
- ISO 639-3: –
- Glottolog: jian1241

Jianyang (Kienyang) (Northern Min: Gṳ̿ing-iô̤ng-dī / 建陽事) is a dialect of Northern Min Chinese spoken in Jianyang in the north of Fujian province.

== Phonology ==
Jianyang dialect has 18 initials, 34 rimes and 8 tones.

=== Initials ===
Stops		Nasals	Fricatives	Approx.
p	pʰ	m	β	
t	tʰ	n		l
ts	tsʰ		s	
k	kʰ	ŋ	x	
ʔ			h	ɦ

- Fricative and affricate sounds /ts, tsʰ, s, x/ are realized as more palatal as [tɕ, tɕʰ, ɕ, ç], when preceding front vowels.
- /β/ can be realized as an approximant [ʋ] within different segments.

=== Rimes ===
a	ia	ua	
ɔ	iɔ		
o		uo	
e	ie	ue	ye
ai			
ɔi		ui	
au			
au	iu		
	i		y
aŋ	iaŋ	uaŋ	
ɔŋ	iɔŋ	uɔŋ	
eiŋ	ieiŋ	ueiŋ	yeiŋ
aiŋ			
ɔiŋ			
oŋ	iŋ	uŋ	

=== Tones ===
No.	1	2	3	4	5	6	7	8
Tone name	dark level 陰平	light level A 陽平甲	light level B 陽平乙	rising 上聲	dark departing 陰去	light departing 陽去	dark entering 陰入	light entering 陽入
Tone contour	˥˧ (53)	˧˧˦ (334)	˦˩ (41)	˨˩ (21)	˧˧˨ (332)	˦˧ (43)	˨˩˦ (214)	˦ (4)

The entering tones in Jianyang dialect don't have any entering tone coda (入聲韻尾) such as /-ʔ/, /-p̚/, /-t̚/ and /-k̚/. It's quite different from many other Chinese dialects.
