= Edward H. Schafer =

American historian (1913–1991)

- Born: August 23, 1913; Seattle, Washington, United States
- Died: February 9, 1991 (aged 77); Alameda, California, United States
- Education: University of California, Berkeley (BA, PhD); University of Hawaii (MA)
- Scientific career
- Fields: Tang dynasty
- Workplaces: University of California, Berkeley
- Doctoral advisor: Peter A. Boodberg

Chinese name
- Traditional Chinese: 薛愛華
- Simplified Chinese: 薛爱华
Transcriptions
Standard Mandarin
- Hanyu Pinyin: Xuē Àihuá
- Gwoyeu Romatzyh: Shiue Ayhwa
- Wade–Giles: Hsüeh Ai-hua

Edward Hetzel Schafer (August 23, 1913 – February 9, 1991) was an American historian, sinologist, and writer noted for his expertise on the Tang dynasty, and was a professor of Chinese at University of California, Berkeley, for 35 years. Schafer's most notable works include The Golden Peaches of Samarkand and The Vermilion Bird, which both explore China's interactions with other cultures and regions during the Tang dynasty.

== Life and career ==
Edward H. Schafer was born on August 23, 1913, in Seattle, Washington. After completing secondary school, Schafer followed his family to Los Angeles, California, where they sought better economic prospects. The financial hardships brought about by the Great Depression prevented Schafer's family from sending him to university, and he spent seven years working at a wholesale grocery to save up the money required. Although he was unable to attend university during that time, Schafer spent as much time as he could reading and studying at the Los Angeles Public Library, even managing to teach himself the basics of ancient Egyptian.

Schafer was eventually able to enter UCLA as an undergraduate student and spent three years studying there before transferring to University of California, Berkeley, for his final year, graduating with a B.A. degree in anthropology. After graduating from Berkeley, Schafer won a grant to study Chinese and was admitted to the University of Hawaii as a graduate student, earning his M.A. in 1940 with a thesis entitled "Persian Merchants in China During the T'ang Dynasty". Schafer then entered Harvard University where he began work on his Ph.D., but his studies were interrupted in December 1941 by the Japanese attack on Pearl Harbor and the United States' subsequent entry into World War II. During the war Schafer worked as a linguist for the Office of Naval Intelligence and was able to master Japanese, which he had begun studying at Harvard.

After the war's conclusion in 1945, Schafer returned to Berkeley and completed his Ph.D. in 1947 with a dissertation entitled "The Reign of Liu Ch'ang, Last Emperor of Southern Han; A Critical Translation of the Text of Wu Tai shih, with Special Inquiries into Relevant Phases of Contemporary Chinese Civilization". Upon completing his doctorate degree, he was immediately hired by Berkeley's Department of Oriental Languages. In 1949, the University of California Board of Regents adopted a controversial anti-Communist loyalty oath that was required for all faculty, and Schafer was one of 18 individuals who were fired for refusing to sign the oath. Schafer was supported in his decision by the rest of the Oriental Studies faculty and steadfastly refused to capitulate; he, along with the 17 other fired faculty members, was later reinstated with full back pay. Schafer earned tenure in 1953, was promoted to full professor in 1958, and in 1969 was given the Agassiz Professorship of Oriental Languages and Literature. During the 1970s, Schafer worked on the University of California policy change that allowed women to be given full status as faculty, rather than contingent lecturer status. Schafer decided to retire in 1984, and shortly before his official retirement was honored with the position of Faculty Research Lecturer, the highest position a Berkeley faculty member may be given.

Schafer served as president of the American Oriental Society for the 1975–1976 academic year, and from 1955 to 1968 served as East Asia Editor of the Journal of the American Oriental Society. He is known for his belief in Sinology, which emphasizes philology, language skills and classical texts, an approach often contrasted with the Area Studies, which emphasizes recent history and social science theories. His publications include over 100 scholarly articles and more than a dozen books.

Schafer died in California in 1991, aged 77, following a short battle with liver cancer.

== Selected works ==
- Schafer, Edward H. (1947). "The Reign of Liu Ch'ang, Last Emperor of the Southern Han: A Critical Translation of the Text of Wu Tai shih, with Special Inquiries into Relevant Phases of Contemporary Chinese Civilization". Ph.D. dissertation, University of California, Berkeley.
- Schafer, Edward H. (1954). "Non-Translation and Functional Translation—Two Sinological Maladies". The Far Eastern Quarterly. 13 (3): 251–260. doi:10.2307/2942278.
- ––– (1961). Tu Wan's Stone Catalogue of Cloudy Forest: A Commentary and Synopsis. Berkeley, Los Angeles: University of California Press.
- ––– (1963). The Golden Peaches of Samarkand: A Study of T'ang Exotics. Berkeley, Los Angeles: University of California Press.
- ––– (1967). The Vermilion Bird: T'ang Images of the South. Berkeley, Los Angeles: University of California Press.
- ––– (1977). Pacing the Void: T'ang Approaches to the Stars. Berkeley, Los Angeles: University of California Press.
- ––– (1981). "Wu Yün's 'Cantos on Pacing the Void'". Harvard Journal of Asiatic Studies 41, pp. 377–415.

== References and further reading ==
- P. W. K. [Paul W. Kroll], and P. B. [Peter Boodberg], “Edward Hetzel Schafer August 25, 1913-February 9, 1991.” Journal of the American Oriental Society 111, no. 3 (1991): 441–43.
- Cahill, James, Elizabeth Colson, and Jeffrey Riegel (1991). "Edward Schafer". University of California: In Memoriam, 1991, pp. 183–85.
- "Edward H. Schafer; Professor Who Rejected Loyalty Oath". Los Angeles Times. 14 February 1991.
- Honey, David B. (1991). "Edward Hetsel Schafer (1913–1991)". Journal of Asian History, vol. 25, no. 2, pp. 181–93.
- Laurence G. Thompson, "Edward Hetzel Schafer (23 August 1913 - 9 February 1991)", Journal of Chinese Religions, 19:1, 129–130, DOI: 10.1179/073776991805307756
