= W. South Coblin =

American sinologist and linguist

- Born: February 26, 1944 (age 82)
- Education: University of Washington (BA, PhD)
- Scientific career
- Fields: Chinese linguistics, Tibetan linguistics
- Workplaces: University of Iowa
- Doctoral advisor: Fr. Paul Serruys
- Other academic advisors: Li Fang-Kuei; Jerry Norman

Chinese name
- Chinese: 柯蔚南
Transcriptions
Standard Mandarin
- Hanyu Pinyin: Kē Wèinán
- Gwoyeu Romatzyh: Ke Weynan
- Wade–Giles: K'o Wei-nan

Weldon South Coblin, Jr. (born February 26, 1944) is an American Sinologist, linguist, and educator, best known for his studies of Chinese linguistics and Tibetan.

== Early life, family and education ==
Coblin attended the University of Washington, graduating with a B.A. in Chinese in 1967. He remained at Washington as a graduate student, studying under the Belgian Sinologist and Roman Catholic clergyman Fr. Paul Serruys, earning a Ph.D. in Chinese language and literature in 1972. His dissertation was "An Introductory Study of Textual and Linguistic Problems in Erh-ya".

== Career ==
After completing his Ph.D., Coblin stayed at the University of Washington for a year as a teaching associate. In 1973, he joined the faculty of the University of Iowa, where he spent his entire career.

Early in his career he made many important contributions to Tibetan and Sino-Tibetan linguistics. Since the mid-1990s, his focus has primarily been on alphabetic representations of Chinese. Starting around that time along with Jerry Norman he promoted a new direction in Chinese historical phonology making less use of the Qieyun and other rhyme books, and more use of the traditional comparative method. Coblin is an emeritus professor at the University of Iowa.

== Selected works ==
- Coblin, W. South (1972). "An Introductory Study of Textual and Linguistic Problems in Erh-ya", Ph.D. dissertation (University of Washington).
- "Notes on Tibetan Verbal Morphology," T'oung Pao 52 (1976), pp. 45–70.
- ——— (1983). A Handbook of Eastern Han Sound Glosses. Hong Kong: Chinese University Press. ISBN 962-201-258-2.
- ——— (1986). A Sinologist's Handlist of Sino-Tibetan Lexical Comparisons. Monumenta Serica Monograph Series. Vol. 18. Nettetal: Steyler.
- ——— (1991). Studies in Old Northwest Chinese. Journal of Chinese Linguistics Monograph Series. Vol. 4. Berkeley: Project on Linguistic Analysis, University of California.
- ———; Norman, Jerry (1995). "A New Approach to Chinese Historical Linguistics". Journal of the American Oriental Society. 115 (4): 576–84. doi:10.2307/604728. JSTOR 604728.
- ——— (1997). "Notes on the Sound System of Late Ming Guanhua". Monumenta Serica. 45: 261–307. doi:10.1080/02549948.1997.11731303.
- ——— (2000). "A Brief History of Mandarin". Journal of the American Oriental Society. 120 (4): 537–52. doi:10.2307/606615. JSTOR 606615.
- ——— (2000). "A Diachronic Study of Míng Guānhuà Phonology". Monumenta Serica. 48: 267–335. doi:10.1080/02549948.2000.11731346. S2CID 192485681.
- ——— (2005). Comparative Phonology of the Huáng-Xiào Dialects. Taipei: Academia Sinica, Institute of Linguistics. ISBN 986-00-3149-5.
- ——— (2007). A Handbook of 'Phags-pa Chinese. Honolulu: University of Hawaii Press. ISBN 978-0-8248-3000-7.
